= List of members of the Virginia House of Burgesses =

This is a list of members of the Virginia House of Burgesses from 1619 to 1775 from the references listed at the end of the article. The members of the first assembly in 1619, the members of the last assembly in 1775 and the Speakers of the House are designated by footnotes. Surviving records do not include lists of members for some years, especially before 1676, and do not include all the members for some of the sessions. Some of these omissions may be covered by the names of persons who served in several sessions. This list does not include officials of the assembly, such as chaplains or clerks, who were not burgesses, or persons who were elected but denied a seat.

"(Burgess)" is used in many titles of linked articles or planned articles below to distinguish members of the Virginia House of Burgesses from other persons with the same name. Two burgesses of the same name are distinguished by showing the first year served in the assembly after the word "burgess" in the link. "Burgess" may need to be added to some titles of unwritten articles if articles of similar name are written first and need for disambiguation arises. Militia officer grades are shown only if they are identified as such or included with a military grade title (e.g. captain) on a list of burgesses in a source or in a thumbnail or other biography. These grades, or ranks, were generally, but not always, shown on original lists of members of sessions. The absence of such a grade before a name on the list should not be assumed to mean the burgess was not a militia officer at some time in his life.

== A ==
- Robert Abrahall (sometimes spelled Robert Abrell)
- John Ackiss
- William Acrill, Jr.
- William Acrill, Sr.
- Richard Adams
- Robert Adams (sometimes spelled Robert Addams)
- Thomas Adams
- William Aitchison
- Gerard Alexander
- John Alexander
- (Major) Arthur Allen II
- Edmund Allen
- Edward Allen
- John Allen
- William Allen
- William Allen
- Isaac Allerton Jr.
- Willoughby Allerton
- Thomas Allonby
- Edward Ambler
- John Ambler
- Charles Anderson
- George Anderson
- John Anderson
- Matthew Anderson
- Richard Anderson
- Robert Anderson
- William Anderson
- William Andrews
- William Andrews, Jr.
- John Appleton
- (Captain) Henry Applewhaite, Jr.
- Henry Applewhaite, Sr.
- Anthony Armistead
- Anthony Armistead, Jr.
- Gill Armistead
- (Colonel) Henry Armistead
- John Armistead
- Robert Armistead
- Robert Armistead
- William Armistead
- John Arundell
- Charles Ashton
- Henry Ashton
- Peter Ashton
- (Lt. Colonel) Walter Aston
- John Atkins
- Henry Aubrey
- William Aubrey
- William Aylett
- William Aylett
- William Aylett

== B ==
- John Bacon
- James Bagnall
- Roger Bagnall
- Henry Bagnell
- Henry Bagwell
- Thomas Bagwell
- Thomas Bailey
- William Bailey
- Benjamin Baker
- Henry Baker, Jr.
- Henry Baker, Sr.
- (Captain) Lawrence Baker
- Richard Baker
- Thomas Baker
- William Baker
- Robert Baldry
- Thomas Baldridge
- George Ball, Jr.
- George Ball, Sr.
- Henry Ball
- (Colonel) James Ball, Jr.
- (Major) James Ball, Sr.
- Spencer Ball, Jr. (sometimes shown as Spencer Mottrom Ball)
- (Colonel) Spencer Ball, Sr.
- (Colonel) William Ball, III
- (Captain) William Ball, Jr.
- William Ball, Sr.
- Francis Ballard
- Robert Ballard
- (Colonel) Thomas Ballard Jr.
- John Banister
- Charles Barber
- Thomas Barber
- William Barber, Jr.
- William Barber
- Thomas Barbour
- Anthony Barham
- William Barker
- Lancelot Barnes
- Thomas Barnett
- Edward Barradall
- Charles Barret
- William Barrett
- Robert Barrington
- (Captain) Nathaniel Basse
- Burwell Bassett, Sr.
- William Bassett
- William Bassett
- John Bates
- (Captain) John Battaile
- Henry Batte
- William Batte
- John Baugh
- (Captain) James Baughan
- Arthur Bayley
- Richard Bayley
- John Baylis
- John Baylor, Sr.
- John Baylor, Jr.
- Alexander Baynham
- Robert Beasley
- Henry Bell
- John Bell
- (Captain) James Benn
- Philip Bennett
- Richard Bennett
- Thomas Bennett
- William Bentley
- Edmund Berkeley
- (Captain) William Berkeley
- (Captain) Thomas Bernard (sometimes shown as Thomas Barnett)
- Peter Beverley
- Robert Beverley Jr.
- William Beverley (sometimes spelled William Beverly)
- William Bibb
- Richard Bigge
- John Bill
- Abraham Bird
- William Bird
- John Bishop
- James Bisse
- Richard Blackburn
- Thomas Blackburn
- William Blackey
- Joseph Blackwell
- Samuel Blackwell
- William Blacky
- Henry Blagrave
- Archibald Blair
- John Blair, Sr.
- John Blair, Jr.
- (Captain) John Blake
- Peregrine Bland
- Richard Bland
- Richard Bland
- Theodorick Bland of Cawsons
- Theodorick Bland of Westover
- Edward Blany (sometimes spelled "Edward Blaney")
- Thomas Blayton
- Richard Blunt
- Michael Blow
- Alexander Bolling
- John Bolling
- Robert Bolling
- Robert Bolling
- (Colonel) Robert Bolling
- (Major) John Bond
- Edmund Booker
- Edward Booker
- Edward Booker, Jr.
- Richard Booker
- Robert Booth
- Daniel Boucher
- (Captain) Robert Bourne
- Maximillian Boush
- Samuel Boush, Jr.
- Samuel Boush, Sr.
- John Bowdoin
- Peter Bowdoin
- John Bowyer
- John Boys (sometimes spelled John Boyse)
- Cheney Boyse
- Luke Boyse
- William Bradley
- Christopher Branch
- John Branch
- John Brasseur
- Carter Braxton
- George Braxton, Sr.
- George Braxton, Jr.
- James Bray
- James Bray Jr.
- Robert Bray
- Thomas Breman
- George Brent
- John Brewer
- Richard Brewster
- James Bridger
- (Colonel) Joseph Bridger
- Samuel Bridger
- (Colonel) William Bridger
- Gray Briggs
- Charles Broadwater
- Walter Brodhurst
- Edward Brodnax
- William Brodnax Jr.
- William Brodnax Sr.
- George Brooke
- Devereaux Browne
- Henry Browne
- John Browne
- William Browne
- John Browning
- John Buckner
- Richard Buckner
- Samuel Buckner
- Thomas Buckner
- William Buckner
- Charles Burgess
- Thomas Burgess (sometimes spelled Thomas Burges)
- John Burnham
- Rowland Burnham
- Zacariah Burnley
- Benoni Burrows
- Christopher Burrows
- John Burton
- Armistead Burwell
- Carter Burwell
- James Burwell
- Lewis Burwell
- Lewis Burwell
- Nathaniel Burwell
- Robert Carter Burwell
- John Bushrod
- Thomas Bushrod
- William Butler
- Thomas Butt
- William Byrd I
- (Colonel) William Byrd II
- William Byrd III

== C ==
- Joseph Cabell
- William Cabell, Jr.
- James Callaway
- Richard Callaway
- William Callaway
- (Colonel) Christopher Calthorpe
- Andrew Campbell
- (Major) David Cant
- John Cant
- William Capps (sometimes spelled William Capp)
- John Cargill
- Dabney Carr
- Thomas Carr
- George Carrington
- Paul Carrington
- (Colonel) Charles Carter
- Charles Carter
- Charles Hill Carter
- Edward Carter
- Edward Carter
- John Carter, Sr.
- John Carter, Jr.
- Landon Carter
- Robert Carter I (Robert "King" Carter)
- Robert W. Carter
- (Captain) William Carver
- Archibald Cary
- Miles Cary (burgess)
- Miles Cary (immigrant)
- William Cary
- Wilson Miles Cary (sometimes shown as Willson Miles Cary)
- George Catchmaie or Cathmaid
- John Catlett, Jr.
- Benjamin Cave
- Robert Caulfield
- William Cawfield
- Nathaniel Causey (sometimes spelled Nathaniel Cawsey)
- Thomas Causey
- Thomas Ceely
- John Champe
- William Champe
- Thomas Chamberlayn
- William Chamberlayne
- John Chandler
- Isaac Chaplin
- Stephen Charleton
- Stephen Charleton
- John Cheesman (sometimes spelled John Chisman)
- John Chew
- Larkin Chew
- John Chiles
- (Lt. Colonel) Walter Chiles
- Walter Chiles, Jr. (sometimes shown as Walter Chiles, II)
- Joseph Chinn
- Thomas Chisman
- John Chiswell
- Israel Christian
- William Christian
- Richard Church
- William Churchill
- John Clack
- Sterling Clack
- (Colonel) Augustine Claiborne
- Leonard Claiborne
- Leonard Claiborne, Jr.
- Philip Whitehead Claiborne
- Richard Claiborne
- Thomas Claiborne
- William Claiborne
- Josias Clapham
- Phettiplace Clause
- John Clayton
- Thomas Clayton
- (Colonel) William Clayton
- Francis Clements
- William Clinch
- Samuel Cobbs
- (Colonel) Allen Cocke
- Benjamin Cocke
- Bowler Cocke, Jr.
- Bowler Cocke, Sr.
- Hartwell Cocke
- James Cocke
- Richard Cocke
- Richard Cocke
- Thomas Cocke
- (Captain) William Cockerham
- (Colonel) St. Leger Codd
- William Cole (immigrant)
- William Cole (burgess)
- Francis Coleman
- Isaac Coles
- John Coles
- George Collclough
- William Colston
- John Colville
- Henry Coney
- Edwin Conway
- (Major) Peter Conway
- Giles Cooke
- Mordecai Cooke, Jr.
- George Cooper
- Gawin Corbin
- Gawin Corbin, Jr.
- Gawin Corbin Sr.
- Henry Corbin
- Richard Corbin
- John Tayloe Corbin
- John Corker
- William Corker
- Joshua Corprew
- Richard Covington
- Thomas Cowles
- Richard Coxe
- Thomas Crampe (may be same as later listed) (Sergeant) Thomas Crump
- (Colonel) David Crawford
- William Crawford (Craford, Crafford)
- Randall Crew
- Zachary Cripps
- Joseph Croshaw
- Raleigh Croshaw (sometimes spelled Rawley or Raleigh Crashaw)
- Mr. Cunningham
- Nicholas Curle
- John Curtis
- Rice Curtis
- Hancock Custis
- John Custis II
- John Custis III
- John Custis IV
- William Custis

== D ==
- William Dacker
- Francis Dade
- William Daingerfield
- William Daingerfield, Jr.
- Thomas Dalby
- Edward Dale
- Bartholomew Dandridge
- (Colonel) John Dandridge
- Nathaniel West Dandridge
- James Dashiell
- Thomas Davis
- (Major) Thomas Davis
- William Davis
- John Day
- Richard Death
- Henry Delony
- (Captain) Clement Delk (also known as Clement Dilke)
- Roger Delk (also known as Roger Dilke)
- William Denson
- Thomas Dew
- Stephen Dewey
- Cole Digges
- Dudley Digges
- Dudley Digges Jr.
- Dudley Digges (patriot)
- Edward Digges
- William Digges
- Thomas Dipnall (sometimes spelled Thomas Dipdall)
- Roger Dixon
- Robert Doak
- Thomas Doe
- John Donelson
- Edward Douglas
- George Douglas
- John Downing
- John Downman
- George Downes
- Henry Downs
- John Downman
- Thomas Dowse
- Dolphin Drew
- Richard Drummond
- William Drummond
- Ambrose Dudley
- Richard Dudley
- Henry Duke
- John Dunston
- Samuel Duval

== E ==
- Samuel Earle
- John Eaton
- Matthew Edlowe (sometimes spelled Edlow or Edloe)
- Matthew Edlowe, Jr. (sometimes spelled Edlow, Jr. or Edloe, Jr.)
- James Edmondson
- John Edmunds
- Thomas Edmunds
- James Edmundson
- Thomas Edmundson (sometimes spelled Edmondson)
- Nathaniel Edwards
- William Edwards, 1652
- William Edwards, 1703
- Joseph Eggleston
- Jacob Elligood
- Anthony Elliott (sometimes spelled Anthony Ellyott)
- (Captain) Robert Ellyson
- Henry Embry
- William Embry
- William Emerson
- John English
- William English
- (Captain) Francis Eppes
- (Colonel) Francis Eppes
- (Colonel) Francis Eppes
- Francis Eppes
- Isham Eppes
- John Eppes
- Littlebury Eppes
- Richard Eppes
- (Colonel) George Eskridge
- Samuel Ewell
- Solomon Ewell
- Littleton Eyre
- Robert Eyre (sometimes spelled Eyres)
- Severn Eyre

== F ==
- Thomas Fallowes
- George William Fairfax
- William Fairfax
- Thomas Farley
- Lodowick Farmer
- Thomas Farmer
- (Lieutenant Colonel) John Farrar
- (Colonel) William Farrar Jr.
- (Major) William Farrar III
- Nicholas Faulcon, Jr.
- Thomas Fawcett
- George Fawdon (sometimes spelled Fawdoin or Faudoun or Fawdown)
- (Colonel) Moore Fauntleroy
- William Fauntleroy
- Thomas Fawcett (sometimes spelled Fossett)
- John Feild
- Peter Feild
- (Captain) Robert Felgate (sometimes spelled Fellgate)
- Henry Field, Jr. (sometimes spelled Feild, Jr.)
- Henry Filmer
- George Fitzhugh
- Henry Fitzhugh
- Henry Fitzhugh
- (Major) John Fitzhugh
- William Fitzhugh
- William Fitzhugh
- William Fitzhugh
- (Colonel) William Fitzhugh
- William Fitzhugh
- John Fleming
- John Fleming, Jr.
- Robert Fleming
- Henry Fleet
- George Fletcher
- Richard Flint
- (Lieutenant) Thomas Flint
- John Flood
- Charles Floyd
- Thomas Follis
- Richard Ford
- (Captain) Richard Fossaker
- Thomas Fossett
- Joseph Foster
- (Captain) Richard Foster
- Gerrard Fowke (brother of Thomas Foulke below)
- Thomas Fowke (sometimes spelled Foulke)
- Francis Fowler
- David Fox
- Henry Fox
- Henry Fox, Jr.
- William Fox
- Thomas Francis
- Ferdinand Franklin
- Bridges Freeman
- Henry Fry
- John Fry
- Joshua Fry
- Francis Fulford

== G ==
- Harry Gaines
- John Gaddes (sometimes spelled Gadis)
- Thomas Gale
- James Garnett
- Thomas Gaskins
- Thomas Glasscock
- (Colonel) John George
- (Lieutenant) John Gibbs
- Jonathan Gibson
- John Giles (sometimes spelled Gyles)
- (Captain) Stephen Gill
- Matthew Godfrey
- Joseph Godwin
- (Colonel) Thomas Godwin
- Thomas Godwin, Jr.
- William Gooch
- Charles Goodrich
- Edward Goodrich
- Edward Goodrich, Jr.
- John Goodrich
- James Goodwin
- Daniel Gookin
- John Gookin
- Matthew Gough
- Nathaniel Gough
- William Gough
- Francis Gouldman (burgess)
- Thomas Gouldman
- Edward Gourgainy
- Abell Gower
- Captain Thomas Graves
- (Colonel) Edwin Gray
- Francis Gray
- (Colonel) Joseph Gray
- William Gray
- William Gray, Jr.
- John Green
- William Green
- David Greenhill
- Paschall Greenhill
- Richard Gregory
- Thomas Gregson
- Edward Grendon (sometimes spelled Grindon or Grindall)
- Thomas Grendon
- Thomas Grendon, Jr.
- Thomas Griffin
- Edward Griffth
- Benjamin Grymes
- Charles Grymes
- John Grymes
- Philip Ludwell Grymes
- George Gwillen
- David Gwyn
- Hugh Gwyn
- Hugh Gwynn

== H ==
- Peter Hack
- (Captain) Thomas Hackett
- Samuel Hairston
- Robert Hall
- Jeremy Ham (sometimes shown as Jerom Ham)
- Edward Hamerton
- James Hamilton
- John Hamlin
- Stephen Hamlin
- John Hammond
- Francis Hardiman
- John Hardiman
- William Hardwick, alternately show as Hardinge, Hardidge and Hardage
- George Hardy
- Richard Hardy
- John Harlowe
- Ambrose Harmer
- George Harmanson
- John Harmanson
- Matthew Harmanson
- Thomas Harmanson
- Thomas Harmanson, Jr.
- Charles Harmer
- John Harmer
- John Harris
- John Harris
- Richard Harris
- Robert Harris
- (Captain) Thomas Harris
- William Harris
- William Samuel Harris
- Benjamin Harrison, Jr.
- Benjamin Harrison III
- Benjamin Harrison IV
- Benjamin Harrison V
- (Lieutenant) George Harrison
- Henry Harrison
- Nathaniel Harrison
- Thomas Harrison, Jr.
- William Harrison
- Henry Hartwell
- William Hartwell
- Humphrey Harwood
- Joseph Harwood
- Samuel Harwood
- Samuel Harwood, Jr.
- Thomas Harwood
- William Harwood (councillor)
- William Harwood
- William Harwood, Jr.
- William Hatcher
- John Hawkins
- (Captain) Thomas Hawkins
- (Major) Thomas Hawkins. Jr.
- William Hay
- Thomas Haynes
- (Captain) John Haynie (sometimes spelled Haney)
- Richard Haynie
- Samuel Hayward
- George Heale
- George Heale
- Peter Hedgman
- James Henry
- Patrick Henry
- Henry Herrick (sometimes spelled Hayrick or Heyrick)
- Thomas Herrick (sometimes spelled Hayrick)
- John Hayward
- Edward Hill
- Edward Hill, Jr.
- Edward Hill III
- John Hill
- Thomas Hill
- Abraham Hite
- John Hite
- Thomas Hite
- Francis Hobbs
- Thomas Hobson
- William Hockaday
- Nathaniel Hoggard (sometimes spelled Hoggart)
- John Hoddin (sometimes spelled Hodin)
- Thomas Hodges
- Anthony Holiday
- Anthony Holladay
- Gabriel Holland
- Simon Hollier
- John Holloway
- John Hollows
- John Holman
- James Holt
- Robert Holt
- Thomas Holt
- Rice Hooe
- Daniel Hornby
- Stephen Horsey
- Warham Horsmanden
- Anthony Hoskins
- Batholomew Hoskins
- Francis Hough
- Allen Howard
- Benjamin Howard
- John Howe
- Robert Hubbard
- Peter Hull
- Richard Hull
- William Hunter
- John Hutchings
- John Hutchings, Jr.
- Joseph Hutchings
- (Captain) Robert Hutchinson
- William Hutchison (sometimes spelled Hutchinson)

== I ==
- Hugh Innes
- Abraham Iverson

== J ==
- John Jackson
- Joseph Jackson
- Edward Jaquelin
- Thomas Jarvis
- Thomas Jarrell
- Thomas Jarvis
- John Jefferson
- Peter Jefferson
- Thomas Jefferson
- Daniel Jenifer
- Peter Jenings
- Henry Jenkins
- Jacob Johnson
- Joseph Johnson
- Philip Johnson
- Richard Johnson
- Thomas Johnson
- Thomas Johnson
- Thomas Johnson
- William Johnson
- William Johnson
- George Johnston
- Peter Johnston
- William Johnston
- Anthony Jones
- Gabriel Jones
- John Jones
- John Jones
- Joseph Jones
- Orlando Jones
- Richard Jones
- Robert Jones
- Robert Jones
- Robert Jones
- Thomas Jones
- William Jones
- William Jones
- (Colonel) George Jordan
- John Jordan
- Richard Jordan
- Samuel Jordan
- Samuel Jordan
- Thomas Jordan
- Ralph Justice

== K ==
- Barnaby Kearne
- William Keeling
- John Keeton
- James Keith
- Matthew Kemp
- Matthew Kemp
- William Kempe
- William Kendall
- William Kendall Jr.
- Richard Kenner
- Rodham Kenner
- Rodham Kenner
- Richard Kennon
- Richard Kennon
- William Kennon
- Thomas Key
- Henry King
- Joseph King
- Richard Kingsmill (sometimes spelled Kingsmell)
- Thomas Kingston
- (Captain) Peter Knight
- John Knowles

== L ==
- Mr. Land
- Thomas Lambert
- (Captain) John Lane
- John Langhorne
- William Langhorne
- Ralph Langley
- William Langley
- Benjamin Lankford
- (Captain) Christopher Lawne
- Richard Lawrence
- Anthony Lawson
- John Lear
- Francis Lightfoot Lee
- George Lee
- Hancock Lee
- Henry Lee II
- John Lee
- John Constable Lee
- Philip Ludwell Lee
- Richard Lee I
- Richard Lee II
- Richard Henry Lee
- Richard "Squire" Lee
- Thomas Lee
- Thomas Ludwell Lee
- William Lee
- Peter Legrand
- William Leigh
- Andrew Lewis
- Charles Lewis
- John Lewis
- Robert Lewis
- William Lewis
- Zachary Lewis
- William Lightfoot
- Thomas Lygon
- William Lister
- James Littlepage
- Nathaniel Littleton
- Southey Littleton
- Daniel Llewellyn
- Cornelius Lloyd
- Edward Lloyd
- Thomas Lloyd
- William Lloyd
- George Lobb
- Lunsford Lomax
- Thomas Loving
- Thomas Lucas
- William Luddington
- Philip Ludwell Jr.
- Philip Ludwell, Sr.
- Philip Ludwell III
- (Captain) John Lyddall
- Cornelius Lyde
- Charles Lynch
- Charles Lynch
- George Lyne
- William Lyne

== M ==
- Daniel McCarty
- Daniel McCarty, Jr.
- Samuel McDowell
- Frederick Macklin (sometimes spelled Maclin)
- Gideon Macon
- William Macon
- William Macon
- John Madison
- Edward Major
- David Mansfield (sometimes spelled Mansell)
- George Marrable (sometimes spelled Marable)
- Matthew Marrable (sometimes spelled Marable)
- William Marrable (sometimes spelled Marable)
- James Marshall
- Roger Marshall
- Thomas Marshall
- Thomas Marshall
- (Captain) William Marshall
- Nicholas Martiau (sometimes spelled Martian)
- Thomas Bryan Martin
- Peter Marye
- David Mason
- Francis Mason
- George Mason (Norfolk)
- George Mason I
- George Mason II
- George Mason III
- George Mason IV
- James Mason
- John Mason
- (Colonel) John Mason
- (Colonel) Lemuel Mason
- Thomas Mason
- Thomson Mason (sometimes known as Thompson Mason)
- Thomas Massie
- William Massie
- George Mathews
- Samuel Mathews, Jr. (governor)
- Samuel Matthews, Sr. (captain)
- Charles May
- John Mayo
- David Meade
- Thomas Meares
- Henry Meese
- William Melling
- George Menefie
- George Mercer
- James Mercer
- Samuel Meredith
- Francis Meriwether
- Nicholas Meriwether
- William Meriwether
- Edwards Mihill
- Adiel Milby
- Henry Mills
- Francis Milner
- (Colonel) Thomas Milner
- Thomas Milner
- Valentine Minge
- Richard Mitchell
- Robert Mitchell
- William Mitchell (sometimes spelled Michell)
- Andrew Monroe
- Andrew Monroe
- James Montague
- Peter Montague
- (Captain) John Moone
- Augustine Moore
- Bernard Moore · Francis Morgan [burgess 1647, 1652, 1653]• Thomas Morlatt (sometimes spelled Morlet)
- William Morley
- George Morris
- Joseph Morton
- Francis Moryson
- Arthur Moseley
- Edward Moseley
- Edward Hack Moseley
- Edward Hack Moseley, Jr.
- William Moseley
- James Moss
- (Colonel) John Mottrom
- John Mottrom, Jr.
- Theodore Moyses (sometimes spelled Moyse)
- (Colonel) Robert Munford
- Robert Munford
- Robert Munford
- Salvator Muscoe

== N ==
- Abner Nash
- John Nash
- Thomas Nash
- Christopher Neale
- John Neale
- Richard Neale
- Thomas Nelson
- Thomas Nelson, Jr.
- William Nelson
- Joseph Neville
- George Newton
- Thomas Newton
- Alexander Newman
- George Nicholas
- John Nicholas
- Robert Carter Nicholas, Sr.
- Tristram Norsworthy
- John Norton
- William Norvell
- Benjamin Nottingham

== O ==
- Thomas Oldis
- Edward Osborne, Jr.
- Richard Osborne
- (Captain) Thomas Osborne
- Thomas Osborne
- (Captain) Thomas Ousley

== P ==
- John Page
- John Page
- John Page
- Mann Page, Jr.
- Mann Page III
- Matthew Page
- Anthony Pagett
- Thomas Palmer
- Daniel Parke, Sr.
- Mr. Parker
- Sacker Parker
- Thomas Parker
- Thomas Parramore
- Richard Pate
- Thomas Pate
- James Patton (burgess/ colonel of Virginia Militia)
- (Captain) Thomas Pawlett
- Florentine Payne
- John Payne
- Josias Payne
- William Peeine
- William Peirce
- Edmund Pendleton
- Henry Pendleton
- John Pendleton
- Mr. Perkins
- Peter Perkins
- Richard Perrott
- Henry Perry
- Peter Perry
- (Captain) William Perry
- Thomas Pettus
- Francis Peyton
- Henry Peyton
- John Peyton
- Yelverton Peyton
- John Phelps
- William Pierce
- (Captain) John Pinkard
- Robert Pitt
- Thomas Pitt
- John Pollington (sometimes shown as John Polentine or similar variations)
- Henry Poole
- William Popleton (sometimes spelled as Popkton)
- John Porter
- William Portlock
- John Pory
- (Captain) Francis Pott
- John Powell
- John Powell Jr.
- John Powell
- (Captain) William Powell
- Mr. Power
- James Power
- Francis Poythress
- John Poythress
- Peter Poythress
- Peter Presly
- Peter Presly Jr.
- William Presly
- William Preston
- Arthur Price
- Thomas Price
- Walter Price
- Edward Prince
- Thomas Prosser
- Daniel Pugh
- (Captain) Thomas Purifoy (sometimes spelled as Purefoy)
- James Pyland

== R ==
- (Captain) Edward Ramsey
- Thomas Ramsey (sometimes spelled Ramshawe)
- Beverley Randolph
- Henry Randolph
- Isham Randolph
- John Randolph
- Sir John Randolph
- Peter Randolph
- Peyton Randolph
- Richard Randolph
- Richard Randolph II
- Thomas Randolph
- Thomas Mann Randolph Sr.
- Thomas Randolph of Tuckahoe
- William Randolph
- William Randolph II
- William Randolph III
- (Captain) James Ransone
- Peter Ransone
- Thomas Ravenscroft
- Clement Read
- Clement Read, Jr.
- Isaac Read
- George Reade
- Robert Reade
- Christopher Reynolds
- Randall Revell
- Richard Richards
- John Richardson (sometimes spelled Richinson)
- Richard Richardson
- James Ricketts
- James Riddick (sometimes spelled Reddick)
- Lemuel Riddick
- Willis Riddick
- Peter Ridley
- Joseph Ring
- Spencer Roane
- William Roane
- John Robins
- Obedience Robins
- (Colonel) Christopher Robinson
- Christopher Robinson Sr.
- Christopher Robinson Jr.
- Henry Robinson
- John Robinson Sr.
- John Robinson Jr. or Speaker
- Peter Robinson
- William Robinson
- William Robinson
- William Robinson
- John Rogers
- Richard Rogers
- (Colonel) George Rootes
- James Roscow
- William Roscow
- William Roper
- Ensign Edmund Rossingham
- Lionel Rowlston (sometimes spelled Lyonel Rowlston)
- John Ruffin
- Robert Ruffin
- Robert Rutherford
- Thomas Rutherford

== S ==
- Rowland Sadler
- Joseph Salmon
- Samuel Sanford
- John Sandiford
- Roger Saunders
- (Captain) Joseph Savage
- Robert Savin
- Francis Sayer
- Charles Scarborough (sometimes spelled Charles Scarburgh)
- (Captain) Edmund Scarborough Sr. (sometimes spelled Edmond Scarburgh)
- (Colonel) Edmund Scarborough (sometimes spelled Edmund Scarsborough)
- (Colonel) Edmund Scarborough
- Henry Scarburgh, Jr.
- Martin Scarlett
- Robert Scotchmore
- Edward Scott
- James Scott
- John Scott
- Samuel Scott
- Thomas Scott
- Henry Seawell
- Thomas Seely
- James Selden
- John Seward
- Samuel Sharpe (sometimes spelled Samuel Sharp)
- (Sergeant) William Sharpe (sometimes spelled William Sharp)
- Walter Shelley
- Robert Shephard (sometimes spelled Shepherd)
- John Shepherd
- John Sheppard
- Thomas Sheppard
- Michael Sherman
- William Sherwood
- John Sidney
- John Simmons
- Southey Simpson
- John Sipsey
- Joseph Sipsey
- Reuben Skelton
- Francis Slaughter
- Robert Slaughter
- Thomas Slaughter
- Colonel Arthur Smith
- Arthur Smith
- Augustine Smith
- Charles Smith
- Francis Smith
- Isaac Smith
- (Major) John Smith
- John Smith
- John Smith
- John Smith
- (Colonel) Lawrence Smith
- Lawrence Smith
- Meriwether Smith
- Nicholas Smith
- Nicholas Smith
- Toby Smith
- John Smyth sometimes spelled John Smythe
- Henry Soane
- William Soane
- Thomas Southcoat, probably "Otho" Southcoat
- John Southern sometimes spelled John Southerne
- Cuthbert Span
- James Speed
- Thomas Speke
- Alexander Spence
- Nicholas Spencer
- (Ensign) William Spence (sometimes spelled Spense)
- William Spencer
- John Spier
- John Spotswood
- Henry Spratt
- Robert Stacy
- John Stanup
- Bolling Starke
- Thomas Stegg
- Thomas Stegg Jr.
- George Stephens
- (Captain) Richard Stephens
- Drury Stith
- Drury Stith
- (Major) John Stith
- (Captain) John Stith II
- (Lieutenant Colonel) John Stith III
- Thomas Stith
- Christopher Stokes
- (Captain) John Stone
- Joshua Story
- Samuel Stoughton
- Mister Strafferton
- Joseph Stratton
- (Captain) Edward Streeter
- John Stretchley
- John Stringer
- William Strother
- George Stubblefield
- Alexander Swann
- Samuel Swann
- Thomas Swann Sr.
- (Captain) Thomas Swann Jr.
- Thomas Swearingen
- Meritt Sweeney sometimes spelled Swinney
- John Syme
- John Syme

== T ==
- Edward Tabb
- John Tabb
- Thomas Tabb
- John Talbot
- John Taliaferro
- Walker Taliaferro
- William Taliaferro
- John Tarpley
- John Tatem
- John Tayloe I
- John Tayloe II
- William Tayloe (the nephew)
- William Tayloe (the immigrant)
- Ethelred Taylor
- George Taylor
- Henry Taylor
- James Taylor
- John Taylor
- Philip Taylor
- Thomas Taylor
- William Taylor
- William Taylor
- William Taylor
- Henry Tazewell
- Foushee Tebbs
- Nathaniel Terry
- Edwin Thacker
- Cornelius Thomas
- Edward Thomas
- William Thomas
- George Thompson
- John Thompson
- Samuel Thompson
- Thomas Thornbury
- Francis Thornton
- (Major) John Thornton
- (Colonel) John Thornton
- Peter Thornton
- Presley Thornton
- William Thornton
- William Thornton
- William Thornton
- Otho Thorpe
- Adam Thoroughgood sometimes spelled Thorowgood
- Adam Thoroughgood sometimes spelled Thorowgood
- John Thoroughgood sometimes spelled Thorowgood
- Malachi Thruston
- Robert Todd
- Richard Townsend
- John Trahorne
- Raleigh Travers
- Samuel Travers
- (Colonel) William Travers
- Champion Travis
- Edward Travis
- Edward Champion Travis
- Richard Tree
- Alexander Trent
- Stephen Trigg
- John Trussell
- (Colonel) Robert Tucker
- Robert Tucker
- (Captain) William Tucker
- James Tuke sometimes spelled Took
- Edward Tunstall
- (Colonel) Richard Tunstall
- John Turberville
- Harry Turner
- Thomas Turner

== U ==
- (Major) William Underwood
- John Upshaw
- (Captain) John Upton
- John Utie (sometimes spelled Utey or Uty)

== V ==
- Robert Vaulx
- Thomas Veal
- George Veale
- Abraham Venable
- Nathaniel Venable

== W ==
- Robert Wade
- William Wager
- Anthony Walke
- Thomas Walke
- James Walker
- John Walker
- John Walker
- Peter Walker
- Thomas Walker
- Thomas Walker
- John Wall
- James Wallace
- Benjamin Waller
- John Waller
- William Waller
- George Wallings
- Isaac Row Walton
- (Lieutenant Colonel) Seth Ward
- (Captain) John Warde (sometimes spelled John Ward)
- John Wareham
- Thomas Wareham
- Francis Waring
- Thomas Waring
- Thomas Waring Jr.
- Thomas Warne
- John Warren
- Thomas Warren
- Augustine Warner Jr.
- John Washbourn
- Ensign Washer
- Augustine Washington Jr.
- George Washington
- (Lieutenant Colonel) John Washington
- Lawrence Washington
- Edward Waters
- William Waters
- William Waters
- Benjamin Watkins
- Henry Watkins
- Micajah Watkins
- Abraham Watson
- Joseph Watson
- Matthew Watts
- James Waugh
- John Waugh
- Roger Webster
- Giles Webb
- Lewis Webb
- Stephen Webb
- Wingfield Webb
- Richard Webster
- Roger Webster
- Abraham Weekes
- John Weir sometimes spelled John Weyer
- Thomas Wellbourne sometimes spelled Welbourn (sometimes spelled Wellborn)
- Poynes Weldon
- Richard Wells
- (Colonel) Francis West
- Hugh West
- Hugh West Jr.
- (Colonel) John West
- (Governor) John West
- John West III
- (Captain) John West
- (Captain) Nathaniel West
- Thomas West
- Thomas West
- James Westcomb
- John Westhorpe
- William Westwood
- Worlich Westwood
- Robert Wetherall
- James Whaley
- (Captain) Jabez Whitaker
- (Captain) Richard Whitaker
- Walter Whitaker
- William Whitaker
- Richard Whittaker
- William Whitby
- Alexander White
- John White
- William White
- Philip Whitehead
- Beverley Whiting
- Henry Whiting
- Thomas Whiting
- William Whittington
- Daniel Wild
- Thomas Wilford
- John Wilkins
- John Wilkinson
- (Captain) John Willcox
- (Captain) John Willcox
- Robert Williams
- James Williamson
- Robert Williamson
- Francis Willis
- (Colonel) Henry Willis
- John Willis
- John Willoughby
- (Captain) Thomas Willoughby
- John S. Wills
- Miles Wills
- James Wilson
- John Wilson
- John Wilson
- William Wilson
- Willis Wilson
- Willis Wilson
- Edward Windham
- John Winn
- Anthony Winston
- John Wise
- (Captain) John Withers
- Abraham Wood
- Henry Wood
  - (Colonel) James Wood
- James Wood
- Percival Wood
- William Woodbridge
- Henry Woodhouse
- Horatio Woodhouse
- John Woodson
- Christopher Woodward
- Joseph Woory
- George Worleigh
- William Worlich sometimes spelled Worledge, Woolritch
- Ralph Wormeley Jr.
- Ralph Wormeley Sr.
- Ralph Wormeley (Virginia politician)
- Christopher Wright
- John Wright
- William Wright
- Anthony Wyatt
- Joshua Wynne
- (Captain) Robert Wynne
- George Wythe
- Thomas Wythe

== Y ==
- Francis Yeardley (sometimes spelled Yardley)
- George Yeardley
- Hugh Yeo
- Leonard Yeo
- (Captain) Thomas Yowell (sometimes spelled Youell)
- Richard Yarborough

== Z ==
- Isaac Zane

== See also ==
- List of speakers of the Virginia House of Burgesses
