= Augustine Moore (planter) =

American planter (1685–1743)

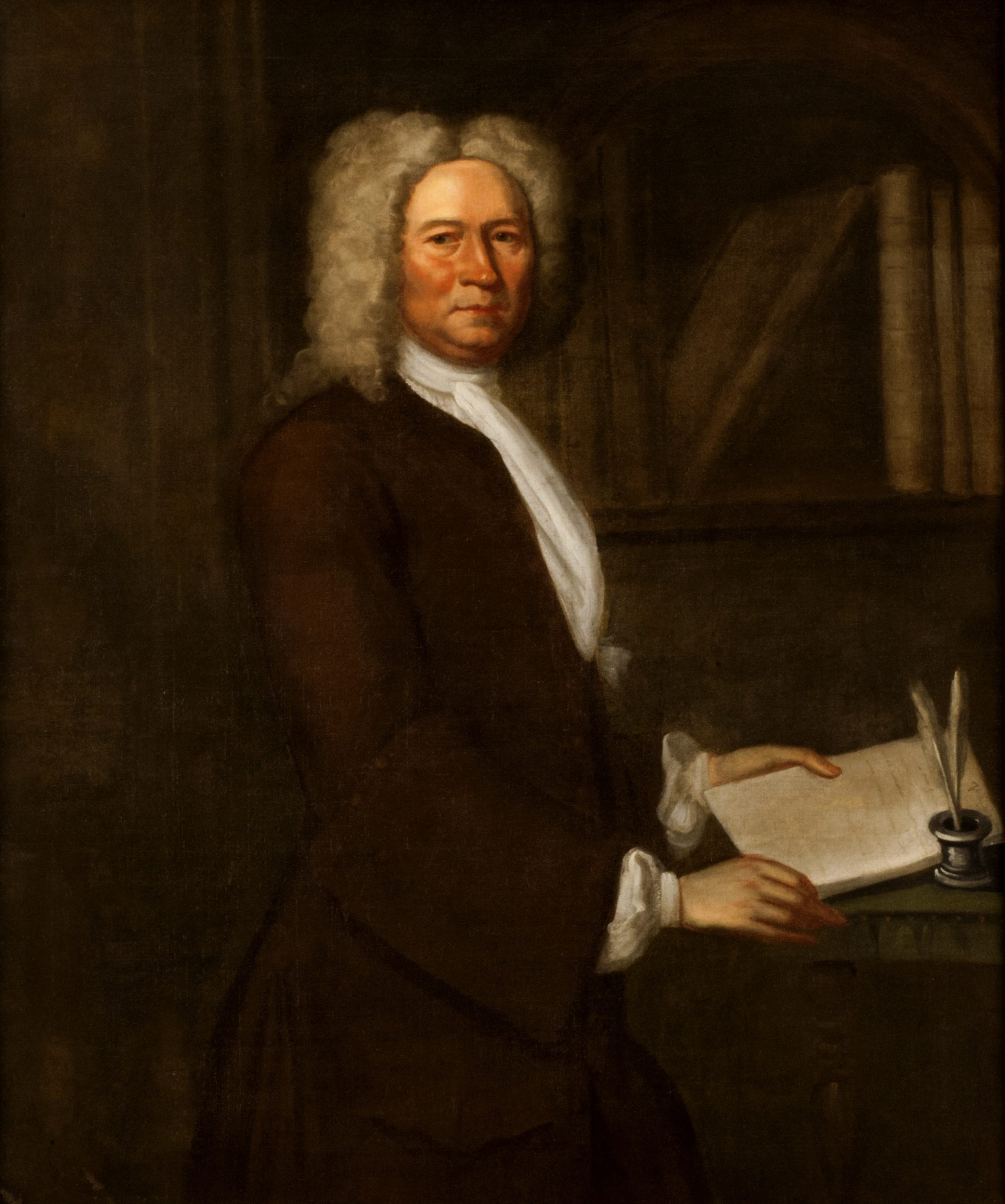
- Born: circa 1685; England
- Died: July 28, 1743; King William County, Colony of Virginia, US
- Citizenship: Kingdom of Great Britain
- Occupations: Planter, militia officer, politician
- Known for: Chelsea plantation,
- Spouse(s): Mary Gage (d. 1713); Elizabeth Todd Seaton
- Children: Bernard Moore (son), John Robinson (son-in-law)
- Relatives: Bernard Moore Jr., Augustine Moore (grandsons)

Augustine Moore (circa 1685–July 28, 1743), nicknamed "Old Grubb", was a prominent tobacco merchant who became a planter and founder of the Moore family of Virginia. He may be best known for building Chelsea plantation, now on the National Register of Historic Places and one of the best-preserved 18th century buildings in the state.

== Early and family life ==
Moore emigrated from England about 1705 and made a fortune in the tobacco trade. Descendants traced their lineage to Sir Thomas More, Lord Chancellor of England, although some disagreement exists. He married Mary Gage in England, but she died in childbirth in the Virginia colony in 1713, with mother and child buried at Chelsea.

In 1715 Moore remarried, to the widow Elizabeth Todd Seaton, who had inherited Toddsbury Plantation in Gloucester County from her father Thomas Todd (1660–1724), and had a dower interest in land in Spotsylvania County as well as a King William County plantation called Romancoke from her first husband, Henry Seaton (1659–1713). Her mother, Elizabeth Bernard, was the daughter of Col. William Bernard and his wife Lucy Hickerson (widow of Lewis Burwell). Elizabeth Seaton Moore's infant son with Henry Seaton, George Seaton (1711–1750) would inherit that property upon reaching legal age. Thus, Augustine Moore raised him at his Chelsea plantation, together with his own children.

Augustine Moore took care that his children married well, so that his descendants became among the First Families of Virginia. His eldest daughter Elizabeth Moore (1716–1779) may have married first Lyonell Lloyd (who died in 1737) before she married Col. James Macon (1721–1768), and their daughters Mary and Elizabeth married Burgesses William Aylett and Bartholomew Dandridge. Augustine Moore's firstborn son, Augustine Moore, may not have married and definitely died before 1760, when his brothers Bernard and Thomas inherited his lands pursuant to the terms of this man's will. During this man's lifetime, their sister Lucy (1716- circa 1750) married the influential widower John Robinson.

== Career ==
After sailing to Virginia, Moore initially settled in Isle of Wight County, then bought land to the west in the York River watershed. He gained the nickname "Old Grubb" because he cleared so much land. Chelsea is near the Mattaponi River in King William County, about six miles upstream from its junction with the Pamunkey River which thus forms the York River at present day West Point. Augustine Moore bought the land from the Graves family in 1705, and by 1709 had erected a weatherboard house with a brick foundation. Between 1723 and 1740 Moore built a Georgian style brick house on the property, which his son and principal heir, Bernard Moore, expanded to fit his large family circa 1755–1760.

Augustine Moore farmed tobacco at least in part using enslaved labor. He held local offices including on the vestry of the local parish and as an officer of the local militia. He also hired the painter Charles Bridges to paint portraits of his family, which were hung at Chelsea, but most of which are now owned by the Colonial Williamsburg foundation. His descendant, future CSA General Robert E. Lee, often visited his grandmother at Chelsea and spent time in the room where they hung, reportedly saying, “I don't like to leave my ancestors, these old Romans.”

Moore became a friend of Governor Alexander Spotswood, and family tradition claims that the Knights of the Golden Horseshoe were organized at Chelsea, then proceeded across the Mattaponi River to rest the next day at the home of Robert Beverley, before a rendezvous at Germanna in then-vast Orange County.

== Death and legacy ==
Old Grubb Moore died on July 28, 1743, survived by his widow and several children, including Bernard Moore, who inherited Chelsea and named his firstborn son Augustine Moore (who eventually represented King William County in the Virginia House of Delegates) after his father. His grandsons Bernard(d.1805) and Alexander Spotswood Moore fought for independence during the American Revolutionary War, and General Lafayette camped at Chelsea shortly before the Yorktown siege that ended the conflict. The widow of Alexander Spotswood Moore (1763-1799) married Col. Joseph Hamilton and took her young family to Tennessee, where some remained while others moved to Alabama.

Moore's descendants sold Chelsea in 1874, and it passed through several hands before being restored and placed on the National Register of Historic Places in 1969. The Historic Virginia Land Conservancy has held a conservancy easement on the property since 2012.
