= Samuel Sharp =

Samuel or Sammy Sharp may refer to:

- Samuel Sharp (surgeon) (1700?–1778), British surgeon and author, of Jamaican birth
- Samuel Sharp (geologist) (1814–1882), English geologist
- Sammy Sharp, 1920s footballer who played for Manchester City
- Sam Sharp, 1973 co-founder of Loaf 'N Jug convenience stores
- Samuel Sharpe (burgess), 17th-century Virginia colonist

== See also ==
- Samuel Sharpe (disambiguation)
