= Abrahall =

Abrahall is a surname. Notable people with the surname include:

- Colin Abrahall, vocalist for English band GBH
- John Abrahall (fl. 1413 – d. 1443), English politician
- Robert Abrahall (fl. c. 1650 – 1690), early American politician
- Anthony Hoskyns-Abrahall (1903–1982), English bishop
- Clare H Abrahall (1900–1990), English writer
