= Francis West (disambiguation) =

Francis West (1586–1633/4) was the deputy governor of the Colony and Dominion of Virginia.

Francis West may also refer to:

- Francis West (bishop) (1908–1999), bishop of Taunton in the Church of England
- Francis West (colonel) (1711–1796), sheriff of King William County in the Colony and Dominion of Virginia and its representative in the House of Burgesses
- Francis H. West (1825–1896), Union Army general
- Francis Robert West (c. 1749–1809), Irish artist, draughtsman and teacher
- Bing West (Francis J. West, born 1940), American military writer and former Defense Department official

== See also ==
- Frank West (disambiguation)
- Francis Weston (1511–1536), courtier executed for alleged adultery with Queen Anne Boleyn
