= Samuel Sharpe (disambiguation) =

Samuel Sharpe (1801–1832) was a slave leader in Jamaica.

Samuel Sharpe may also refer to:

- Samuel Sharpe (burgess) (fl. 1619–1623), English colonist and member of Virginia House of Burgesses
- Samuel Sharpe (scholar) (1799–1881), English Unitarian Egyptologist and translator of the Bible
- Samuel Sharpe (cricketer) (1839–1924), English cricketer
- Samuel Simpson Sharpe (1873–1918), Canadian lawyer and political figure in Ontario

== See also ==
- Samuel Sharp (disambiguation)
