= John Wellborn =

John Wellborn, or variant, may refer to:

== People ==
- John Wellborn II (17th c.), father of Thomas Wellbourne
- John Welborn (born 1970), Australian rugby player
- John Welborn (representative) (1857–1907), American politician
- John Welborn, player of American football on the 1976 Texas A&M Aggies football team
- John Welborn, American baseball player at the 2014 Conference USA baseball tournament
- John Welborne (21st c.), publisher of the Larchmont Chronicle
- John Welbourn (born 1976), American player of American football
- John William Welbourn (1900–1965), Canadian politician
- John Welbourne (14th–15th c.), Archdeacon of Cambridge
- John Wellburn (WWII), British RAF officer; see List of RAF aircrew in the Battle of Britain (A–C)
- John Welburn (19th c.), executive of the North Eastern Railway (United Kingdom)
- Jack Welborn (1932–2021), American politician in Michigan

== Characters ==
- John Wellborn, a fictional character from the 1921 film The Big Adventure

== See also ==
- John Wellborn Martin (1884–1958), American politician
- John Wellborn Root (1850–1891), American architect
- John Wellborn Root Jr. (1887–1963), American architect
