= Henry Whiting =

Henry Whiting may refer to:

- Henry H. Whiting (1923–2012), member of the Supreme Court of Virginia
- Henry Whiting (burgess) (1640–1694), Virginia physician, planter, military officer and member of the House of Burgesses
