= William Aylett =

William Aylett may refer to:

- Bill Aylett (William Edward Aylett, 1900–1976), Australian politician
- Aylett family of Virginia, which included three noted family members named William Aylett
