= John Pollington =

Virginia colonist; burgess

Member Virginia House of Burgesses
- In office 1619–1624

Personal details
- Born: c. 1593 London, Kingdom of England
- Occupation: Merchant

John Pollington (sometimes shown as John Polentine or Pollentin) (Note: Hening, William Waller. The Statutes at Large; being a Collection of all the Laws of Virginia, from the First Session of the Legislature, in the year 1619, Volume I. New York: Published pursuant to an act of the General Assembly of Virginia, passed on the Fifth day of February One Thousand Eight Hundred and Eight, Printed By and For Samuel Pleasants, Junior, Printer for the Commonwealth, 1809, p. 129, shows the name as John Pollington, as does Haile, Edward Wright, ed. Jamestown Narratives: Eyewitness Accounts of the Virginia Colony: The First Decade: 1607-1617. Champlain, VA: RoundHouse, 1998. ISBN 978-0-9664712-0-5. p. 916. These are pages cited by McCartney, Martha W. Virginia immigrants and adventurers, 1607-1635: a biographical dictionary. Baltimore: Genealogical Pub. Co., 2007. ISBN 978-0-8063-1774-8. p. 564, who nonetheless spells the name John Polentine (Pollentin). The list of the members of the 1619 general assembly at Stanard, William G. and Mary Newton Stanard. The Virginia Colonial Register. Albany, NY: Joel Munsell's Sons Publishers, 1902. OCLC 253261475, Retrieved July 15, 2011, p. 52 also shows John Polentine based on a manuscript copy of the Journal of this session in the Public Records office in London, although on the next page, it shows John Pollington as a representative in the 1623-24 session. In turn, several journal articles about the first assembly, such as Henry, William Wirt. The First Legislative Assembly in America. In Annual Report of the American Historical Association for the Year 1893. Washington, Government Printing Office, 1894. OCLC 1150082. Retrieved July 21, 2011. p. 60 follow with the spelling John Polentine. McIlwaine, H. R. Journals of the House of Burgesses of Virginia, 1619-1658/59. Richmond, VA: The Colonial Press, E. Waddey Co. 1915. OCLC 928955416. p. vii shows John Polentine, but notes this is probably Pollington and uses that name for the 1623/24 session list on the next page, citing Brown, Alexander, The First Republic in America, pp. 579, 580. Tyler, Lyon Gardiner in Encyclopedia of Virginia biography. New York: Lewis Historical Pub. Co., 1915. OCLC 866770546. Retrieved July 21, 2011. p. 306 shows the name as John Pollington for both sessions. Virginia in 1626-27 (Continued) The Virginia Magazine of History and Biography, Published by: Virginia Historical Society, July, 1908, Vol. 16, No. 1, p. 31, has a footnote by W. N. Sainsbury stating that "John Pollington, or Polentine as it is sometimes written" was a member for the two assemblies. The same document, the "Petition of the Governor and the Assembly to the King," July 3, 1624 shows the name as Pollington. Since sources, including McCartney, show that the same person was the member for the 1619 and 1623/24 sessions, it appears that the sources which use "Pollington", including Tyler, should be accepted as the more accurate.) was an early Virginia colonist who was a member of the first assembly of the Virginia House of Burgesses at Jamestown, Virginia in 1619 for the "Citie" of Henricus, Virginia. In 1624, he was a burgess for Warrosquyoake Shire sometimes shown as Warresqueak and other variations, now Isle of Wight County, Virginia. He also was a landowner and merchant.

By the date of the Muster Roll of 1624/5 (census), Pollington had moved to Warresqueak with his wife Rachel and with Margaret Polentine, who Martha McCartney surmises was their daughter.

Pollington signed the letter of the governor, councillors and burgesses replying to Alderman Johnson (Alderman [Robert] Johnson), who claimed that the colony thrived in its early years in contrast to the current dire state of the colony.

The list of land patents sent to England in May 1625 showed Pollington with 600 acres of land in Warresqueak.

The Colonial Records for Virginia show:

"July 6, 7, 1626. Examinations of John Preen of London, Merchant aged 36, Thomas Willoughby of Rochester aged 27 and John Pollington of London, Merchant, aged 33. That the only intent of their voyage to Virginia is to carry passengers, goods and munition for the plantation there."

In June 1628, Rachel Pollington was listed as an exporter of tobacco. On February 10, 1629 the General Court decided in a dispute between her and John Moon(e) that she was entitled to the house she occupied, a tobacco house, half the crops and half the land and should lease the other half of the land and other houses on the property to Moone. McCartney states that the date of John Pollington's death is uncertain but the information about Rachel's dealings and property suggest that John Pollington had died by a date in 1628 or 1629.
