= William Sharpe (burgess) =

English-born Virginia colonist and burgess (1580–1635)

Member Virginia House of Burgesses
- In office 1629–1629

Personal details
- Born: 1580 England
- Died: 1635 (aged 54–55) Jones Neck, Virginia
- Spouse: Elizabeth Sharpe
- Children: Isack, Samuell
- Occupation: Planter, Burgess

Military service
- Branch/service: Virginia colonial militia
- Rank: Sergeant, Lieutenant

William Sharpe (sometimes referred to as Sergeant Sharp or William Sharp) was an early Virginia colonist, soldier, ancient planter, and Virginia Company shareholder who settled in the Bermuda Hundred area that became part of Charles City County, Virginia. He served in the Virginia House of Burgesses in Jamestown, Virginia, in 1629.

== Burgess Samuel Sharpe distinguished ==
William Sharpe should not be confused with Samuel Sharpe, another early Virginia colonist, soldier, and ancient planter who settled in Charles City, Virginia and was a burgess in the first general assembly of the Virginia House of Burgesses in 1619 with whom he is sometimes erroneously conflated.

Samuel Sharpe was a soldier whom came to Virginia in 1610 with most of the passengers and crew of the Sea Venture as they made their way to the colony after 10 months in Bermuda where they had wrecked in a storm. The castaways built two small boats to complete their journey to Jamestown.

William Sharpe, also an ancient planter and a shareholder in the Virginia Company, came to Virginia on the Starr in May 1611. (Note: According to * Kolb, Avery E. Early Passengers to Virginia: When Did They Really Arrive?, The Virginia Magazine of History and Biography, Vol. 88, No. 4. Oct. 1980, p. 412, the Starr, JSTOR 4248428 – also made trips to Virginia in 1608 and 1610.)

In Stanard, in Wirt and Grizzard and Smith, Samuel Sharpe (not shown as "Sergeant") is listed as a burgess in the 1619 general assembly for Charles City. He is not listed as a burgess in the 1624 general assembly in Stanard, although he signed the letter of burgesses replying to Alderman Robert Johnson in 1624. On the other hand, he is listed in McIlwaine, H. R., ed. Volume 1 of Journals of the House of Burgesses, 1619–1658/59. Richmond, VA, 1915, p. viii, as a burgess for Westover, an incorporation of Charles City, in the 1623/24 assembly.

A burgess identified as "Sergeant Sharp" (no first name, no "e" at the end of the name) is listed as a burgess for the "Neck of Land" (which was later called “Jones Neck”) for the 1629 session in both Stanard Henings. "Sergeant Sharp" was "William G. Sharpe (Sharp)", also of Charles City, and a burgess in the 1629 list for the Neck of Land, not Samuel Sharpe. Lyon Gardiner Tyler, has a brief biographical paragraph concerning "Samuel Sharpe" which identifies him as a burgess for Charles City in the 1619 session and the Neck of Land in the October 1625 session. A 1625 session is not shown in the Stanard or Henings or McCartney Sharpe (Sharp) entries but is mentioned in Grizzard. It is shown in McIlwaine, H. R., ed. Volume 1 of Journals of the House of Burgesses, 1619–1658/59. Richmond, VA, 1915 as a convention, but the member list, which is based on Brown, Alexander, The First Republic in America, pp. 579, 580, does not include Samuel Sharpe, "Sergeant Sharpe" or William Sharpe. In the Introduction, p. xxv, the editor explains: "The material found in this volume is not made up altogether, or even in the main, of entire Journals of the House of Burgesses or of excerpts from these Journals, but of a few such excerpts, it is true, and of such papers of the House and of the General or Grand Assembly as a whole as are extant and have been found by the editor of the volume."

While McIlwaine's Journals of the House of Burgesses of Virginia, 1619–1658/59 shows "Samuel Sharpe" as a burgess for the Neck of Land in the 1629 assembly, the entry is based on Stanard, 1902, pp. 54, 55, which actually show the member as "Sergeant Sharp". The Lists of the Livinge & the Dead in Virginia, compiled February 16, 1623, shows "Serjeant William Sharpe" residing at the Neck of Land, Tyler gives no further information about Samuel Sharpe after 1625. Based on McCartney which has no information about Samuel Sharpe after 1626, and Grizzard which shows the members of the First General Assembly and their fates if known and which indicates that Samuel Sharpe's fate is unknown, and the entry on the Lists of the Living & the Dead in Virginia, 1623, Samuel Sharpe was not the "Sergeant Sharp" of the 1629 assembly. That burgess was William Sharpe (Sharp), as stated by McCartney with citations.

== Controversies ==
McCartney states that Sharpe's superiors discussed remarks he made while inebriated which complained about a British government decision that gave the right to trade with incoming ships to official British merchants to the exclusion of that right for individual plantations. Sharpe and three others also lost a suit to Richard Taylor in January 1629 in which Taylor accused the men of preventing him from using land for which he held a patent from Governor George Yeardley.

== Burgess ==
In 1629, William Sharpe represented Charles City (sometimes referred to as Bermuda City) in the Virginia House of Burgesses.

== Wife and property ==
Records showed that William Sharpe and his wife Elizabeth were living at Bermuda Hundred Plantation on February 16, 1624, and were still there on January 20, 1625, with their sons, Samuell, age 2, and Isack, age 2 months. In a list of patented land sent to England in 1625, Sharpe was shown with 40 acres in Charles City, the location of Bermuda Hundred.

== Death ==
William Sharpe died after October 1629 but before February 12, 1635, when his widow, Elizabeth, who identified herself as William Sharpe's widow, patented land in the Varina area of Henrico County, just east of Henricus Island, on the basis of headrights.

== See also ==
- List of members of the Virginia House of Burgesses
