= William Spencer (burgess) =

Virginia colonist and burgess

Member Virginia House of Burgesses
- In office 1632/33–1632/33

Personal details
- Born: England
- Died: Virginia
- Spouse: Alice Spencer
- Children: Alice, Anne, Elizabeth, William
- Occupation: Ancient planter (tobacco farmer), Burgess
- Nickname: "Virginia's First Farmer"

Military service
- Branch/service: militia

William Spencer (sometimes shown as William Spenser) was an early Virginia colonist on Jamestown Island, who was an Ancient planter and a member of the Virginia House of Burgesses in Jamestown, Virginia for Mulberry Island in 1632/33.

== William Spence distinguished ==
William Spencer is sometimes erroneously conflated with William Spence, another early Virginia colonist who also lived on Jamestown Island. (Note: Early Virginia records contain many errors and omissions in passenger lists, ship arrival dates and thus in the arrival dates of many early colonists in the Muster Roll of 1625 and other documents. Incomplete and inaccurate Virginia Company records make it harder to determine arrival dates or correct other errors concerning early colonists. Kolb, Avery E. "Early Passengers to Virginia: When Did They Really Arrive?", The Virginia Magazine of History and Biography, Vol. 88, No. 4, Oct. 1980, p. 401-402. JSTOR 4248428) William Spence came to Virginia in the First Supply mission to Jamestown in 1608. Spence was member of the first assembly of the Virginia House of Burgesses in 1619. William Spence is sometimes distinguished by his military title of Ensign William Spence or Ensign Spence.

William, his wife and his young daughter, Sara, or Sarah, avoided the Indian massacre of 1622, but Spence and his wife were reported "lost" at the census of February 16, 1624. Their daughter was placed with a guardian by the General Court at Jamestown by early 1625.

William Spencer later became a member of the House of Burgesses for Mulberry Island for the 1632–33 and 1633 session, eight years after William Spence was lost and presumed dead.

== Arrival at Jamestown ==
Martha McCartney states, with citations, that Spencer arrived in the "Sarah or Susan Constant." (Note: The Susan Constant has occasionally been referred to erroneously as the "Sarah Constant", as noted in Grizzard, Frank E. and Dennis Boyd Smith. Jamestown Colony: A Political, Social and Cultural History. Santa Barbara, CA: ABC-CLIO, 2007. ISBN 978-1-85109-637-4, p. 216, but this was shown to be in error by Robinson, Gregory, and Robin R. Goodison. "Sarah versus Susan". The William and Mary Quarterly 16, No. 4, 1936. pp. 515–21.) The phrase "Sarah" or "Susan", as stated by McCartney does not require the interpretation that it refers to the Susan Constant since a ship named the Sara(h) arrived at Jamestown in August 1611 with the returning Sir Thomas Gates (governor). Spencer's arrival on the Sarah is consistent with references to Spencer arriving in Jamestown in 1611 on the Sarah, the absence of his name from the Susan Constant passenger list or the list of first settlers and McCartney's further sketch. (Note: The Sarah is also shown as arriving at Jamestown in May/June 1612. McCartney, 2007, p. 322; Kolb, A. E., "Early Passengers to Virginia: When Did They Really Arrive?", 1980, p. 412.) The Virtual Jamestowne site also shows that William Spencer arrived on the Sarah as shown in the Muster Roll of 1624/5.

== Property and family ==
Because of his early arrival at Jamestown and continued residence there, Spencer was considered an "Ancient planter", which was simply a descriptive term for early Virginia colonists who arrived when the colony was managed by the Virginia Company of London. They received land grants if they stayed in the colony for at least three years. Under the terms of the "Instructions to Governor Yeardley" issued by the London Company in 1618, these colonists received the first land grants in Virginia.

On August 14, 1624, William Spencer of James City, "Yeoman and Ancient Planter" secured a patent for 12 acres of land in James City described as "a narrow ridge towards Goose Hill." Goose Hill was described in a footnote as "at the lower end of Jamestown Island."

At the date of the Muster Roll of January 24, 1625 (census), Spencer was reported as residing on his property on Jamestown Island with his wife Alice and their daughter, also named Alice, who was 4 years old.

William and Alice had a young son who died some time between February 1624 and the muster of January 24, 1625 (new style calendar). They had two daughters who lived to adulthood. Anne Spencer married William Cockeram and Elizabeth Spencer married in turn Robert Sheppard, Thomas Warren and John Hunnicut.

According to McCartney, from 1620 to at least 1626 Spencer was the overseer of property in the "Governor's Land" owned by Captain William Peirce (burgess), later a member of the House of Burgesses for Jamestown in 1624 and a member of the Council of State from 1632 to 1643. He also became the overseer of John Rolfe's plantation and servants on the lower side of the James River after Rolfe died in 1622. Rolfe's, Peirce's and Spencer's servants lived on Rolfe's land after Rolfe's death.

In 1629, Spencer inherited the property of his neighbor, John Lightfoot. Also in 1629, Spencer used the headright of his wife Dorothy, who arrived on the Neptune in 1619, to patent 290 acres of land. McCartney states it is not clear whether Dorothy was Spencer's wife before or after Alice.

Spencer patented 1,350 acres of land next to Lawne's Creek in the early 1630s.

A 1635 deed of 550 acres in Surry County, Virginia to William Spencer indicated he was a justice of the county.

== Burgess ==
William Spencer was a member of the House of Burgesses in 1632/33 and later session in 1633 for Mulberry Island. (Note: In Stanard's Abstract of Spencer's land patent, July 1893, Spencer is shown as a burgess for Mulberry Island in 1623. This is an obvious typographical error since neither Stanard's Virginia Colonial Register, 1902, nor McIlwaine, H. R., ed. Volume 1 of Journals of the House of Burgesses, 1619–1658/59. Richmond, VA, 1915 OCLC 928955416 show Spencer as a member of the House of Burgesses in 1623 but both show him as a member for Mulberry Island in 1632–33 as does McCartney, 2007, p. 662. Similarly, a jury list from August 5, 1623 reprinted in Minutes of the Council and General Court, 1622–1624. The Virginia Magazine of History and Biography, Volume 19, No. 2, 1911: p. 129, JSTOR 4243124, shows "Ensign William Spenc gents" as a member. Without explicitly saying this could be either William Spence or William Spencer, a footnote states that Spence was a burgess in 1619 and Spencer was a burgess for Mulberry Island in 1623. This appears to be the same typographical error since, again, there is no list of burgesses that shows Spencer as a burgess for Mulberry Island, or any other burgess for Mulberry Island, in 1623. The article itself does not show the name of the editor who wrote the prefatory note and the footnotes.) McCartney notes that William Peirce also had an investment in property on Mulberry Island.

== Later life and death ==
McCartney states that Spencer was a tobacco viewer for the territory between Lawnes Creek and Hog Island in 1640, but land records indicate that Spencer died in 1638. McCartney also states that Spencer conducted business for Captain William Peirce as late as 1655 but also states that Peirce died before June 22, 1647 (Note: This is another inconsistency with the records showing Spencer died in 1638.)

More certain sources, land transfer records, show that Spencer died on February 10, 1637 (1638 new style). (Note: Holtzclaw, 1939, p. 568: From Surry Co., VA Deed & Will BK 1645–1671, page 287: A deed witnessed by Nicholas Spencer, Sr. and Daniel Williams. On 04 Jan 1685/6, William Cockerham (son of William) deeded to William Harris a parcel of land on Hog Island Main, part of a patent of 1350 acres "granted to Mr. William Spencer late of this county, dec'd., the 10th day of Feby., 1637 and from the said Spencer descended to me the said Cockram." William Spencer was granted two large parcels of land; the first, 19 Jun 1635, for 1100 acres was "in the tenure" of Major Robert Sheppard, who sold it to William Caulfield; the second 10 Feb 1637, for 1350 acres (cf. Nugent, p. 81) descended to William Cockerham and later to his son, William, who deeded part of it away in 1685/6. The article by Holtzclaw, October 1939, p. 368, cites this deed and other references and concludes that one of William Spencer's daughter married William Cockerham and the other married Robert Sheppard and thus William Spencer had no male heirs. This supports a date of death in 1637 (1638 new style calendar) for William Spencer, although Holtzclaw states that the exact date of Spencer's death is uncertain.)

== Notes ==
Footnotes

Additional reading

- Ancient Planters web site. Retrieved July 11, 2020.
- Grizzard, Frank E. and Dennis Boyd Smith. Jamestown Colony: A Political, Social and Cultural History. Santa Barbara, CA: ABC-CLIO, 2007. ISBN 978-1-85109-637-4.
- Holtzclaw, B. C. JSTOR 4244982 The Newsom Family: And Related Families of Surry, Isle of Wight, Southampton and Sussex Counties, Va. The Virginia Magazine of History and Biography, Volume 47 No. 4. Richmond, VA: Virginia Historical Society, October 1939. p. 386.
- Kolb, Avery E. JSTOR 4248428 Early Passengers to Virginia: When Did They Really Arrive?, The Virginia Magazine of History and Biography, Vol. 88, No. 4. Oct. 1980.
- McCartney, Martha W. Virginia immigrants and adventurers, 1607–1635: a biographical dictionary. Baltimore: Genealogical Pub. Co., 2007. ISBN 978-0-8063-1774-8.
- McIlwaine, H. R. Journals of the House of Burgesses of Virginia, 1619–1658/59. Richmond, VA: The Colonial Press, E. Waddey Co. 1915. OCLC 928955416.
- JSTOR 4243124 "Minutes of the Council and General Court, 1622–1624." The Virginia Magazine of History and Biography, Volume 19, No. 2, 1911: p. 129.
- Price, David A. Love & Hate in Jamestown: John Smith, Pocahontas and the Start of a New Nation. New York: Vintage Books, a Division of Random House, Inc., 2003. ISBN 978-1-4000-3172-6.
- Robinson, Gregory, and Robin R. Goodison. "Sarah versus Susan." The William and Mary Quarterly 16, No. 4, 1936. pp. 515–21.
- Stanard, W. G. Abstracts of Virginia Land Patents, The Virginia Magazine of History and Biography, Volume I, No. 1. Richmond, VA: House of the Society, William Ellis Jones, Printer, July 1893. p. 89.
- Stanard, William G. and Mary Newton Stanard. The Virginia Colonial Register. Albany, NY: Joel Munsell's Sons Publishers, 1902. OCLC 253261475, Retrieved July 15, 2011.
- Tyler, Lyon Gardiner in Encyclopedia of Virginia biography. New York: Lewis Historical Pub. Co., 1915. OCLC 866770546. Retrieved July 21, 2011.
- United States National Park Service. The First Residents of Jamestowne. National Park Service Historic Jamestowne page. Retrieved July 11, 2020.
- Muster Search result for William Spencer. Virtual Jamestowne web site. Retrieved August 9, 2020.
- Woolley, Benjamin. Savage Kingdom: The True Story of Jamestown, 1607, and the Settlement of America. New York: Harper Perennial, 2008. Originally published as Savage Kingdom: Virginia and the Founding of English America in the United Kingdom by HarperCollins Publishers, 2007. ISBN 978-0-06-009057-9
