= William Spence (burgess) =

Virginia colonist; burgess

Ensign William Spence
- Born: England
- Died: Colony of Virginia
- Other names: Ensign Spence, Spense
- Occupations: Labourer, Farmer, Ancient planter
- Children: Sara(h)

Member Virginia House of Burgesses
- In office 1619–1619

Military service
- Branch/service: militia
- Rank: Ensign

William Spence (sometimes shown as Spense) was an early Virginia colonist on Jamestown Island. He was member of the first assembly of the Virginia House of Burgesses in Jamestown, Virginia in 1619. Spence became an ensign in the local militia and is thus sometimes identified as Ensign William Spence or Ensign Spence. He was an early farmer on Jamestown Island, a "tobacco taster" and landowner at Archer's Hope. He, his wife and his young daughter, Sara, or Sarah, avoided the Indian massacre of 1622, but Spence and his wife were reported "lost" at the census of February 16, 1624.

== Arrival at Jamestown ==
=== Not William Spencer ===
William Spence is sometimes erroneously conflated with William Spencer I, another early Virginia colonist who also lived on Jamestown Island but did not arrive at Jamestown until 1611. William Spencer I later became a member of the House of Burgesses for Mulberry Island in 1632–33, eight years after William Spence was lost and presumed dead. (Note: Early Virginia records contain many errors and omissions in passenger lists and ship arrival dates. Thus, the exact arrival dates of many early Virginia colonists in the Muster Roll of 1625 and other documents are uncertain. Incomplete and inaccurate Virginia Company records also make it harder to determine arrival dates or correct other errors concerning early colonists. * Kolb, Avery E. Early Passengers to Virginia: When Did They Really Arrive?, The Virginia Magazine of History and Biography, Vol. 88, No. 4. Oct. 1980. JSTOR 4248428 pp. 401–402.)

=== First Supply mission ===
William Spence came to Virginia in the First Supply mission to Jamestown in 1608. He is sometimes shown in modern printed lists of passengers as both a "gentleman" and a "labourer," not only a double listing, but in seemingly inconsistent categories. On the other hand, in the names of those arriving at Jamestown in the First Supply voyage in Captain John Smith's The General History, Book 3, Chapter 4, as reprinted in Haile at page 252, Spence is only listed as a "gentleman." (Note: A footnote added by editor Edward Wright Haile to the chapter "A True Discourse" by Ralph Hamor in Haile, Edward Wright, ed. Jamestown Narratives: Eyewitness Accounts of the Virginia Colony: The First Decade: 1607–1617. Champlain, VA: RoundHouse, 1998. ISBN 978-0-9664712-0-5, p. 814 states that "In his General History, Captain John Smith wrote "from all those farmers, whereof the first was William Spence, an honest, valiant and industrious man, and hath continued from 1607 to this present [1624]." The 1607 date given in Haile's quote from a Smith writing about Spence is inconsistent with the arrival of Spence in the First Supply mission in 1608 as shown by Haile in his excerpts from Smith's The General History at p. 252 of Jamestown Narratives. It would coincide with any source which stated that William Spencer, rather than William Spence, arrived at Jamestown in 1607 on the Susan Constant, but not with usual accounts of either Spence's or Spencer's arrivals and not with online Susan Constant passenger lists which include neither name. Martha McCartney states, with citations, at McCartney, 2007, p. 661 that Spence arrived in the First Supply mission and at p. 662 that Spencer arrived in the "Sarah or Susan Constant." The Susan Constant has occasionally been referred to erroneously as the "Sarah Constant", as noted in Grizzard, Frank E. and Dennis Boyd Smith. Jamestown Colony: A Political, Social and Cultural History. Santa Barbara, CA: ABC-CLIO, 2007. ISBN 978-1-85109-637-4, p 216, but this was shown to be in error by Robinson, Gregory, and Robin R. Goodison. Sarah versus Susan. The William and Mary Quarterly 16, No. 4, 1936. pp. 515–21. Also, the phrase "Sarah or" from McCartney may not require the interpretation that it is referencing different names for the Susan Constant since a ship named the Sara(h) arrived at Jamestown in August 1611 with the returning Sir Thomas Gates (governor). That is consistent with references to Spencer arriving in Jamestown in 1611 on the Sarah the absence of his name from the Susan Constant passenger list or list of first settlers at United States National Park Service. The First Residents of Jamestowne. National Park Service Historic Jamestowne page. Retrieved July 11, 2020 and McCartney's further sketch of Spencer. McCartney, 2007, p. 322. The Sarah is also shown as arriving at Jamestown in May/June 1612. Kolb, A. E., Early Passengers to Virginia: When Did They Really Arrive?, 1980, p. 412.)

== Farmer, Landowner ==
Martha McCartney supports John Smith's statement that Spence "reportedly" was the first farmer to work his own land on Jamestown Island. She also states that in 1618 Spence offered to employ workers of the late governor, Sir Thomas West, 3rd Baron De La Warr, after West had died at sea while returning to the colony from England in summer 1618. West's subordinate, Captain Edward Brewster, to whom Spence made the offer, was prevented from taking custody of his goods by Deputy Governor Samuel Argall, who misappropriated West's laborers and artisans to work on his own projects.

== Burgess ==
Ensign William Spence, along with Captain William Powell), were members of the first general assembly of the Virginia House of Burgesses for Jamestown in July–August 1619.

== Later life ==
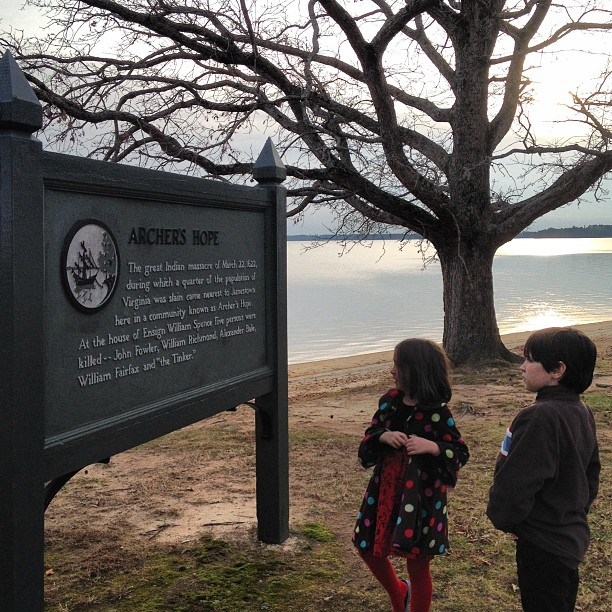
Archer's Hope historical marker mentioning Ensign William Spence

In 1619, as a "tobacco taster", Spence evaluated the quality of tobacco by sampling portions of the tobacco crop.

Because of his early arrival at Jamestown and continued residence there, Spence was considered an "Ancient planter", which was simply a descriptive term. Ancient planters were early Virginia colonists who arrived when the colony was managed by the Virginia Company of London. They received land grants if they stayed in the colony for at least three years. Under the terms of the "Instructions to Governor Yeardley" issued by the London Company in 1618, these colonists received the first land grants in Virginia. (Note: Because the surviving historical records are incomplete, and sometimes demonstrably inaccurate, it is not possible to compile a definitive list of Ancient Planters. Kolb, Avery E. Early Passengers to Virginia: When Did They Really Arrive?, The Virginia Magazine of History and Biography, Vol. 88, No. 4, Oct. 1980. pp 401–414. Kolb, pp. 403–406, reconciled many of the records and determined the most likely dates of many arrivals by finding spelling errors, transcription errors, unclear handwriting, imprecise records of ship departure and arrival dates, years recorded or remembered differently due to the continued use by some of the Julian calendar in which the year began on March 25, dual arrivals of persons who arrived, returned to England and then arrived again not long afterward (e.g., Sir Thomas Gates), confused passengers because of their long journeys and their sometimes delayed debarkation dates as well as imprecise questions about arrival or journeys that may have been asked of the colonists by the recorders of records such as the 1625 muster. These questions may have led to imprecise answers related to what was happening in England prior to departures and inexact dates or arrival, according to Kolb.)

In January 1619, William Spence along with John Fowler received a patent for 300 acres in Archer's Hope, a few miles from Jamestown. (Note: The abstract of a patent of 500 acres in Archer's Hope to Lucy Webster, Judith Webster and Jane Webster states that the property included 300 acres patented to William Spence and John Fowler in January 1619. Nugent, Nell Marion. Cavaliers and Pioneers: Abstracts of Virginia Land Patents and Grants, 1623–1800. Vol. 1. Richmond, Virginia: Press of the Dietz Co., 1934. p. 161.) Since Spence continued to live at Jamestown Island, McCartney surmises that he placed indentured servants on the property along with his partner, John Fowler, who lived there. Fowler and four others, not including Spence or his wife, were killed in the Indian massacre of 1622 at Spence's house at Archer's Hope. A list of Virginia land patents sent to England in 1625 included 300 acres in Archer's Hope in the name of William Spence.

Spence had been in England in early 1622 and he returned on the James, which departed for Jamestown on July 21, 1622. The February 16, 1624 census of the Virginia colony's inhabitants listed William Spence, his wife and his young daughter Sara(h), but Spence and his wife were shown on the list as "lost." They were also shown on a 1624 list of persons who had died since February 1623.

Spence's daughter, Sara Spence, 4 years old, was entrusted to a 20-year old widow, Mrs. Susan Bush, as guardian, at Elizabeth City, Virginia. On August 14, 1624, the General Court ordered John Johnson, who had property on Jamestown Island and at Archer's Hope, to put a roof on the house and repair the fence of Ensign William Spence, Johnson's recently deceased neighbor. After 3 months, the court also ordered Sara Spence's "guardians" to have her property at Archer's Hope surveyed. On May 16, 1625, Sara Spence's guardians, including the Reverend George Keith as well as Susan Bush, were ordered to appear before the General Court. In October 1625, having still not had the property surveyed, the guardians were told by the court that they would be fined if they did not have the land surveyed. Susan Bush placed the Spence property in the hands of a tenant, Thomas Farley, on November 21, 1625. Sara Spence died by April 3, 1627 when the court ordered the Reverend George Keith of Elizabeth City to inventory her estate. Susan Bush also may have died by this date since she was not included in the order pertaining to the Spence property.

== Death ==
Records of the exact date and manner of the deaths of William Spence and his wife have not been found. (Note: The approximate date of William Spence's death shows conclusively that William Spencer who served in the House of Burgesses representing Mulberry Island in 1632/33 was a different person.)
