= Frank West =

Frank West is the name of:

- Frank West (Medal of Honor) (1850–1923), Medal of Honor recipient
- Frank West (baseball) (1873–1932), baseball player
- Frank West (Dead Rising), the main character from the 2006 video game Dead Rising

== See also ==
- Francis West (disambiguation)
