= George Fawdon =

Early Virginia colonist, landowner, militia officer, clerk and legislative representative

Member Virginia House of Burgesses
- In office 1646–1653

Personal details
- Born: ca 1600 England
- Died: ca 1654/1655 (Aged about 54) Isle of Wight County, Virginia
- Spouse: (1) ? (2)? Ann
- Children: Hester
- Occupation: Planter, Burgess, County Justice, Militia Officer

Military service
- Branch/service: Isle of Wight County, Virginia militia
- Years of service: before 1654–1654/1655
- Rank: Major

George Fawdon (ca 1600 – ca 1654/1655), also spelled in various sources as George Fawden, George Fawder, George Fadoin, George Faudon, George Fawdoune, George Faudown, George Fawdowne, and George Fowden, was an early Virginia colonist, landowner, militia officer, county court clerk, county clerk justice and legislative representative (politician). He served at least two terms as a burgess in the Virginia House of Burgesses in the 1640s and 1650s representing Isle of Wight County, Virginia.

== Early life ==
George Fawdon was probably born in England about 1600. No definitive information about Fawdon's early life has been found.

The earliest definite official record of George Fawdon's presence in the Virginia colony is from a court in James City, Virginia, on February 8, 1627 (/1628) which ordered "that George Fawdon, Thomas Sawyer & Wassell Weblin shall have leave to goe & live at Warosquoyacke." Warrosquoyacke was one of the several spellings of the area that became Isle of Wight County, Virginia, in 1637. Warwicksqueake is another. On September 29, 1629, Justinian Cooper and wife deeded land there to Wassall Weblin and George Fawdon. Weblin and Fawdon assigned the land to Robert Sabine on February 25, 1630. Because of later grants of land abutting Fawdon's land along the Nansemond River, another grant of land to Fawdon was made but no abstract of the transaction was found in the references.

Several sources state that George Fawdon's daughter, Hester, married John George's son, Isaac. This suggests that Fawdon was married in or about 1630 since Isaac and Hester were married in 1654. Since no record or mention of Fawdon's first wife has been found, direct support for this earlier marriage for Fawdon and for the fact that Isaac George's wife was his daughter can be found only through a gift of land from Fawdon to Isaac George in 1654.

Fawdon's name, variously spelled, appears in several Virginia land patents: Grant to Richard Bennett of 2,000 acres on the Nansemond River adjoining George Fawdon, June 26, 1635; Grant to William Clark of 250 acres of land in Warrosquoyacke County, Virginia, on the south side of Nansemond River, adjoining George Fawder (Fawdon); Grant to Thomas Butler of 1,000 acres of land in Warrosquoyacke County on the Small River, falling into Nansemond Bay, on the back side of land of George Fawdon and John Parrott on July 11, 1635; Grant of 150 acres on the south side of the Nansemond River adjacent to the land of George Fawdon, July 14, 1635.

George Fawdon received a 200-acre patent for land on the south branch of the Elizabeth River adjoining John Yates on June 6, 1639. Viewers of tobacco from Red Point to the head of Pagan Point Creek appointed in 1639-1640 were Joseph Salmon, John Miles and George Fawdon.

George Fawdon and Thomas Carter witnessed a deed from Justinian Cooper to John George on March 16, 1642. On June 10, 1647, George Fawdon, Anthony Jones, and Thomas Wombrell witnessed a deed from James Roche to Henry Pitt in Chuckatuck, Isle of Wight County. George Fawdon, William Underwood and James Taylor, were appointed overseers of the will of Captain John Upton.

== Virginia House of Burgesses, court justice, militia ==
In 1646 and in 1653, George Fawdon represented Isle of Wight County in the Virginia House of Burgesses.

George Fawdon is listed as a justice of the local court in the Isle of Wight County Records for 1646 with eight others including John George. Since no names are listed between 1646 and 1666, George Fawdon may have served on the court during some or all of the years from 1646 until his death in 1654/1655. Fawdon was also listed as County Court Clerk in 1646 with James Bagnall, and in 1653 with five others.

George Fawdon also served as an officer in the local militia. He was listed as "Major" in several records.

== Late life ==
On April 10, 1654, Major George Fawdon gave to Isaac George, son of then Major John George 1,000 acres of land, if he lived to 21, but if he died before then, the land was to return to Major Fawdon. This strongly suggested to Grant family biographer Marty Grant that Hester Fawdon, wife of Isaac George, was the daughter of George Fawdon because there would be little other reason for Fawdon to make such a gift. No record or mention of an earlier wife of George Fawdon has been found, but since Fawdon was married to Anne Smith within a year of his death, she could not have been the mother of Hester Fawdon.

On October 30, 1654, George Fawdon assigned to Mrs. Anne Smith whom he intended to make his wife, 1500 acres of land in the Upper Parish upon the main river beginning at Job Beasley's adjoining the land of that was formerly John Olivers and adjoining land of Richard Corseys. It was further recorded, March 16, 1654/1655: "All of which the jointure and dowry the nuptials now being celebrated, We the said George and Anne Fawdon, do oblige ourselves never to alter without the consent of our father in law Nathaniel Bacon and our mother Ann his wife, with her brother William Smith." On July 9, 1655, Nathaniel Bacon, administrator of the estate of Major George Fawdon, confirmed "unto all points Isaac George the full contents of this gift." This shows Fowden had died by July 9, 1655. Fawdon left no will which might have identified Hester, or other children, and his gift to Isaac George is not easily explained except as a gift to a son-in-law.

== See also ==
- List of members of the Virginia House of Burgesses
