= John George (Virginia colonist) =

Member Virginia House of Burgesses
- In office 1647–1652

Personal details
- Born: c. 1603 England
- Died: 1679 (Aged about 76) Isle of Wight County, Virginia
- Spouse(s): Jane, Ann
- Children: Isaac, Sarah, Rebecca
- Occupation: Planter, Burgess, County Justice, Militia Officer

Military service
- Branch/service: Isle of Wight County, Virginia militia
- Years of service: before 1654–1678
- Rank: Colonel

John George (c. 1603–1679) was an early Virginia colonist, landowner, soldier, county court justice and legislative representative (politician). He served at least two terms as a burgess in the Virginia House of Burgesses in the 1640s and 1650s representing Isle of Wight County, Virginia. Despite his advanced age, as a militia colonel, John George took the field with part of the Isle of Wight County militia in support of Governor Sir William Berkeley and to defend against Native American (Indian) attacks during Bacon's Rebellion.

== Early life, family, settlement ==
John George gave his age as 50 in a 1653 deposition. Therefore, he was born in England, probably in 1603. His wife was named Jane. Although some sources cite circumstantial evidence that her maiden name was Cole, no definitive evidence of her maiden name has been found. John and Jane had three children, Isaac, Sarah and Rebecca. John George had a second wife named Ann but there is no record of when his first wife died and when the second marriage occurred. There is also no record of any children of this second marriage. Several sources state that Hester Fawdon, daughter of George Fawdon, also a member of the House of Burgesses from Isle of Wight County and a militia officer, married John George's son, Isaac.

On November 7, 1634, John George received a patent for 900 acres of land on Bailey Creek, also spelled Bayles Creek, in what was then Charles City County, Virginia but is now Prince George County, Virginia bordering Hopewell, Virginia. The George family moved to Isle of Wight County, Virginia in about 1642. When the George family moved to Isle of Wight County, they lived near Cypress Swamp and Creek and Castle Creek, near the present town of Smithfield, Virginia. Other records show that John George added 350 acres to his property on April 17, 1667.

== Virginia burgess and court justice ==
In 1647 and in 1652, John George was listed as a representative of Isle of Wight County in the Virginia House of Burgesses, the lower house of the colonial Virginia legislature. Since the records show that the 1648 session was a reconvened session of the 1647 assembly and list only two new members, John George likely served in that session. John George is not on the list of burgesses for the 1649 assembly and there is no record for a 1650 assembly. The list of burgesses for the 1651 assembly does not include members from Isle of Wight County so John George's participation in that assembly can not be verified, but he is listed as a member for the first 1652 assembly. Only one member for Isle of Wight County, not John George, is listed for a second assembly in 1652.

John George is listed as a justice of the local court in the Isle of Wight County Records for 1646, 1666, 1667 and 1677. Since no names are listed between 1646 and 1666, John George may have served on the court during some or all of those years.

== Militia and Bacon's Rebellion ==
Isle of Wight County records identify John George as a militia major in 1654, lieutenant colonel in 1666 and colonel in 1677, although the act of March 1676 below identifies John George as a colonel while identifying other officers named in other counties as lieutenant colonels. Since the distinction in the two grades of colonel was recognized in the act, George may have been a full colonel by 1676.

An act of the Virginia General Assembly in March 1676 called out the militia to guard certain locations "against Indians" and authorized Colonel John George or Major James Powell to impress the number of men and horses needed from Isle of Wight County in accordance with the allocations to city and county militias made in the law. Forts were to be built on the frontiers under the law and garrisoned, but only the Governor could order action against the Indians. The colonists who were or felt threatened were not satisfied with this modest, and expensive, action and were wary of the governor who had a thriving trade with the Indians. The action of the governor was ultimately significant in marshalling forces in opposition to Bacon's Rebellion since some historians think the stated reason, despite Indian raids, was mostly a pretext so that forces would be ready to oppose any rebellion.

Colonial Virginia Governor Sir William Berkeley called a new assembly in June, 1676 while Bacon was in the field with volunteers to fight the Indians, and had the forts dismantled. As Bacon's Rebellion took shape, Colonel George sided with Governor Berkeley.

In March 1677, certain residents of Isle of Wight County petitioned the King's Commissioners for Virginia for excuse from having taken up arms in the rebellion. Colonel George and 71 others sent a reply in opposition to this petition with a further defense of the propriety of their own actions during the rebellion. The signers of the original petition fully recanted their support for Bacon in the Court of Isle of Wight County about a month later. John Jennings, clerk of the court of Isle of Wight County, was sentenced to banishment for his support of Bacon. As an elderly and sick man, Jennings asked for a reprieve in order to present an appeal. He was required to "put in good security for his behavior before Col. John George and the Isle of Wight Court." Jennings in fact died later that year. His case had not come up for further hearing.

== Death ==
Despite his advanced age and the risk to his health, Colonel George took the field with part of the Isle of Wight County militia in support of Governor Berkeley and to defend against Native American (Indian) attacks during Bacon's Rebellion, although there is no record that the unit did any fighting. Colonel George did die within the next one to two years. Since John George's will was recorded on January 9, 1679, George Family biographer Marty Grant (Marvin A. Grant Jr.) has concluded that Virginia burgess and militia Colonel John George must have died between August 1678 and January 1679.

== See also ==
- List of members of the Virginia House of Burgesses
