= Robert Beasley (burgess) =

Member Virginia House of Burgesses
- In office 1655–1656

Personal details
- Occupation: Planter, Politician

Robert Beasley was a member of the Virginia House of Burgesses, the elected lower house of the colonial Virginia General Assembly, from Isle of Wight County, in 1655 and 1656.

Upon the petition of Beasley and the other burgesses from Isle of Wight County (Major John Bond and Nicholas Smith), a Commission was established which resulted in Ragged Island and Terascoe Neck being transferred from Nansemond County (then Upper Norfolk County) to Isle of Wight County in 1656.

A descendant of Robert Beasley, Dr. Robert Sanford Beazley (1821–1910), was a member of the Virginia State Convention of 1867–1868, which adopted the Underwood Constitution following the American Civil War. Dr. Beazley also served as a Virginia state senator from Albemarle County and Greene County for four years in 1874–1877.

== See also ==
- House of Burgesses
- List of members of the Virginia House of Burgesses
