= Bernard Moore (burgess) =

American politician (1720–1775)

Member of the Virginia House of Burgesses for King William County
- In office 1761–1765 Serving with Carter Braxton
- Preceded by: Peter Robinson
- Succeeded by: Henry Gaines
- In office 1744–1757 Serving with Francis West, John Martin
- Preceded by: Thomas West
- Succeeded by: Peter Robinson

Personal details
- Born: 1725 King William County, Province of Virginia
- Died: 1775 (aged 49–50) King William County, Virginia, US
- Citizenship: Kingdom of Great Britain
- Spouse: Ann Catherine Spotswood
- Relations: Lucy Moore Robinson (sister)
- Children: 2 daughters, 5 sons including Augustine Moore, Bernard Moore Jr.
- Parent(s): Augustine Moore, Elizabeth Todd Seaton
- Occupation: Planter, militia officer, politician

Colonel Bernard Moore, Esq., of Chelsea, King William County, Virginia (1720–1775), was a prominent landowner and member of the Virginia House of Burgesses representing King William County. His brother-in-law, powerful speaker John Robinson made unauthorized loans to Moore and other allies, discovered after Robinson's death in 1766, which caused his estate's administrator (and future jurist) Edmund Pendleton and creditors including George Washington to auction Moore's land and 55 slaves.

== Early and family life ==
Moore was born to the former Elizabeth Todd Seaton, second wife of Augustine Moore (1685-1743), who had emigrated from England and become a successful merchant, then tobacco planter in the York River watershed in Virginia. The couple probably married in 1714, since Moore's English-born first wife Mary Gage died in childbirth in 1713. His father's family traced their lineage to Lord Mayor of London Sir Thomas More. His maternal grandfather, Thomas Todd (1660-1724) had a plantation in Gloucester County, Toddsbury. This man's first name honors the surname of his maternal grandfather, William Bernard, a merchant and member of the Governor's Council. His mother's first husband, Henry Seaton (1659-1713) had died, leaving land in Spotsylvania County as well as a King William County estate called Romancoke and a "Brick House", to his infant son George Seaton (1711-1750), so Augustine Moore raised him at his Chelsea plantation, together with his own children. Chelsea is near the Mattaponi River in King William County, about six miles upstream from its junction forming the York River at present day West Point.

His father Augustine Moore took care that his children married well, so that his descendants became among the First Families of Virginia. His eldest daughter Elizabeth Moore (1716-1779) may have married first Lyonell Lyde or Lloyd (who died in 1737) before she married Col. James Macon (1721-17680) whose daughters Mary and Elizabeth married Burgesses William Aylett and Bartholomew Dandridge. The couple's first son, named Augustine Moore to honor his grandfather, served as a local justice of the peace but may not have married and died without issue before 1760, when this man and his brother Thomas inherited their late father's land lands pursuant to the terms of his will. Bernard Moore was probably born at Chelsea plantation, though accounts differ as to his birth year between 1718 and 1725. Their sister Lucy (1716- circa 1750) married the widower John Robinson, and bore a son and a daughter before her father's death, although she herself died before 1759, when Speaker Robinson married the heiress Susan Chiswell. Little is known of Bernard's younger brother Thomas Moore, other than that he served as colonel of the local militia and as justice of the peace, married before 1760 (his widow dying in 1801, and their son Thomas Jr. lived to marry), lived at "Moorefield" King William County and conveyed land in Spotsylvania County to this Bernard Moore after their brother Augustine died.

== Personal life ==
Bernard Moore married Ann Catherine Spotswood (1728 – c. 1802), the eldest daughter of Governor Alexander Spotswood and wife Anne Butler Brayne. The couple's firstborn son, John Spotswood Moore, succeeded Carter Braxton in the customs post at West Point and married Ana Katherine Dandridge, but later settled in Goochland County and never held major elective offices. His brother (yet another) Thomas Moore married a woman named Martha and had a daughter named Lucy who married Alexander Rose of King William County, but likewise did not continue the family's political tradition. The third son, Alexander Spotswood Moore (1763-1799), continued the family's military tradition with his revolutionary war service, but likewise did not continue the family's political tradition. His widow Elizabeth Aylett, moved with their children and her new husband Col. Joseph Hamilton to Lexington Kentucky and in 1808 to Blount County Tennesseo before dying in Jefferson County, Tennessee. This couple's youngest two sons carried on the political traditions. Augustine married Sarah Rind and served in the Virginia General Assembly. His brother Bernard Moore married Lucy Ann Hebbard Leiper of Chester County, Pennsylvania, whose father was a medical doctor and whose mother's brother was Maryland Governor William Smallwood. and the youngest brother, Alexander Spotswood Moore (1763-1799), after patriotic military service in 1787 married Elizabeth, the daughter of Col. William Aylett. Their sister Elizabeth Moore Walker (1746-1809) married Dr. John Walker of Albemarle County, Virginia, who also died in 1809. Her sister Ann Butler Moore Carter (1753-1809) married Burgess Charles Hill Carter of Shirley Plantation and their daughter Ann Hill Carter (1771- ) became the second wife of Gen. Henry Lee and the mother of General Robert E. Lee. The youngest daughter, Lucy Moore, married Rev. Henry Skyren who had emigrate from England and served at historic St. John's Church in King William County, then at Elizabeth City.

== Career ==
When his father died in 1743, Bernard Moore inherited land and slaves in King William, King and Queen, Spotsylvania and New Kent Counties. To purchase additional slaves to farm this land, Moore borrowed money from fellow planters, including Daniel Parke Custis and William Claiborne. In 1761 Moore sought to acquire an iron forge, and borrowed money from his brother-in-law John Robinson, who was speaker of the House of Burgesses and one of the representatives from King and Queen County. When Robinson died unexpectedly in May 1766, he proved heavily indebted. Furthermore, the administrator of his estate (Edmund Pendleton) discovered that Robinson had not destroyed old Virginia currency as authorized by law, but instead loaned it out to political allies (in effect embezzling circa £110,000 from the Virginia treasury), and Pendleton sought to recover those funds to repay Robinson's creditors. The largest loans went to William Byrd, but Bernard Moore owed the second highest amount (£8,500).

Voters in New Kent County first elected Bernard Moore as one of their representatives in the House of Burgesses in 1744, since Thomas West died, and re-elected him until 1758, when Peter Robinson succeeded to that part-time position. However, Moore again won election in 1761, only to be replaced again in 1766, this time by Henry Gaines, who died before the session, but was replaced by Thomas Claiborne. Either Bernard Moore or his son of the same name, again won election in 1769, despite the debate about Robinson's improprieties. In the last session of the House of Burgesses, this man's son Augustine Moore replaced Phillip Whitehead Claiborne, who had died before taking office.

== Death and legacy ==
Bernard Moore died in 1775, after his son Augustine Moore had begun to follow his career path. Although the three men named Augustine Moore in the 1787 Virginia Tax census lived in counties southeast of Bernard Moore's former lands, his brother Thomas Moore and his wife Joanna owned 15 adult slaves and 13 enslaved children in King William County in that census, and his son Bernard Moore owned 39 adult slaves and 58 enslaved children, as well as 8 horses, 87 cattle and a chariot. Bernard Moore Jr. also followed his father's career path as a politician, and was elected in 1782 to represent King William County in the Virginia House of Delegates. Although the younger Moore did not win re-election in the next session, he again served as one of King William County's delegates in 1786 and was re-elected twice to one year terms. Furthermore, his stepbrother George Seaton's grandson William Winston Seaton became an influential publisher and mayor of the new federal city, Washington, D.C.

Much of his Chelsea plantation remains today, listed on the National Register of Historic Places and subject to preservation easements.
