= Thomas Fowke (burgess) =

Merchant and politician of The Colony of Virginia

Member of the House of Burgesses for Westmoreland County
- In office 1660-March 1662
- Preceded by: John Holland
- Succeeded by: Gerrard Fowke

Member of the House of Burgesses for James City County
- In office 1659
- Preceded by: Thomas Loveinge
- Succeeded by: Robert Ellison

Personal details
- Born: England
- Died: circa 1663; London, England
- Relatives: Gerrard Fowke(brother)

Thomas Foulke or Fowke (died 1663) was an English merchant who became a planter, military officer and politician in the Colony of Virginia. He represented James City County and later Westmoreland County in the House of Burgesses after he and his brother and business partner Gerrard Fowke bought property in the Northern Neck of Virginia.

== Early and family life ==
Born before 1630 at Gunston Hall in Staffordshire, England, to the former Mary Bayley of Lee Hall in Staffordshire and her husband Roger Fowke (1598-1649). He had two brothers who also emigrated across the Atlantic Ocean during the English Civil War. Richard Fowke outlived his brothers, dying in 1677 after settling in Maryland. Gerrard Fowke (d. 1669) initially partnered with his brother and settled in Westmoreland County, but after this man's death moved to Charles County, Maryland.

== Career ==
During the Virginia tobacco boom, in June 1654, Thomas Fowke patented 3,350 acres on Potomac Creek in newly created Westmoreland County, and by 1659 he also patented some land on the south side of the Potomac River near Chappawamsick Creak. His brother Gerrard Fowke lived nearby, and in 1658 was appointed to settle a dispute between trader Giles Brent and some Doeg Native Americans, whom Brent accused of killing his cattle, which they denied. Although Capt. Brent accepted wampum and beaverskins, he wrote to Gerrard Fowke urging the end of the peace treaty between that tribe and the colonial government. In May 1660, Thomas Fowke signed a partnership agreement with his brother Gerrard, which merged their real and personal estates for seven years, during which time he made his will (in 1660 before traveling to England and testifying in two cases, one about a maritime insurance claim and another about tobacco shipped from Virginia).

In 1659, the year in which he was identified as "Captain" Thomas Foulke, James City County voters unseated all four incumbents and selected this man and three other planters to represent them in the House of Burgesses. The following year Westmoreland County voters elected him to represent recently created Westmoreland County.

== Death and legacy ==
Fowke died without issue, possibly in England. On June 24, 1663, his brother presented this man's will, which was admitted to probate by the Westmoreland County Court, with Gerrard being appointed executor of the estate.
