= Thomas Allonby =

American statesman and landowner

Thomas Allonby, sometimes spelled Allonby, was a prominent colonial landowner and member of the Virginia House of Burgesses. Allonby served in three sessions of the House of Burgesses representing the Elizabeth City constituency, including in 1684, 1688, and from 1691-1692. He was succeeded by William Armistead. Allonby was a slaveowner.
