= Ralph Justice =

American politician

Ralph Justice was a member of the House of Burgesses in 1754 and the representative of Accomack County.
