= William Allen (burgess, 1629) =

Member of the Virginia House of Burgesses representing Henry Throgmorton's plantation
- In office 1629

Personal details
- Born: circa 1600 England
- Died: circa 1630 Throgmorton's plantationy, Colony of Virginia
- Profession: farmer

William Allen (circa 1600-circa 1630), emigrated from England to the Virginia colony in 1624, probably as an indentured servant, and survived to farm as well as represent Throgmorton's Plantation in the Virginia House of Burgesses in its 1629 session.

Among eight single young men who emigrated to the Virginia colony aboard the Southampton in 1623, Allen's passage was probably paid by the Virginia Company of London or private individuals following the colony's decimation in the Indian Massacre of 1622. Allen initially lived in Elizabeth City County, but soon moved to Flowerdew Hundred, and the muster listed him as a servant of Abraham Peirsey (a shareholder of the Virginia Company, who never served in the colony's legislature).

Five years later, Allen lived on the north side of the James River and represented Henry Throgmorton's plantation at Shirley Hundred in the assembly of the House of Burgesses that convened on October 16, 1629. Henry Throgmorton was a London merchant who probably never visited the colony, and that was the only year of that constituency. Other men (in that, preceding and subsequent years) represented nearby Flowerdew Hundred Plantation (which Peirsey owned on the south side of the James River), Shirley Hundred Island in the James Rier and Shirley Hundred, as well as other plantations.

Because of the high mortality of the era, Allen likely died shortly thereafter and is not the merchant of the same name in Charles River County (later York County) a decade later. A later British emigrant (during the tobacco boom of the 1640s and 1650s) married the daughter of James City County merchant and sometime burgess Robert Holt, and developed plantations in New Kent County. This William Allen is probably not related to other man of the same name who served in the Virginia General Assembly in the 19th century, mostly representing Surry County on the south side of the James River, who are descended from Arthur Allen who emigrated in the 1640s and served in the House of Burgesses beginning in 1684, since that man's father shared the same name and his grandfather was John Allen.
