= John Lee (Essex burgess) =

Virginia colony tobacco planter (1724–1767)

Member of the Virginia House of Burgesses representing Essex County
- In office 1761–1768 Serving with John Upshaw, Francis Waring
- Preceded by: Francis Waring
- Succeeded by: William Roane

Personal details
- Born: ca. 1724 Lee Hall, Westmoreland County, Colony of Virginia
- Died: 1767 (aged 42–43) "Cabin Point", Westmoreland County, Colony of Virginia
- Spouse: Mary Smith Ball
- Relations: Richard "Squire" Lee (brother); Richard Lee II(grandfather)
- Parent(s): Henry Lee I and Mary Bland
- Occupation: planter, clerk, legislator

John Lee (1724 – 1767), was a planter, clerk and legislator from the Lee family of Virginia. The eldest son of Henry Lee I settled in Essex County and served as the county clerk (1745-1761) before twice winning election as one of that county's representatives in the House of Burgesses. He married in 1749 and returned to his native Westmoreland County years before his death.
