= Peregrine Bland =

English colonist in Virginia (c. 1590 - c. 1654)

Member of the Virginia House of Burgesses representing Charles River Shire
- In office 1640 Serving with Hugh Gwyn, William (Pryor)
- Preceded by: position created
- Succeeded by: Richard Townsend

Personal details
- Born: 1596
- Died: c. 1647 (aged 50–51)

Peregrine Bland (c.1596 – June 11, 1647) was an early settler of the Colony of Virginia and a member of the Virginia House of Burgesses.

== Early life in England ==
Bland was born in England and entered Emmanuel College on February 26, 1613.

== Virginia colonist and politician ==
In about 1635 he was transported to Virginia. He was elected a Burgess to represent Charles River County for the 1639 to 1640 term.

In 1642 Bland was granted 1,000 acres of land in the Deltaville area of Virginia. Bland Point is named after him.

== Death ==
On June 10, 1647, Bland, along with Francis Yeardley, the son of former Virginia governor George Yeardley, Dr. Edward Hall, and current Burgess Richard Eyers, spent the night at the widow Sarah Gookin's estate. Francis Yeardley described the incident that took place the next morning at breakfast. He stated that they "fedd hartily," and recorded that they "healthfully and cheerfully" passed the morning. During the conversation, Eyers and Bland realized that they were related. They drank alcoholic beverages freely and after breakfast Yeardley, Dr. Hall, Bland, and Eyers decided to set out for Eyers' plantation by foot. Although Yeardley suggested waiting until the heat of the day had subsided, Bland decided not to heed the warning and set briskly for the plantation.

Eyers quickly realized that he did not know how to get there and asked Edward Windham for directions. Windham led them as far as Little Creek. A bit beyond there they saw Bland sleeping in the shade of Mrs. Gookin's "barne fort." Bland asked Eyers to wait with him for he needed to rest and suggested that the others continue. Eyers joined Bland on the ground and both napped feet to feet. Only about a half-hour later, when Eyers awoke, he found Bland dead, having suffocated in his own vomit. Bland died, as one of the participants of this incident said, while "purging at the mouth bloody froth."

The coroner's inquest was held the next day on June 12, 1647, in Lower Norfolk County, Virginia. His death was attributed to natural causes.

Bland's will was proved on January 19, 1650. He is known to have had one daughter, Hope Bland (c. 1630 - 1687), who is said to have married a William R. Beaumont.
