= Gerrard Fowke =

Merchant and politician of The Colony of Virginia

Member of the Maryland Assembly for Charles County
- In office 1666

Member of the House of Burgesses for Westmoreland County
- In office 1663-1665
- Preceded by: Thomas Fowke
- Succeeded by: John Washington

Personal details
- Born: 1626 Brewood, Staffordshire, England
- Died: October 15, 1669 (aged 42–43) Port Tobacco, Charles County, Maryland
- Spouse: Ann Thorogood Chandler
- Children: Roger, Adam and Gerrard Fowke Jr., Mary Fowke Mason, Elizabeth Fowke Dent
- Relatives: Thomas Fowke (brother)

Gerrard Foulke or Fowke (1626 – October 15, 1669) was an English merchant who became a planter, military officer and politician in the Colony of Virginia, then the Maryland Colony. He succeeded his brother and business partner Thomas Fowke and represented Westmoreland County in the House of Burgesses, before marrying a widow, moving to Port Tobacco and representing Charles County in the Maryland Assembly.

== Early and family life ==
Born in 1626 in Staffordshire, England, to the former Mary Bayley of Lee Hall in Staffordshire and her husband Roger Fowke (1598-1649). A Royalist, he and two brothers emigrated across the Atlantic Ocean during the English Civil War. Capt. Thomas Fowke (d. 1663) initially partnered with his brother and traveled between England and the colonies.Richard Fowke outlived both his brothers, dying in 1677 after settling in Maryland near this brother.

== Career ==
In April 1655, Fowke, who identified himself as a merchant and lived on Potomac Creek, was appointed a justice of the peace for Westmoreland County (the justices jointly administering the county at the time). He was named lieutenant Colonel of the county militia in 1661.

Meanwhile, in June 1654, Thomas Fowke patented 3,350 acres on Potomac Creek in newly created Westmoreland County, and over the next decade, he and partners patented thousands of acres on what was called Virginia's Northern Neck. In 1656, Fowke served as an attorney representing London merchant Thomas Rowse. In March 1658, Fowke and Henry Corbin patented 3,000 acres, then laid claim to 3650 acres on Potomac Creek and 1680 acres on the Rappahannock River in what became Stafford County near the town of the Doeg Native Americans.

In 1658 Fowke was appointed to settle a dispute between trader Giles Brent and some Doeg Native Americans, whom Brent accused of killing his cattle, which they denied. Although Capt. Brent accepted wampum and beaverskins, he wrote Fowke urging the end of the peace treaty between that tribe and the colonial government. In May 1660, Thomas Fowke signed a partnership agreement with his brother Gerrard, which merged their real and personal estates for seven years, during which time he made his will and died, leaving 2/3 of his estate to Gerrard, who was appointed executor.

In 1660 several settlers were murdered by Indians. The werowance of the Patowomack tribe, Wahananoche (or Wahanganoche), turned over the culprit to Fowke, but the native soon escaped. Fowke, together with fellow justices Capt. George Mason I and John Lord then charged Wahananoche with treason, seized him and shipped him to the capital. There a commission found no wrongdoing on the werowance's part but misconduct by this man, as well as by Captain Giles Brent and Lord. Those three were ordered to pay 200 arms length of wampum and 200 arms length of duffel matchcoat cloth to the werowance, and the four colonials were fined 34,000 pounds of tobacco and banned from civil and military offices (although that ban was ignored). However, the werowance died soon after returning from the capital, and his tribesmen had left Westmoreland County. By 1673 the Doegs were living near the headwaters of Passapatanzy Creek, just west of modern Dogue, and from 1714 to 1720 were mentioned as living on the upper reaches of the Mattaponi River. Meanwhile, Fowke acquired the land which had underlain their village, and built a house he called Gunston Hall after the family's residence in Staffordshire, but soon sold it to the Mason Family.

In 1663 and 1665 Westmoreland County voters elected Fowke to replace his brother Thomas in the House of Burgesses.

According to Tyler, Fowke moved across the Potomac River, to Port Tobacco, Maryland, after marrying the widow of Col. Job Chandler of Port Tobacco.

== Personal life ==
Fowke married this first wife, who died. In 1661 he married Anne Thorogood (1630-1704), formerly of Lower Norfolk County, daughter of immigrant and burgess Adam Thorogood. She had two sons, William and Richard Chandler by Her first husband, Capt. Job Chandler, who had received headrights for importing 6 people into the county. Though he had used them to patent land in Lower Norfolk County, he moved to Maryland because of his friendship with Capt. William Stone, who had become that colony's governor, and not only defended Lord Baltimore's claims but sat in that province's upper house before his death in 1659/60. Anne Fowke bore another son, Gerrard Fowke Jr. who survived to adulthood, as did daughters Mary and Elizabeth from this second marriage. His daughter Mary married George Mason II and thus was the grandmother of founding father George Mason. and Elizabeth married William Dent who was became that province's attorney general and speaker of the lower house of the Maryland Assembly (after practicing his profession as well as those of planter and merchant.

== Death and legacy ==
When Fowke died, his widow was appointed to administer his estate, and she survived for decades. His will confirmed transfer of an enslaved Negro girl from her grandmother to his daughters. His namesake son also served in the Maryland Assembly. The Fowke family continued in the Potomac River basin and maintained a close relationship with the Mason family, who also owned land on both sides of the Potomac River.
