= Francis West (colonel) =

American politician

Member of the Virginia House of Burgesses for King William County
- In office 1756–1758 Serving with Bernard Moore
- Preceded by: John Martin
- Succeeded by: Peter Robinson
- In office 1748–1749 Serving with Bernard Moore
- Preceded by: James Power
- Succeeded by: John Martin

Personal details
- Born: 1711 King William County, Colony of Virginia
- Died: June 28, 1796 (aged 84–85)
- Occupation: planter, militia officer, politician

Military service
- Battles/wars: French and Indian War

Colonel Francis West (1711 – June 28, 1796) was a Virginia planter and at times the Sheriff of King William County in the Colony and Dominion of Virginia and twice represented the same county in the House of Burgesses, the colony's representative assembly.

West was born in King William County, the son of Captain Thomas West and Agnes, both descended from the First Families of Virginia. West was the county Sheriff in 1741. He twice served single terms in the House of Burgesses between 1748–1758. West also served in the Colonial Defense forces during the French and Indian War.

West was married twice. His first wife was Susannah Littlepage. Francis West married his second wife, Jane Cole, after the death of her second husband Stephen Bingham in 1759.

He died in Fairfax County, Virginia.
