= Samuel Hayward =

American politician

Member of the Virginia House of Delegates from the Stafford County district
- In office 1685–1686
- Preceded by: George Mason
- Succeeded by: George Brent

7th Sheriff of Stafford County, Virginia
- In office 1685–1687
- Preceded by: Edward Thomason
- Succeeded by: Malachy Peale

Personal details
- Born: c. 1641 England
- Died: c. 1696 British Virginia
- Spouse: Martha Washington
- Relations: Lawrence Washington (father-in-law)
- Children: 1
- Occupation: Planter, politician

Samuel Hayward was an English immigrant to America and a member of the Virginia House of Burgesses.

== Early life and family ==
Hayward was born in England around 1641 and christened in 1675 at St Michael's Church, in Macclesfield. He emigrated to Virginia in around 1675. His father, Nicholas Hayward was a Virginia merchant and notary public in London.

== Career ==
In the mid 1680s, Hayward was sheriff of Stafford County, Virginia and clerk of the county courts. He served as a member of the House of Burgesses for Stafford County from 1685 to 1686. Hayward had significant land grant holdings (7,500 acres) as part of the Brent Town Tract of James II of England, located near present-day Nokesville and Bristow. Hayward is also listed as an executor on multiple Virginia estates.

== Personal life ==
In the 1670s he was married to Martha Washington, daughter of Lawrence Washington and sister of John Washington. Hayward died around 1696.
