= Samuel Sharpe (burgess) =

Colonist from Virginia; burgess

Member Virginia House of Burgesses
- In office 1619–1623/24

Personal details
- Born: England
- Died: unknown
- Spouse: Elizabeth
- Occupation: Ancient planter, Burgess

Samuel Sharpe, sometimes referred to as Samuel Sharp or "Ssamuel" was an early Virginia colonist who settled in the area that became Charles City County, Virginia. He came to Virginia in 1610 with most of the passengers and crew of the Sea Venture as they made their way to the colony after 10 months in Bermuda. They had wrecked in a storm there and built two small boats to complete their journey to Jamestown. Along with Samuel Jordan, he represented Charles City as a burgess in the first general assembly of the Virginia House of Burgesses in Jamestown, Virginia in 1619. He was a representative for Westover, an incorporation of Charles City, in the 1623/24 assembly and signed a letter along with several burgesses at the time of that assembly.

Sharpe and his wife, Elizabeth, survived the Indian massacre of 1622. He became a landowner and planter. His life and fate after he returned to England, presumably temporarily, on business in 1626 is unknown.

Samuel Sharpe should not be confused with William Sharpe (Sergeant Sharp(e)), another early Virginia colonist and member of the House of Burgesses in 1629 with whom he is sometimes erroneously conflated.

== On the Sea Venture and Bermuda ==
Sharpe was among the passengers who were cast away on Bermuda when the Sea Venture was shipwrecked there on its way to the Colony of Virginia with additional supplies, colonists and the new governor, Sir Thomas Gates in 1609. On Bermuda, Sharpe, along with Humphrey (or Humfrey) Reed (or Reade), reported the proposed mutiny of Stephen Hopkins, later a passenger on the Mayflower to Plymouth Colony, to Governor Gates, one of the shipwrecked passengers. Hopkins believed the wreck ended the authority of the ship's captain, Captain Christopher Newport and the accompanying Sir George Somers, admiral of the Virginia Company of London. He also thought that Gates had no authority until the passengers reached Jamestown. Hopkins wanted to stay on Bermuda where food was available rather than continue to Virginia where he, and others, believed scarcity and danger awaited. Sharpe and Reed testified before an assembly of passengers to what Hopkins had told them about his plans. Although Gates sentenced Hopkins to be executed, he acceded to the requests of Newport and writer and later Secretary of the Colony William Strachey to pardon Hopkins. The passengers and crew of the Sea Venture built two small ships, the Patience and the Deliverance and ultimately arrived at Jamestown on May 24, 1610.

== Burgess ==
In 1619, Samuel Sharpe represented Charles City (sometimes referred to as Bermuda City) at the first assembly of the Virginia House of Burgesses.

McIlwaine, H. R., ed. Volume 1 of Journals of the House of Burgesses, 1619 - 1658/59. Richmond, VA, 1915, p. viii shows Sharpe as the representative for Westover, an incorporation of Charles City in the 1623/24 assembly. (Note: In Stanard 1902, p. 52, Wirt, 1894, p. 60 and Grizzard, Frank E. and Dennis Boyd Smith. Jamestown Colony: A Political, Social and Cultural History. Santa Barbara, CA: ABC-CLIO, 2007. ISBN 978-1-85109-637-4. p. 419, Samuel Sharpe (not shown as "Sergeant") is listed as a burgess in the 1619 general assembly for Charles City. He signed the letter of burgesses replying to Alderman Robert Johnson in 1624, as shown by McCartney, 2007, p. 631. His name is not shown by Stanard in the list of burgesses for the 1624 session but he is listed as the representative for Westover, an incorporation of Charles City, in the 1623/24 session by McIlwane as cited in the text.)

== Elizabeth Sharpe ==
Elizabeth Sharpe, the wife of Samuel Sharpe, arrived in Virginia on the Margaret and John in 1621. She is known to have been living with Samuel at Flowerdew Hundred at the census date of January 20, 1625. She should not be confused with the wife of William Sharpe, also named Elizabeth.

== Indian massacre of 1622 and aftermath ==
On March 22, 1622, Chief Opchanacanough and warriors of his Powhatan Confederacy attacked the Virginia colonists, killing at least 347 people, a quarter of the population of the Virginia colony, in the Indian massacre of 1622. Samuel Sharpe helped inventory the estate of George Thorpe of Berkeley Hundred who had been killed during the attack. Thorpe was a deputy to the then governor, George Yeardley. (Note: Thorpe was a "deputy for the college lands." He had sympathy for the Native Americans and as deputy to Governor Yeardley allowed them access to the colonists' villages. He disciplined subordinates who gave them offense. He tried to convince Opechancanough to send Powhatan boys to receive an English education in the colony. Despite Thorpe's trust and hope that the Powhatans would convert to Christianity, Opechancanough carried out the fatal attack in which Thorpe and many other colonists were killed and Thorpe's corpse was desecrated. Price, David A. Love & Hate in Jamestown: John Smith, Pocahontas and the Start of a New Nation. New York: Vintage Books, a Division of Random House, Inc., 2003. ISBN 978-1-4000-3172-6. pp. 201-208. McCartney, 2007, p. 693.)

After the 1622 attack, the Virginia colony continued to suffer from inadequate diet due to the loss of many men before the 1622 planting season, disease and further Native American raids, which resulted in men being diverted from work in the fields to guard duty. Sharpe sent a letter back to England in March or April 1623, according to David A. Price, on March 24, 1622 according to Martha W. McCartney, in which he wrote: "To write of all crosses and miseries which have befallen us at ths time we are not able: The Lord hath crossed us by stricking most of us with sickness and death." Sharpe noted that the sickness and death in the colony made it difficult for anyone to plant crops or conduct business. He declared that most of the men who arrived on the Abigail had died, including George Paul, whose help he had sought from Governor Yeardley. On the other hand, in 1624, Sharpe and other burgesses signed a rebuttal to Alderman [Robert] Johnson's statement that in contrast to the current dire state of the Virginia colony, the conditions in the colony were good before 1619.

== Wife and property ==
Records showed that Sharpe and his wife Elizabeth were living at Flowerdew Hundred Plantation on February 16, 1624 and were still there on January 20, 1625. In a list of patented land sent to England in 1625, Sharpe was shown with 100 acres on the Appomattox River. In 1625, Sharpe and merchant Edward Blaney (burgess), a burgess for James City in 1623 and 1624, disagreed about ownership of some cattle. Some residents claimed that some of Blaney's cattle belonged to the Virginia Company. Late in 1625, Richard Biggs of West and Shirley Hundred, later Shirley Plantation, named Sharpe as overseer of his estate.

== Business trip to England ==
Sharpe returned to England on the Temperance in 1626 to attend to the presentation of Bigg's estate for probate. In July 1626, having been identified as a gentleman, Sharpe and others testified that their goods and tobacco had been wrongfully detained at Cowes on the Isle of Wight, England because of a dispute between the ship's master of the Temperance' and its owner.

== Further life unknown ==
A burgess identified as "Sergeant Sharp" (no first name, no "e" at the end of the name) is listed as a burgess for the "Neck of Land" for the 1629 session in both Stanard and Hening. "Sergeant Sharp" was "William G. Sharpe (Sharp)", also of Charles City, and a burgess in the 1629 list for the Neck of Land. Lyon Gardiner Tyler, has a brief biographical paragraph concerning "Samuel Sharpe" which identifies him as a burgess for Charles City in the 1619 session and the Neck of Land in the October 1625 session. A 1625 session, called a "convention," is not shown in Stanard or Henings or the McCartney Sharpe (Sharp) entries but is mentioned in Grizzard. McIlwane lists neither Samuel Sharpe nor William Sharpe as members of the 1625 convention.

Tyler gives no further information about Sharpe after 1625. Based on McCartney which has no information about Samuel Sharpe after 1626, and Grizzard which shows the members of the First General Assembly and their fates if known and which indicates that Samuel Sharpe's fate is unknown, Samuel Sharpe was not the "Sergeant Sharp" of the 1629 assembly. That burgess was William Sharpe (Sharp), as stated by McCartney with citations. Also, Lists of the Livinge & the Dead in Virginia, compiled February 16, 1623, shows "Serjeant William Sharpe" residing at the Neck of Land.

None of the references found for this page give further information about Samuel Sharpe after 1626 such as whether or when he returned to Virginia and his date of death.

== See also ==
- List of members of the Virginia House of Burgesses
