= Robert Savin =

American politician

Member Virginia House of Burgesses
- In office 1629–1630

Personal details
- Occupation: Planter, Politician

Robert Savin was a member of the Virginia House of Burgesses, the elected lower house of the colonial Virginia General Assembly, from "Warrosquoyacke County," later Isle of Wight County, in the assemblies of 1629 and 1629–1630.

The area represented by Savin originally was known as Lawne's Plantation. The colonists also had named the area "Warresqueak County" or "Warrosquoyack County" after the Native American tribe who lived there. Stanard shows the spelling of the county for which Savin was a member as "Warrosquoyacke County."

Stanard shows four members from Warrosquoyacke County in the assemblies of 1629, convening October 16, 1629, and of 1629–1630, convening March 24, 1630 but only one member from "Warrosqueake" County in the assembly of 1631–1632.

In 1620, a movement began to change the name of "Warresqueak County" to "Isle of Wight County" but this was not done until 1637.
