= Roger Delk =

Politician in the Colony of Virginia

Roger Delk (also spelled Dilke, Delke, or Dilk) (died before 1635) was a representative for Stanley's Hundred in the House of Burgesses.

Born in England, Delk married his first wife Sarah there shortly before setting out for the Virginia Colony. Delk's wife bore a daughter, Elizabeth born April 1622 in Middlesex, London. Delk traveled from England to Virginia aboard the ship "Southampton" in 1624. This ship had been one of Sir Walter Raleigh's ships used on his last expedition to South America. It is likely that his wife was to follow him later, but most likely died before. In any case, shortly after his arrival in the colony, he married Alice Davenport who had arrived on the same boat as he did.

Roger was indentured to John Chew and employed in 1624 on his plantation on Hog Island. He worked out his indenture by 1626, for he had relocated Jamestown by 18 September 1626, and in 1628 Francis West, "Governor and Captaine Generall", granted him 1,000 acres (4 km^{2}) on Lawne's Creek which flows into the James River just below Hog Island. The size of this patent suggests the possibility of some influence having been exerted in his behalf.

In a court session held at James Citye (Jamestown on 7 May 1627, it was ruled that Roger Dilk (by his own confession) had absented himself from his plantation without the knowledge or leave of his commander contrary to an order of Court for the space of 8 days complete, and he was fined to pay 25 pounds of tobacco for every 24 hours he was absent, totaling the sum of 200 pounds of tobacco.

Despite this he rose rapidly in esteem and was chosen to represent "Stanley Hundred" (Warwick) in the February 1633 session of the House of Burgesses, the first legislative assembly in North America.

He served during the 1 February 1632 – 1633 session and may have lived too high above his means in Jamestown, while attending the assembly in 1634 for he was outlawed for debts and a capias was issued against him.

He appears to have died before 1635 as Alice his wife patented land in that year on Lawnes Creek in her own name. He had one child, a son Roger II (born 1634).
