= Hugh Gwyn =

English colonist in Virginia (c. 1590 - c. 1654)

Member of the Virginia House of Burgesses representing Gloucester County
- In office 1652 Serving with Francis Willis
- Preceded by: position created
- Succeeded by: Richard Pate

Member of the Virginia House of Burgesses representing York County
- In office 1646
- Preceded by: Rowland Burnham
- Succeeded by: Richard Lee I

Member of the Virginia House of Burgesses representing Charles River Shire
- In office 1640 Serving with Peregrine Bland, William [Pryor]
- Preceded by: position created
- Succeeded by: George Ludlowe

Personal details
- Born: 1590
- Died: c. 1654 (aged 63–64)

Hugh Gwyn (c. 1590 – c. 1654) was an Englishman who settled in the Virginia colony. Gwyn served several terms in the Virginia House of Burgesses (representing the same area, but as different counties were created) and also held local offices. Gwynn's Island is named for him, and family members have lived there since. Spelling varying in that era and between Wales and England, multiple persons named "Hugh Gwyn" or "Hugh Wynne" lived in the Virginia Colony in the 1600s.

== Early life and emigration ==
Hugh Gwyn (sometimes spelled "Wynne", "Wing", or "Gwinne") likely immigrated to Jamestown with the 1608 second supply. A Hugh Gwynn, possibly a separate person, sailed to the colony in the George c. 1620 as a servant to Captain William Peirce. This two men may be the same person, or different people.

Gwyn claimed to discover Gwynn's Island in c. 1611. According to legend, Gwynn saved Pocahontas from a sinking canoe near the island.

At a January 1624 muster, a Hugh Wing [sic] was listed as aged 30 years. Either this person immigrated in 1608 at the age of fourteen, or immigrated in 1620.

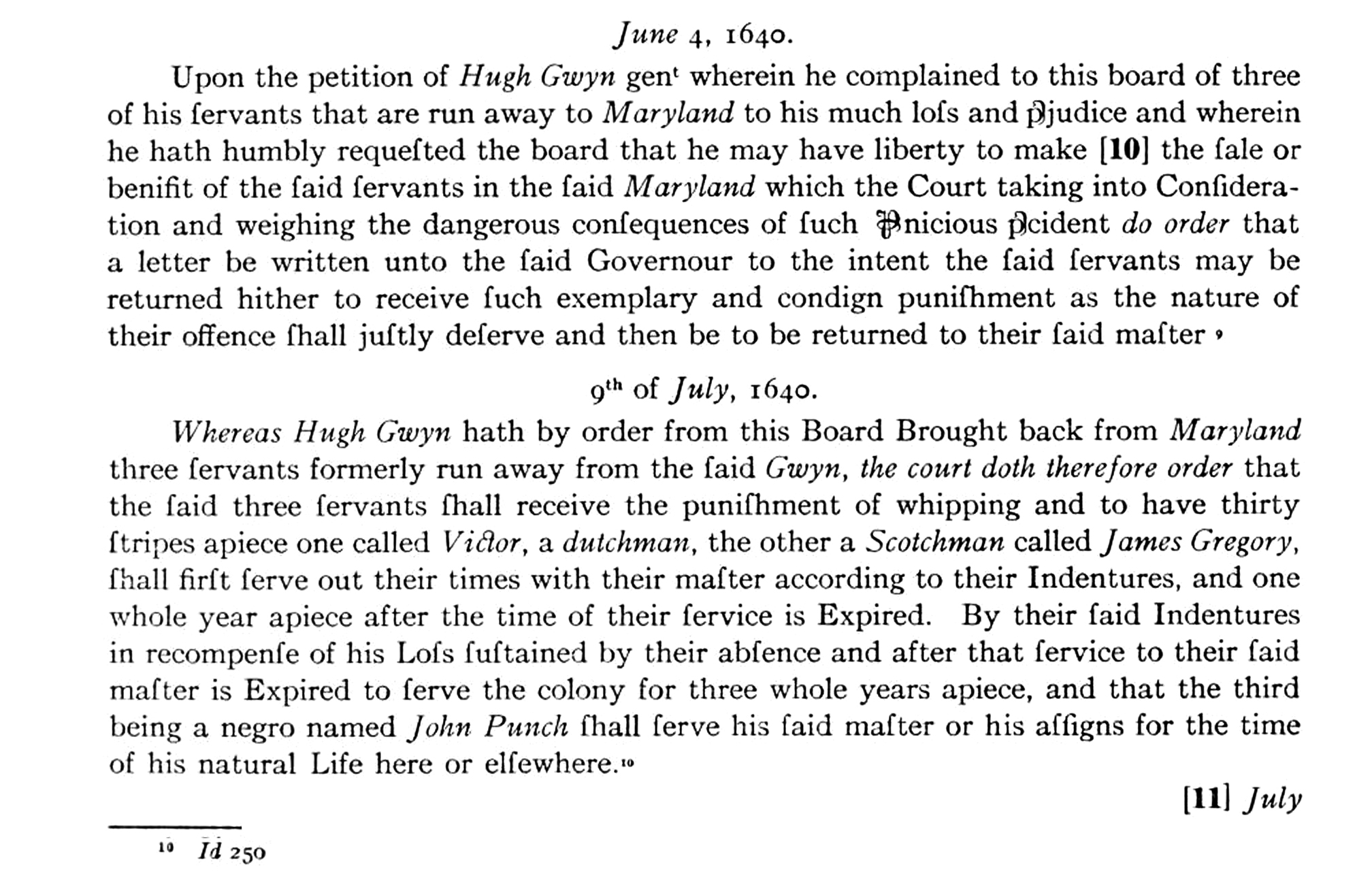
Minutes of Council of Virginia, June and July 1640

In 1635, Gwyn petitioned King Charles I for ownership of the island and in 1640 was given 1,000 acres (4.0 km^{2}). Gwyn built a log cabin and named the area "Gwynnville" [sic].

By December 1635, Gwynn had patented 1000 acres of land on the Piankatank River (a tributary of the York River) in what was then Charles River Shire, but which in his lifetime became York County, then Gloucester County and after the Revolutionary War (more than a century after his death), Mathews County, Virginia). He expanded his acreage by 1700 acres in 1642, based on headrights (persons he had financially helped emigrate) including Mrs. Ann Gwynn and Christopher and Eliza Higginson. In 1652 he patented land close to Milford Haven Creek, and also owned land in Stafford County (in the Northern Neck of Virginia) that his son John would sell in 1689.

Charles River Shire voters elected Gwynn, Peregrine Bland and probably William [Pryor] to represent them (part-time) in the Virginia House of Burgesses for the 1640 session, but elected three other men (George Ludlowe, Richard Townsend and George Worleigh) for the 1642 session, all of whom signed a Declaration against the Virginia Company. Five years later, after that shire was reconstituted as York County, its voters elected Gwynn and William Luddington as their representatives in the 1646 session, but again re-elected neither man. Gwynn also served as justice of the peace for York County beginning in 1641 (the justices jointly governing counties in that era). When Gloucester County was created from the increasingly settled area of York County north of the York River (including Gwynne's Island), its voters elected Gwyn and Francis Willis as their representatives to both 1652 legislative sessions, but re-elected neither man.

In 1640, three of Gwynn's indentured servants--John Punch ("a negro"), Victor ("a Dutchman"), and James Gregory ("a Scotchman") fled their master but were captured and returned to Gwyn. Although Gwynn proposed to sell them all in Maryland, the General Court of Virginia ruled that all three be whipped, but Punch would be Gwyn's slave for life as punishment for escaping.

== Death and legacy ==
Gwyn died by 1654, when Elizabeth Gwynn patented 700 acres in Isle of Wight County (once represented by Capt. William Peirce, but south of the James River) as executrix for Hugh Gwyn, who had patented that land in 1640. A century ago, genealogists disagreed as to whether Colonel Hugh Gwynn of Gloucester County was this man's son or the son of Sir Owen Wynn. Rev. John Gwynn was the rector of Ware Parish Church, which included Gloucester County, but arrived in the colony during the Crowmwell era. A later legislator, David Gwyn, was elected to the House of Burgesses representing Richmond County in the Northern Neck of Virginia in 1703, but died before the session opened.

== See also ==
- Robert Wynne (Virginia politician)
