= Chelsea (West Point, Virginia) =

Historic house in Virginia, United States

- U.S. National Register of Historic Places
- Virginia Landmarks Register
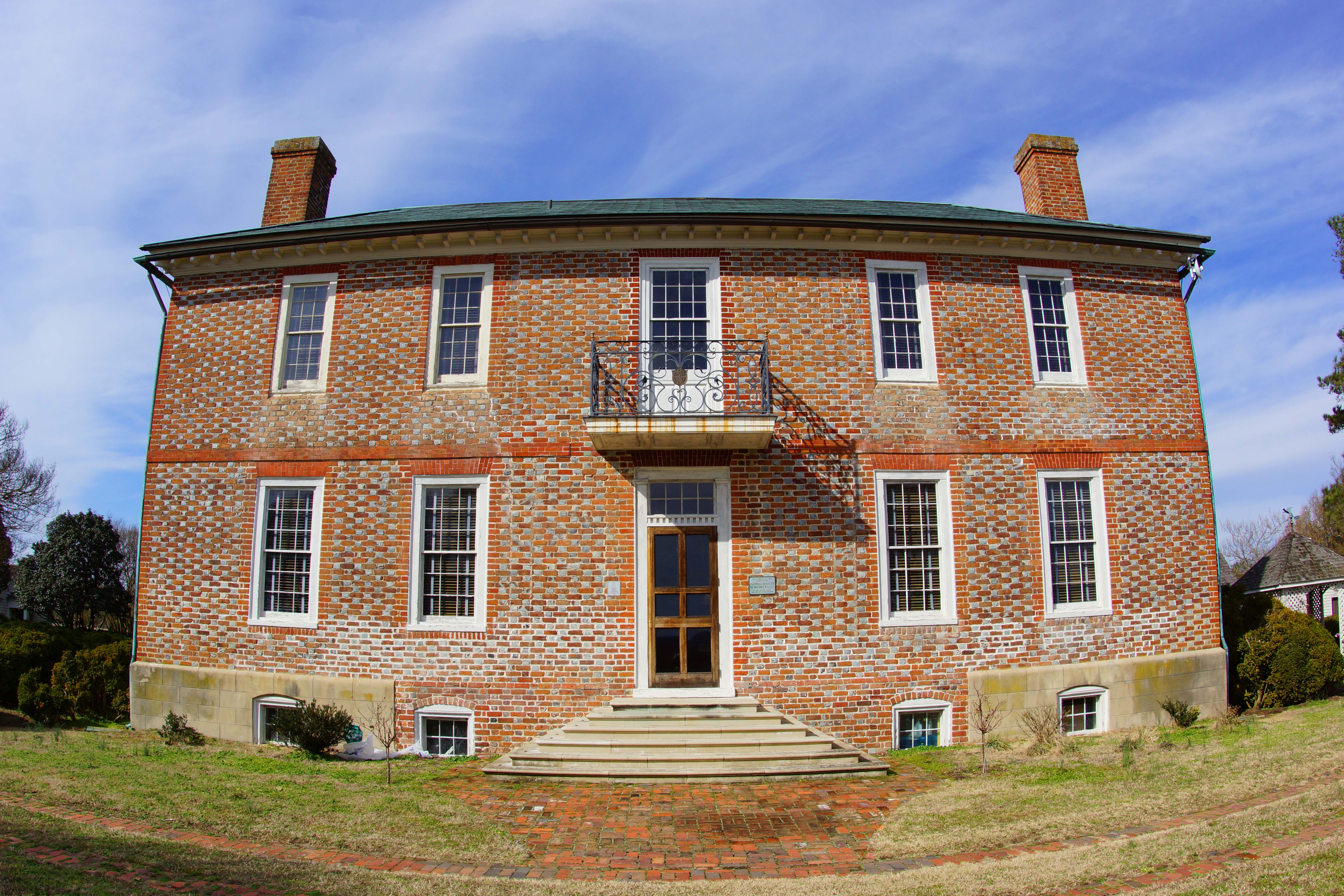
- Front elevation, February 2016

- Location within Virginia Location within the United States
- Location: N of jct. of Chelsea Rd. and Rte. 30, near West Point, Virginia
- Coordinates: 37°35′48″N 76°49′46″W
- Area: 510.5 acres (206.6 ha)
- Built: 1709
- NRHP reference No.: 69000253
- VLR No.: 050-0012

Significant dates
- Added to NRHP: November 12, 1969
- Designated VLR: September 9, 1969

Chelsea is a historic home located near West Point, King William County, Virginia. It was built in 1709, and consists of a two-story, brick main block with a hipped roof and 1 1/2-story, gambrel roofed rear ell. In 1764, Thomas Jefferson attended the wedding of an old friend, John Walker, at Chelsea; sources commonly say (and Jefferson eventually, in 1805, seemed to acknowledge) that he later repeatedly made improper advances to his friend's wife, all of which she rejected. In 1781, shortly before the Battle of Yorktown, Lafayette's army camped at Chelsea, and the Marquis de Lafayette used the house as his headquarters.

It was listed on the National Register of Historic Places in 1969.
