= Thomas Wellbourne =

English colonial politician (1640–1702)

Thomas Wellborn (also: Welbourn, Welbourne, Wellbourne), son of John Wellborn II, was born in Accomack County, Virginia in 1640 and died in 1702. He served as Captain in the King's Militia, and in the Virginia House of Burgesses from 1699 to 1702. He was also a member of the Board of Justices. In 1678, he became the first English settler to claim land on the Fox Islands in Chesapeake Bay, patenting 83 acres (34 hectares) on Little Fox Island. He had a son, William, who served as a soldier in the Revolutionary War.
