= Robert Abrahall =

American politician in Colonial Virginia

Member of the Virginia House of Burgesses from New Kent
- In office March 13, 1660 – March 1662
- Preceded by: William Blacky
- Succeeded by: William Blacky
- In office November 20, 1654 – March 31, 1655
- Preceded by: None (new constituency)
- Succeeded by: William Blacky

Personal details
- Occupation: Planter, Politician; Militia Lieutenant Colonel

Robert Abrahall was the first member of the Virginia House of Burgesses, the elected lower house of the colonial Virginia General Assembly, from New Kent County, Virginia, in 1654. He again served in the House in 1659–1660. He may have served in 1654–1657 since the lists of members for those years are incomplete and no members for New Kent County are shown.

== Biography ==
Coat of Arms of Robert Abrahall

Abrahall settled in New Kent County (part of Gloucester County until 1654) in about 1650, according to Tyler. Captain Robert Abrahall was granted 1010 acres of land in New Kent County by patent on November 23, 1653. This land was on the north side of the Mattapony River (next to Mr. Barnhouse), beginning at the mouth of Apostique Creek (later Mitchell Hill Creek) and on the west side of Quintenocke Creek.

In one list for the 1654 session, he is shown as Captain Robert Abrell. The index to that publication lists the names of Abrahall and Abrell together on the same line.

In 1660, Abrahall is shown as lieutenant colonel of the New Kent County militia.

Robert Abrahall used a seal having the arms of Abrahall of Herefordshire, England.

According to Middlesex records, in 1681, Richard Cawthorn and his wife Ann, widow and executrix of Thomas Abrahall, citizen and skinner of London, gave a power of attorney for use against Robert Abrahall of New Kent County, Virginia, for recovery of property.

Robert Abrahall lived into the 1690s, at least. A record of a wax seal on a deed dated 1690 from Colonel Robert Abrahall of New Kent, Virginia to William Bassett confirms this. Cavaliers and Pioneers: 1666-1695, page 404, states that the Abrahall mentioned in a 1691 patent on page 360 is the same Robert Abrahall who had patented land in 1654, according to a patent abstracted on page 30.
