= Henry Whiting (burgess) =

Member of the Council of State for the Colony of Virginia
- In office 1691–1694

Member of the House of Burgesses from Gloucester County
- In office 1682–1684 Serving with Mathew Kemp, Thomas Pate
- Preceded by: John Armistead
- Succeeded by: John Armistead

Personal details
- Born: 1640 Gloucester County, Virginia Colony, British America
- Died: 1694 Gloucester County, Virginia, U.S.
- Occupation: Planter, politician

Henry Whiting (1640–1694) was a Virginia physician, planter and military officer who served in the House of Burgesses representing Gloucester County, on the Governor's Council, and as the Treasurer of the Virginia Colony.

== Early and family life ==
His father James Whiting had emigrated from Britain and settled in Gloucester County. He married the widow Aphia Wyatt Bushrod (1650–circa 1673) in 1670 and the following year brought suit based on her rights as Richard Bushrod's widow. They had sons Major Henry Whiting (1670–1723) and Col. Francis Whiting (b. 1673). After Aphia's death, Whiting remarried Elizabeth, who bore a daughter (Catherine) and survived him.

== Career ==
Gloucester County voters elected Henry Whiting to the General Assembly (later known as the House of Burgesses) in 1682, and he soon caused consternation for advocating a temporary session of tobacco planting (fertilization then being rare and tobacco using many nutrients, hence repeated plantings in the same area led to stunted crops). Although he was temporarily stripped of his military and civil offices (as major of the local militia and justice of the peace), Whiting won re-election to the Assembly in 1684. He was appointed to the Council of State (otherwise known as the Governor's Council, essentially the upper house of the General Assembly) in 1691 and served until his death in 1694.

== Legacy ==
His son Henry (Jr.) followed his career path as a planter and also won election as the Gloucester County sheriff. His daughter Catherine married John Washington (1692–1746), who had inherited 2,000 acres (8.1 km^{2}) in Gloucester County from his maternal grandfather Augustine Warner (who had represented Gloucester County as a burgess and as speaker of the assembly), and built a home Highgate on the Piankatank River in Gloucester County. Their son (this man's grandson) Warner Washington (1722–1790) would become a friend of his cousin George Washington, move westward to Frederick County in 1770 and establish a farm Fairfield, as well as hold local offices in Gloucester and Frederick Counties.
