= William Bernard (councillor) =

British merchant who became a planter and politician in the Colony of Virginia

Council of State of Virginia
- In office 1641–1665

Personal details
- Born: circa 1603 Kingsthorpe, Northamptonshire, England
- Died: March 31, 1665 Gloucester County, Colony of Virginia, British America
- Spouse: Lucy Higgonson Burwell
- Children: son, 2 daughters
- Occupation: merchant, planter, politician

William Bernard (c. 1603 – March 31, 1665) was a merchant from the Kingdom of England who became a planter and politician in the Colony of Virginia.

== Early and family life ==
Bernard was the third of four sons born to Mary Woolhouse Bernard and her husband Sir Francis Barnard. Although their first son died as an infant, his brother Robert Barnard would inherit Bampton Hall in Huntingdonshire. The family surname has several spelling variations.

== Career ==
William first sailed to the Virginia Colony in 1621, aboard the 'Furtherance' and settled at Basse's Choice in what is now Isle of Wight County. He traveled back and forth between the colony and England at least four times in the next twenty years. He took an oath to become a member of the Governor's Council on March 8, 1642.

He married the widow Lucy Higgonson Burwell, whose husband Lewis Burwell I had vast acreages of land in the Tidewater region, but who died when his son and heir, Lewis Burwell II, was an infant. As such, Bernard became responsible for raising the child, and administering the lands he had inherited until he reached legal age. Bernard thus moved to the main Burwell plantation in Gloucester County. Bernard also had a son by his wife Lucy, as well as two daughters.

== Death and legacy ==
Bernard died on March 31, 1665. He was buried at the Burwell family burying ground. Both his daughters would name sons to honor him.
