= Augustine Moore =

American planter and politician (1754–1787)

Member of the Virginia Senate for Elizabeth City, Warwick and York Counties
- In office May 5, 1777 – May 2, 1779
- Preceded by: David Jameson
- Succeeded by: Corbin Griffin

Member of the Virginia House of Burgesses for King William County
- In office 1773–1775 Serving with William Aylett
- Preceded by: Philip Whitehead Claiborne
- Succeeded by: Carter Braxton

Personal details
- Born: circa 1754 King William County, Province of Virginia
- Died: after 1787 Virginia, US
- Spouse: Sarah Rind
- Relations: Bernard Moore (brother)
- Children: Augustine Moore Jr.
- Parent(s): Bernard Moore, Anna Katherine Spotswood
- Occupation: Planter, militia officer, politician

Augustine Moore (circa 1754–after 1787) was the son of prominent planter and politician Bernard Moore who succeeded his father as a member of the Virginia House of Burgesses representing King William County and at the first Virginia Convention, and then moved toward Hampton Roads, and represented its three counties in the Virginia Senate (1777-1778). Complicating matters, the name "Augustine" was used by two different Moore families in the similar York River watershed area, so the burgess and the senator may have been different people.

== Early and family life ==
The firstborn son of Anne Katherine Spotswood (1725-1802) (the eldest daughter of Governor Alexander Spotswood) and her husband Bernard Moore was born to the First Families of Virginia. His father owned extensive lands in King William County, and his maternal grandfather owned lands nearer the coast in Gloucester County. He would have four brothers who reached adulthood: Thomas Moore (who died unmarried), Bernard Moore (who married Lucy Ann Hebbard Leiper of Chester County, Pennsylvania, whose father was a medical doctor and mother was sister of Maryland Governor William Smallwood), John Moore (who married his cousin Anna Dandridge); and Alexander Spotswood Moore (1763-1799; who married Elizabeth, the daughter of Col. William Aylett, with whom this man served in the Virginia General Assembly). The family also included at least three daughters: Elizabeth Moore Walker (1746-1809; who married Dr. John Walker of Albemarle County, Virginia), Ann Butler Moore Carter (1753-1809; who married Charles Carter of Shirley plantation and became the grandmother of CSA Gen. Robert E. Lee), and Lucy Moore (who married Rev. Henry Skyren).

Augustine Moore received an education appropriate to his class. He married Sarah Rind, and had children.

== Career ==
Augustine Moore like his father became a planter using enslaved labor. His father received many loans, and used some of the proceeds to buy slaves. When his political ally and brother-in-law, powerful Speaker John Robinson died in 1766, the administrator of Robinson's estate found numerous promissory notes from Bernard Moore, who tried to sell land to pay the debt, but could not, so of some of his land and 55 slaves were auctioned. Bernard Moore of Chelsea died in 1775.

Voters in King William County elected Augustine Moore as one of their (part-time) representatives in the House of Burgesses in 1772, following the death of planter Philip Whitehead Claiborne and he served alongside planter William Aylett, although in the following election planter Carter Braxton would replace Moore. After Lord Dunmore dismissed the House of Burgesses, King William County voters elected Aylett, Braxton and this Moore to represent them at the First Virginia Convention, although only the first two would continue to represent the county at the later conventions.

His brothers Bernard Moore Jr. and Alexander Spotswood Moore commanded patriot troops in the conflict, and British raiders reached Chelsea plantation, which Augustine had inherited. However, possibly in connection with his marriage to Sarah Rind, Augustine Moore moved downstream to York County, Virginia, where he operated a plantation. Voters in York County, combined with those in nearby Elizabeth City County and Warwich County elected Augustine Moore to the Virginia Senate in 1777, where he served two years.

In the 1787 Virginia Tax Census, Augustine Moore lived in York County, Virginia, where he owned 19 adult slaves, one 12-16 year old slave, 8 livestock and a 2-wheeled carriage. Either the same man or another named Augustine Moore who died in 1788 also owned 10 adult slaves, 8 younger slaves, 7 horses and 33 cattle and 2 carriage wheels in Elizabeth City County, Virginia (where the York River enters Chesapeake Bay), and his probable sons William Moore owned 7 adult and 10 younger slaves, as well as 6 horses, 41 cattle and two carriage wheels and Augustine Moore Jr. owned one adult and one younger slaves, as well as two horses and 20 cattle and a stud horse—all in Elizabeth City County.

Following his wife's death, Moore (or his son of the same name) may have remarried before or after relocating across the Appalachian Mountains to Washington County, Pennsylvania and died after 1830.
