= Aylett family of Virginia =

Family

The Aylett family of Virginia was a prominent family in King William County in Colonial Virginia.

== History ==
Several of the family members married into the Washington and Lee families. The family probably descended from Thomas Aylett (1570–1650) of Hovells, in Coggleshall, Essex, via his son, William Aylett (1607–1677), who became a merchant in London. It was his son, William Aylett (c. 1640–1679), who moved to Virginia. Aylett, Virginia is named for the family, though a firm documented link between this William and the following Colonel William Aylett of Fairfield Plantation has not yet been established.

== Notable members ==
Notable members of the family include:

- Capt. John Aylett, a distinguished English nobleman and Cavalier during the English Civil War, the youngest son of Sir Benjamin Ayloffe, 2nd Baronet and High Sheriff of Essex. He was born in Magdalen Laver, Essex, England. His grandfather, Sir William Ayloffe of Great Braxted in Essex, was knighted by King James I in 1603 and became a baron in 1612. Aylett fled to Boston, Massachusetts Colony, to escape persecution from the Puritans who had executed the king. He married Mary Hawkins, that year, in a ceremony performed by Humphrey Atherton. He subsequently moved to Virginia.
- Col William Aylett Jr. (c. 1667–1732) -- Founder of Fairfield Plantation where he probably lived from about 1704. Probable son of William Aylett and Lydia Aylett. Married Anne of unknown family. Father of Philip Aylett, Capt. William Aylett III; John Aylett; Benjamin Aylett; Lydia Aylett Boyd (later Herron), Ann Aylett Curtis; Elizabeth Aylett Buckner, Jane Aylett Buckner. Step brother of Jerome Ham Jr.; John Hubbard; Rebecca Edloe (Hubbard); Matthew Hubbard and Matthew Hubbard. First clerk of the Council of Burgesses when King William County was formed in 1702.
- Captain William Aylett III (c. 1703–1744) - Son of Col. William Aylett and Anne Aylett, Wm III married twice (Ann Ashton and Elizabeth Eskridge, later Steptoe) had four daughters, Elizabeth and Anne from his first marriage, and a second Anne and Mary from his second marriage. His Daughter Elizabeth, who was probably the oldest, married Col. William Booth and lived at the Aylett family's Nomini Plantation; his first daughter Anne married George Washington's half brother Augustine Washington Jr. and lived at Pope's Creek.
- Col William Aylett (1743–1781), who married, in 1766, Mary Macon, daughter of Col. James Macon and Elizabeth Moore, of Kennington. He inherited the Aylett plantation, "Fairfield" in King William County, from his father Philip Aylett. Burgess for King William Co., Va., at the assemblies of 1772-1774 and 1775–1776. Member of the Conventions of 1774-1775-1776. Resigned from the convention to accept commission as Deputy Commissary General in Virginia. Died at Battle of Yorktown. His eldest son, Philip (1767–1831) married Elizabeth Henry, a daughter of Patrick Henry.
- Col. William Aylett represented King William County in the Virginia House of Delegates in 1801–1806.
- Col William Roane Aylett (1833–1900) - Lived at the Aylett family's Montville Plantation. Great-grandson of Patrick Henry. Married to Alice Roane Brockenbrough with whom he fathered 12 children. Practiced law; served as colonel of the 53rd Virginia Infantry Regiment in the Confederate States Army during the American Civil War and was present at Pickett's Charge during which he took temporary command of the 53rd. Letters of his are available at the Virginia Historical Society.
- Patrick Henry Aylett (1825–1870) was the elder brother of William Roane Aylett and a Prosecuting Attorney, becoming Distract Attorney for the United States District Court for the Eastern District of Virginia. He also provided editorial material for the Richmond Examiner, and fought a duel with O Jennings Wise of the Richmond Enquirer 15 July 1859, which both survived, over their opposed positions on intervention/non-intervention of Congress with respect to slavery in the territories (Wise for intervention, Aylett for non-intervention). He was killed in the 1870 Virginia State Capitol collapse.

== See also ==
- First Families of Virginia
