= Martha W. McCartney =

American research historian and writer

Martha W. McCartney is an American research historian and writer.

== Biography ==
McCartney is a William and Mary graduate. She worked for thirteen years at the Virginia Research Center for Archaeology, researching and excavating archaeological sites in Virginia. Since 1986 she has worked as an independent historian. She is also a consultant for the Colonial Williamsburg Foundation and was project historian for the five-year Jamestown Archaeological Assessment conducted by the National Park Service.

Her books include James City County: Keystone of the Commonwealth (1997), The History of Green Spring Plantation (1998), The Free Black Community at Centerville (2000), Jamestown: An American Legacy (2001), which won the 2004 National Park Service Excellence in Interpretive Media award in the Cultural Book Category, With Reverence for the Past: Gloucester County, Virginia (2001), Virginia Immigrants and Adventurers 1607–1635: A Biographical Dictionary (2007), Jordan's Point, Virginia: Archaeology in Perspective, Prehistoric to Modern Times (2011), and Mathews County, Virginia: Lost Landscapes, Untold Stories (2015).

McCartney has won historic preservation awards, including a National History Award from the Daughters of the American Revolution in 2001.
