= George Mason (Norfolk burgess) =

American colonial politician of Virginia

Member of the House of Burgesses for Norfolk County
- In office 1705–1706
- Preceded by: James Wilson
- Succeeded by: James Wilson

Personal details
- Born: Lower Norfolk County, Colony of Virginia
- Died: 1710; Norfolk, Colony of Virginia
- Resting place: unknown
- Spouse: Phillis Hobson
- Children: 2 sons, 2 daughters
- Relatives: Lemuel Mason (father), Thomas Mason (brother), Samuel Mason (grandson)

George Mason (died 1710) was an American colonial politician who represented Norfolk County in the House of Burgesses in 1705–1706, although his father Colonel Lemuel Mason had served multiple terms representing that county and nearby Lower Norfolk County.

== Early and family life ==
Mason was born to the former Anne Seawell, daughter of burgess Henry Seawell and her husband, Colonel (and often burgess) Lemuel Mason. He had brothers Lemuel Mason Jr. (possibly a Norfolk merchant who died in 1711) as well as Thomas, and several sisters, including Anne, who married burgess William Kendall, Frances who married burgess George Newton and after his death Major Francis Sayre, Abigail who married burgess George Crafford, Alice who married three times, Elizabeth who married at least twice, Dinah who married Robert Thorogood Jr. and Margaret who moved to England and probably did not marry.

== Career ==
Like his father and brother Thomas, this George Mason long served as one of the justices of the peace for Norfolk County, where he had inherited land from his father. He appears to have patented land in Lynnhaven Parish (which later became part of Princess Anne County, but has not developed it as required, so it escheated and was transferred to Lt.Col. Anthony Lawson. By 1704, six years before his will was admitted to probate, this George Mason was responsible for quitrents on 300 acres in Norfolk County.

Although his father had served multiple terms in the House of Burgesses representing Lower Norfolk County and later Norfolk County, Norfolk voters elected this man as one of their two representatives only once, and he served in the assembly of 1705–1706 alongside Thomas Hodges (who had served in the 1693 session alongside this man's father, and also one session with this man's brother).

== Personal life ==
George married Phillis Hobson and together they had four children: sons Thomas Mason and George Mason Jr. and daughters Frances Mason (who married John Phripp, justice of the peace) and Abigail. Thomas Mason's son, Samuel, served in the American Revolutionary War and later became a river pirate.

== Death and legacy ==
George Mason's will was admitted to probate in 1710. His widow eventually deeded land she received from him, as well as from her father, to her sons.
