= Samuel Boush =

Samuel Boush may refer to:

- Samuel Boush (died 1736), first mayor of Norfolk, Virginia
- Samuel Boush Jr. (fl. 1752–1754), 18th century Virginia politician
- Samuel Boush Sr. (fl. 1728–1747), 18th century Virginia politician
