= John A. Gurkin =

American politician

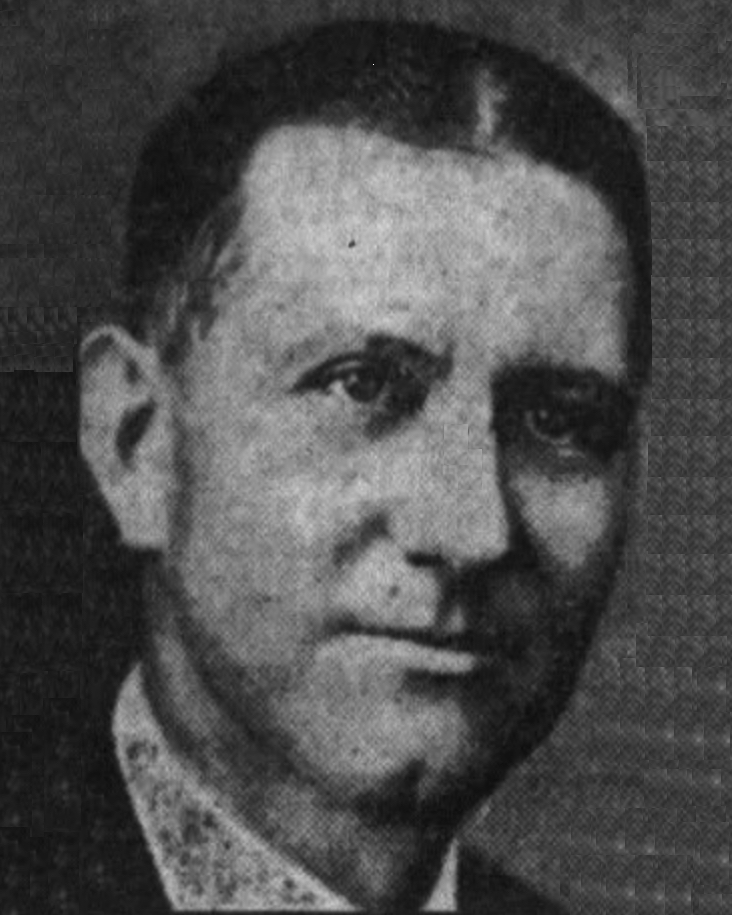

155th Mayor of Norfolk, Virginia
- In office September 1, 1938 – August 31, 1940
- Preceded by: Walton R. L. Taylor
- Succeeded by: Joseph D. Wood

Personal details
- Born: John Arch Gurkin; September 17, 1888; Dardens, North Carolina, U.S.
- Died: December 25, 1976 (aged 88); Norfolk, Virginia, U.S.
- Political party: Democratic
- Spouse: Pearl Bell Vail (m. 1907; died 1973)
- Children: 3
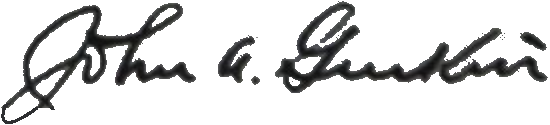
- Signature

John Arch Gurkin (September 17, 1888 – December 25, 1976) was an American electrical contractor and politician who served on the Norfolk, Virginia city council. Born in the coastal plain region of North Carolina, he moved to Norfolk at the age of 16 to enter the electrical business, establishing his own successful firm two years later. He was active in business and civic circles.

After running an unsuccessful campaign for the council in 1930, Gurkin was elected in 1932 with the support of former Congressman Joseph T. Deal. He won reelection four years later, and, in 1938, he succeeded in displacing W. R. L. Taylor as president of the council and mayor of the city.

== Early life and family ==
=== Childhood and education ===
Gurkin was born on September 17, 1888, in Dardens, North Carolina as one of six children of Mary Elwood (née McCaskey; 1850–1915) and Warren William Gurkin (1853–1898). He attended Hampton Academy in Washington County.

=== Marriage and children ===
On July 17, 1907, Gurkin married the former Pearl Bell Vail. They had three children: Agnes (b. 1910), Louise (b. 1911), and John Jr. (b. 1918).

== Career ==
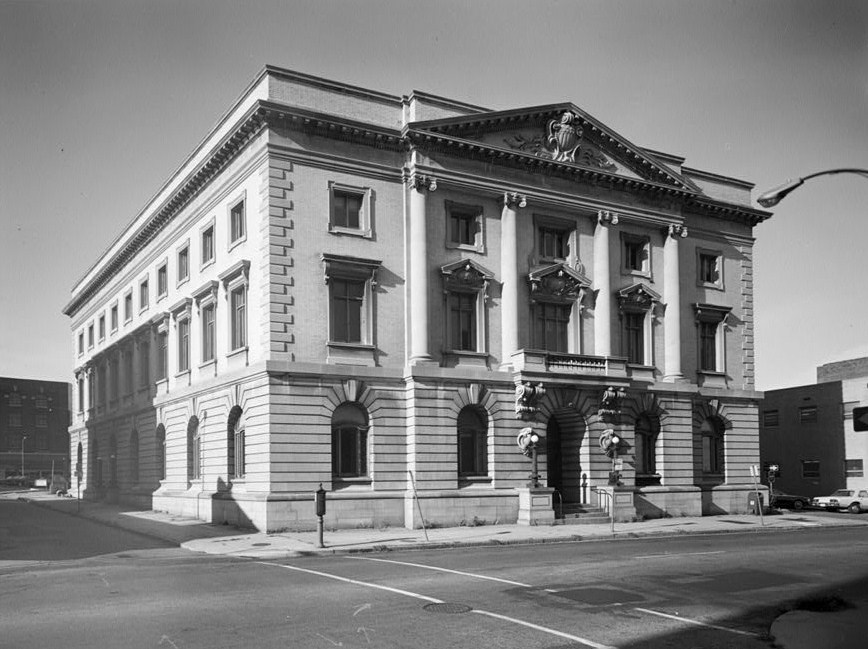
1981 photograph of the old U.S. Post Office and Courts building that served as Norfolk's city hall from 1937 to 1965

=== Business and civic life ===
Gurkin moved to Norfolk, Virginia at the age of 16 and founded his electrical contracting firm, the John A. Gurkin Electrical Company, two years later. He was a member of Knights of Pythias Norfolk Lodge No. 38 and the Benevolent and Protective Order of Elks and was a parishioner of Christ and St. Luke's Church.

=== Politics ===
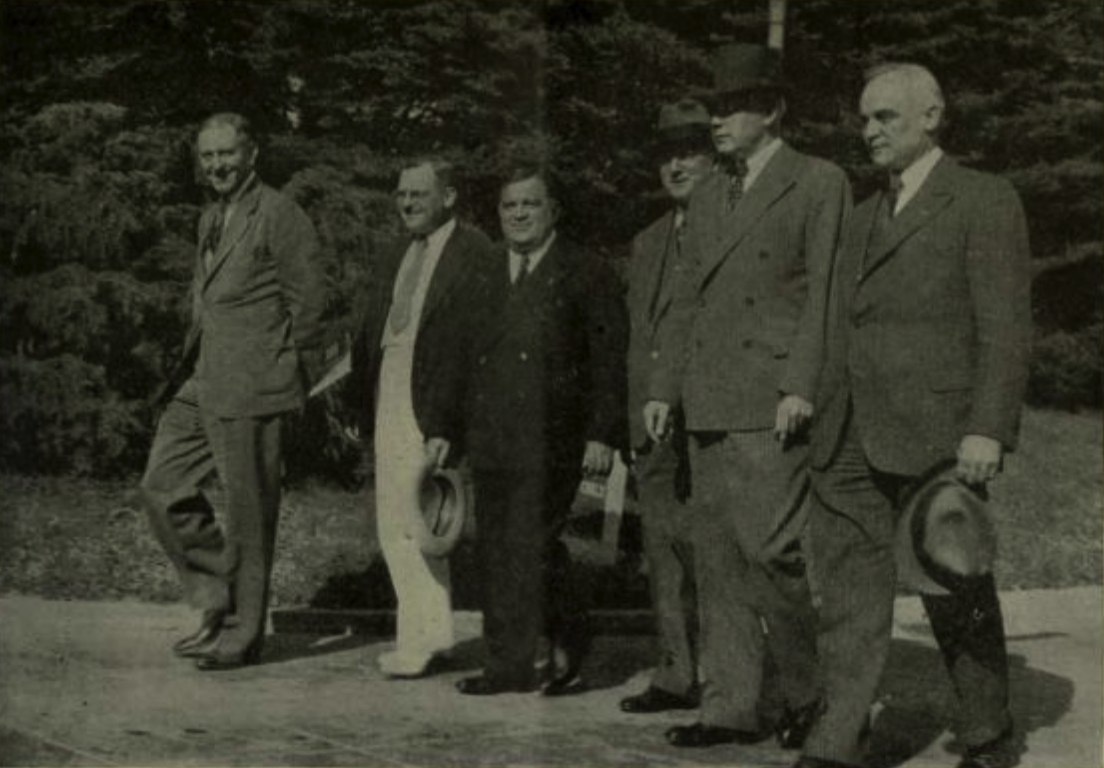
Mayors of U.S. cities on their way to visit the White House in September 1939; from left to right are Gurkin, J. James Davis of South Norfolk; Fiorello La Guardia of New York City, Howard W. Jackson of Baltimore, Oscar F. Holcombe of Houston, and Harold H. Burton of Cleveland

On November 28, 1929, Gurkin, an active Democrat, announced his first campaign for public office. Running as an independent candidate in the following June's city council election, he was viewed as friendly to the existing city government but declined to form any political alliances. Despite predictions that he would win a seat on the council, he placed in seventh among the eight candidates.

Undeterred after his loss, Gurkin mounted another campaign in 1932, this time alongside Dr. Albert E. Wilson. Running on an anti-administration platform, the two alleged extravagant spending and improper campaign financing on the part of the incumbent councilors. Gurkin and Wilson garnered the support of former Congressman Joseph T. Deal and were elected by respective margins of 1,768 and 1,828 out of 8,723 votes cast.

Gurkin won reelection four years later on a ticket with James W. Reed that had the support of most of the city's Democratic organization. Halfway through this term, in 1938, he cast a tie-breaking vote for himself, displacing W. R. L. Taylor as president of the council and mayor of the city. He did not win reelection in 1940.

== Later life and death ==
Gurkin died on December 25, 1976, in Norfolk. He was interred in the family mausoleum at Forest Lawn Cemetery, alongside his wife, who preceded him in death approximately four years earlier. The family home at 707 Baldwin Avenue in Norfolk's North Ghent neighborhood, which Gurkin built in 1920 and lived in until his death, still stands today.
