= Malachi Thruston =

Politician of The Colony of Virginia

Member of the House of Burgesses for Norfolk County
- In office 1698
- Preceded by: Thomas Mason
- Succeeded by: Richard Church

Member of the House of Burgesses for Princess Anne County
- In office 1692
- Preceded by: n/a
- Succeeded by: Jacob Johnson

Member of the House of Burgesses for Lower Norfolk County
- In office Nov. 1682
- Preceded by: Anthony Lawson
- Succeeded by: William Robinson
- In office 1676
- Preceded by: John Porter
- Succeeded by: Arthur Moseley

Personal details
- Born: Jan. 19, 1636; Bristol, England
- Died: May 14, 1698; Norfolk, Colony of Virginia
- Resting place: unknown
- Spouse: Martha Porter
- Children: 3 sons, 3 daughters

Malachi Thruston (Jan 19, 1636-May 14, 1698) was the clerk of court for Norfolk County who invested in escheated real estate in nearby counties, and briefly represented Lower Norfolk County in the House of Burgesses during Bacon's Rebellion, as well as Princess Anne County upon its creation in 1692 and finally Norfolk County in the year he died.

== Early and family life ==
Probably borne in Bristol, Somerset, England to the former Thomasine Rich (1604-1647) and her chamberlain husband John Thruston.

== Career ==
Thruston invested in real estate near Norfolk and adjoining rural counties, and was a justice of the peace and clerk of a county court by 1666. He may have been a medical doctor, and many of his early purchases were small parcels from escheated estates. In 1685 Thruston patented more than 900 acres at the headwaters of the eastern branch of the Elizabeth River. Lower Norfolk County voters elected this man as one of their two representatives in the House of Burgesses in early 1676 at the beginning of Bacon's Rebellion, but replaced both burgesses during the rebellion (new elections being held for the mid-1676 session). Lower Norfolk County voters did not send anyone to the General Assembly for several years before sending Lemuel Mason and Anthony Lawson in 1680, with this man replacing Lawson for the late 1682 session which Governor Culpeper personally opened. A decade later, when Virginia's legislature split Princess Anne County from Norfolk County, Thruston became one of that new county's two burgesses. At the end of his life, Thruston clearly lived in Norfolk, as well as represented Norfolk County in the House of Burgesses.

== Personal life ==
Thruston married Martha (1640-1698), the daughter of Norfolk County burgess John Porter. They had three sons (John, James and Malachi Jr.(1660-1703)) and three daughters (Sarah, Jeane and Martha).

== Death and legacy ==
Both Thruston and his wife died in 1698, which may have accounted for the year's delay (until November 15, 1699) in admitting his will (which named his late wife as well as his sister-in-law Jeane Porter as co-executors of his estate) into probate. Following the (nonexistent) life estate, his Norfolk lots and a plantation called "Brushy Neck" which he had inherited from Richard Jones were to be divided among their sons. Malachi Jr. also inherited a plantation called "Lynnhaven" in Princess Anne County, and his daughter Sarah received a plantation called "Currituck", also in Princess Anne County.
