= Thomas Mason (burgess) =

Politician of The Colony of Virginia

Member of the House of Burgesses for Norfolk County
- In office 1696-1697
- Preceded by: William Crafford
- Succeeded by: Malachi Thruston

Personal details
- Born: Lower Norfolk County, Colony of Virginia
- Died: Colony of Virginia
- Resting place: unknown
- Spouse: Elizabeth

Thomas Mason (died 1711) was an American colonial politician who represented Norfolk County in the House of Burgesses in 1696-1697, although his father Colonel Lemuel Mason had served multiple terms representing that county and nearby Lower Norfolk County.

== Early and family life ==
Mason was born to the former Anne Seawell, daughter of burgess Henry Seawell and her husband, Colonel (and often burgess) Lemuel Mason. He had brothers Lemuel Mason Jr. (possibly a Norfolk merchant who died in 1711) as well as George (who died in 1710), and several sisters, including Anne, who married burgess William Kendall, Frances who married burgess George Newton and after his death Major Francis Sayre, Abigail who married burgess George Crafford, Alice who married three times, Elizabeth who married at least twice, Dinah who married Robert Thorogood Jr. and Margaret who moved to England and probably did not marry.

== Career ==
Like his father, Mason long served as one of the justices of the peace for Lower Norfolk County, where he had inherited land from his father. He characterized himself as "gentleman and planter of Tanner's Creek". The tidal estuary once known as Tanner's Creek empties into the Elizabeth River just south of Sewell's Point, named after his maternal grandfather. It is unclear whether he or another man of the same name received 1000 acres in what was then Upper Nansemond County in 1666 for transporting 20 persons to the Virginia Colony. By 1704, six years before he wrote his last will and testament, this Thomas Mason was responsible for quitrents on 653 acres in Norfolk County.

Although his father had served multiple terms in the House of Burgesses representing Lower Norfolk County and later Norfolk County, Norfolk voters elected this man as one of their two representatives only once, and he served in the assembly of 1696-1697 alongside Thomas Hodges (who had served in the 1693 session alongside this man's father, and would again serve in 1703 and with this man's brother).

== Personal life ==
Thomas married Elizabeth and together they had four children:

- Lemuel Mason (no issue, died by 1712)
- Ann Mason, who married Captain Thomas Willoughby
- Mary Mason, who married William Ellison
- Margaret Mason

Family of Thomas Mason (burgess)

Henry Seawell	Alice
Anne Seawell	Lemuel Mason	William Kendall
Thomas Mason	Anne Mason	William Kendall II
William Kendall III

== Death and legacy ==
Thomas Mason's will was admitted to probate in 1711. His widow remarried, to Richard Sanderson of North Carolina, who sold this wife's interest in Norfolk County property to George Newton of Norfolk County.
