= Edmund Scarborough (burgess 1723) =

Virginia politician (d. 1753)

- Coat of arms

Member of the House of Burgesses for Accomack County
- In office 1738–1740 Serving with Edward Allen, Sacker Parker
- Preceded by: Samuel Ewell
- Succeeded by: Henry Scarburgh
- In office 1723–1726
- Preceded by: Solomon Ewell
- Succeeded by: William Andrews

Personal details
- Born: Accomack County, Virginia
- Died: 1753 York County, Virginia
- Resting place: Accomack County, Virginia
- Spouse: Anna Maria Jones
- Occupation: Planter, naval officer, politician

Colonel Edmund Scarborough (died 1753) was a Virginia planter, naval officer and politician who twice represented Accomack County in the House of Burgesses from 1723 to 1726 and 1738 to 1740. Born to the family of merchants and planters alternately spelled "Scarburg" and "Scarborough", his name probably honors two emigrant ancestors: Edmund Scarborough Sr. and his son of the same name Edmund Scarborough (who served multiple terms as a burgess representing Virginia's Eastern Shore, as well as one term as Speaker of the House of Burgesses). This man also served as Accomac County's sheriff in 1721 and naval officer (tax collector) beginning in 1731. He moved across the bay to York County, Virginia where he married Anna Maria Jones, and had a son William, daughters Elizabeth Hall and Priscilla Johnson, and a grandson (also) Edmund Scarburgh.
