= Delamater Davis =

American politician (1886–1966)

Member of the Virginia House of Delegates
- In office 1944–1963
- In office 1939–1939

Personal details
- Born: February 9, 1886 Cleveland, Ohio, U.S.
- Died: January 10, 1966 (aged 79) Norfolk, Virginia, U.S.
- Spouse: Estelle Barton Hubbard
- Children: 2
- Occupation: Politician; lawyer

Delamater Davis (February 9, 1886 – January 10, 1966) was an American politician and lawyer from Virginia. He served in the Virginia House of Delegates.

== Early life ==
Delamater Davis was born on February 9, 1886, in Cleveland, Ohio. His father was a weatherman. In 1910, he moved to Norfolk, Virginia. He attended public schools in Norfolk and graduated high school with Walton R. L. Taylor. He studied law at the YMCA in Norfolk. He passed the law examination in July 1917.

== Career ==
In 1917, Davis began practicing as a lawyer. At the time of his death, he was a member of the law firm Delamater Davis & Son. He served in the Virginia House of Delegates one term in 1939 and from 1944 to 1963. In July 1942, Davis stopped running the Norfolk office of the state's delinquent tax section following the office's discontinuation.

== Personal life ==
Davis married Estelle Barton Hubbard. They had two children, Joseph and Delamater. He was an Episcopalian.

Davis died on January 10, 1966, in Norfolk.
