= James Mason (burgess) =

Politician of The Colony of Virginia

Member of the House of Burgesses for Surry County
- In office 1654-55
- Preceded by: William Buttler
- Succeeded by: William Buttler

Personal details
- Born: Lower Norfolk County, Colony of Virginia
- Died: circa 1667; Surry County, Colony of Virginia
- Resting place: unknown
- Spouse: Elizabeth Aston Binns
- Children: Francis Mason

James Mason (d. circa 1667) was a Virginia planter, real estate investor and politician who represented Surry County in the House of Burgesses in 1654–55, although his half-brother Colonel Lemuel Mason would serve multiple terms representing Lower Norfolk County and later Norfolk County.

== Early and family life ==
Mason was a son of ancient planter Lt. Francis Mason of Lower Norfolk County, Virginia, probably with this first wife Mary. Although sources long disagreed as to the relationship between the Surry County and Norfolk area Mason families, he had a brother, Francis Mason Jr. (who may have died as a youth) as well as a younger half brother (by his father's second wife) Lemuel Mason.

== Career ==
By 1647, Mason had patented 450 acres in Isle of Wight County, and beginning in 1652 began acquiring land in neighboring Surry County. He was living in Surry County by 1652, when he served on a coroner's jury.

Surry County voters elected Mason whose plantation was called "Mathewes Mount," as one of their representatives in the House of Burgesses.

== Personal life ==
James Mason married the widow Elizabeth Aston Binns, daughter of Lt.Col. Walter Aston of Westover plantation. They had a son, Francis Mason (b. 1647)

== Death and legacy ==
James Mason last served on the Surry County court on May 14, 1660, and died sometime after April of May 1665. In May 1668 his 21-year-old son Francis referred to him as deceased.
