= Lemuel Mason =

Colonial politician of The Colony of Virginia

Member of the House of Burgesses for Lower Norfolk County
- In office 1680-1687 Serving with Anthony Lawson, Malachi Thruston, William Robinson
- Preceded by: John Porter
- Succeeded by: William Crawford
- In office 1671-1673 Serving with Richard Lawrence
- Preceded by: John Knowles
- Succeeded by: John Porter
- In office 1662 Serving with John Porter
- Preceded by: John Warren
- Succeeded by: Adam Thoroughgood Jr.
- In office 1654-1660 Serving with Richard Foster, Bartholomew Hoskins, Thomas Lambert, John Sidney John Warren
- Preceded by: Argall Yeardley
- Succeeded by: John Warren

Personal details
- Born: c. 1628 Surry County, Colony of Virginia
- Died: Colony of Virginia
- Spouse: Anne Sewall
- Children: 10 including Thomas Mason
- Education: Oxford University

Colonel Lemuel Mason (b. c. 1628 – d. 1702) was an early Virginia planter, politician, justice of the peace, and militia colonel, who represented Lower Norfolk County in the House of Burgesses intermittently over three decades.

== Early and family life ==
Mason was born around 1628 in then-vast Surry County to ancient planter Francis Mason and his second wife Alice. By the mid-1620s, his father was a planter in Elizabeth City County. There has long been disagreement as to whether his father Francis Mason or another man of the same name emigrated to the Virginia colony with his first wife Mary and daughter Anne in 1613 and settled in Surry County (south of Jamestown but north of Elizabeth City county). His mother had emigrated to the Virginia Colony in 1622, months after Native Americans had killed many settlers. This man had half brothers named Francis and James (the latter moving to Surry County by 1637 and representing it as a burgess in the 1654-1655 session), and sisters named Anne, Elizabeth and Alice. In the 1624 muster for Elizabeth City, Francis Mason (aged about 40) was living with his younger wife Alice, Virginia-born son Francis and five indentured servants. In 1626, shortly before this boy's birth, either his father Francis Mason or elder half brother Francis Jr. returned to England with William Ganey. By 1635 this man's father patented land in what became Lower Norfolk County (but was then Elizabeth City County, Lower Norfolk County being formed in 1637). Although the underlying document for that transaction is lost, in 1642 Francis Mason claimed 1250 acres of land for transporting 83 people to the colony. Before his death (without a will) circa 1648, this man's father Francis Mason became a local magistrate (even hosted the county court), church vestryman, lieutenant of the county militia, tobacco inspector and even sheriff. His widow and this young Lemuel Mason were appointed administrators of his estate in 1648.

== Career ==
In the year of his father's death, Lemuel Mason and his mother contracted with James Thelaball to buy land and timber from Hogg Island. Thelaball would marry this man's sister Elizabeth, who bore sons named Francis and James, and in 1677 she divided 600 acres on Hogg Penn Neck that this Lemuel Mason had given her between those sons (her son Lemuel having died in the interim). Meanwhile, this Lemuel Mason farmed at least in part using enslaved labor, for in 1673 he deeded three named young Negro boys to his wife and two daughters.

By 1649 (the year of his father-in-law's death), Lemuel Mason had become a justice of the peace in Lower Norfolk County (a position he continued until his death), and a churchwarden in his own right. He became the county sheriff in 1664 and again 1668. Colonel Mason commanded the local militia in 1680, a year in which he also became presiding justice of the county court (and thus effectively administered the county per practice in that era).

In 1654, Lemuel Mason and Willoughby bought land on the Pasquotank River in what became the Carolina colony, after Francis Yeardley's trade expedition. By 1659 Virginians had begun moving into the western bank of Albemarle Sound. In 1680, Lemuel Mason deeded land in Currituck, North Carolina to George Crafford and his wife Abigail.

Lower Norfolk voters elected Lemuel Mason to represent them in the House of Burgesses in 1654 and re-elected him in 1657 through 1660. He appears not to have served in the legislature through the entire Long Assembly, but had a gap in service before winning election (or agreeing to serve) in 1662, and then again in 1671-1673. During Bacon's Rebellion, Arthur Moreley and Richard Church represented Lower Norfolk County, which did not again send a representative to the legislature until 1680, when either this man or his son of the same name served and was re-elected in 1684 and 1685. Other men won election and served in the 1688 and 1691-1692 sessions. In the two separately elected 1693 sessions, either this man or his son of the same name represented Norfolk County.

Meanwhile, in the immediate aftermath of Bacon's Rebellion, in January 1676, Mason wrote Governor Berkeley seeking recompense from the estate of the executed William Carver for the local militia's need to resupply weapons taken by Carver, as well as crop losses incurred by 60 loyal Lower Norfolk men who traveled to James City to assist the governor. Although records survive of Lemuel Taylor and Robert Bray being appointed commissioners for Carver's estate, their bond (relating to the estate's size) is illegible.

== Personal life ==
Lemuel Mason married to Anne Seawald/Seawell, daughter of Henry Seawald/Seawell of Sewell's Point. Together they had children:

- Elizabeth Mason, who married (first) William Major, and (second) Captain Thomas Cocke
- Lemuel Mason, living in 1705
- George Mason, who married Phillis. They had children Thomas Mason, who married Mary Newton; George Mason Jr.; Abigail Mason; and Frances Mason
- Thomas Mason, who became a Burgess in October 1696. He married Elizabeth. They had children Lemuel Mason (no issue); Ann Mason, who married Captain Thomas Willoughby; Mary Mason, who married William Ellison; and Margaret Mason
- Frances Mason, who married (first) George Newton, and (second) Mr. Sayer
- Alice Mason, who married (first) Robert Hodge, and (second) Samuel Boush
- Mary Mason, who married (first) Mr. Walton, and (second) Mr. Cocke
- Dinah Mason, who married Mr. Thoroughgood
- Margaret Mason
- Anne Mason, who married William Kendall II, son of William Kendall

Family of Lemuel Mason

Henry Seawell	Alice
Anne Seawell	Lemuel Mason	William Kendall
Thomas Mason	Anne Mason	William Kendall II
William Kendall III

== Death and legacy ==
Mason's will was dated June 17, 1695 and was proved September 15, 1702. Both his sons briefly attempted to carry on his political legacy representing Norfolk County in the House of Burgesse, but each served only in one session: Thomas in 1696-7 (during this man's life) and George in 1705-6.
