= Charles Scarborouh (burgess) =

Virginia politician (1642–1702)

Charles Scarborough

Member of the Virginia Governor's Council
- In office 1696-1702

Member of the House of Burgesses for Accomac County
- In office 1688–1692 Serving with William Anderson
- Preceded by: William Kendall
- Succeeded by: Richard Balie
- In office June 1680 – 1684 Serving with Daniel Jenifer, Edward Read
- Preceded by: Southey Littleton
- Succeeded by: William Kendall

Personal details
- Born: circa 1642 Accomack County, Virginia
- Died: 1702 Accomack County, Virginia
- Resting place: Hedra Cottage, Accomack County, Virginia
- Spouse: Elizabeth Bennett
- Occupation: Farmer, surveyor, military officer, merchant, politician

Charles Scarborough (c. 1643 – 1702; also spelled "Scarburgh" or "Scarburg") was a controversial planter, surveyor, politician and military officer who represented Accomack County on the Eastern Shore of Virginia) for most of the years between 1684 and 1692 (after paying a fine for his part in Bacon's Rebellion in 1676-1677), then served on the Virginia Governor's Council (1696-1702).

== Early and family life ==
The eldest son of powerful speaker and merchant Edmund Scarborough and his wife Mary. He had brothers Littleton Scarborough and Edmund Scarborough Jr.

Charles Scarborough traveled to London for his education, as was customary for boys of his class in that era, and did not return to the colony until 1664.

== Career ==
=== Planter ===
Depending on his age, either his father patented considerable acreage on the Eastern Shore in Charles' name when he was a boy, or he began doing so upon reaching legal age. That included 550 acres in 1647, which Charles sold to Major John Tilney in 1664 (after this man reached legal age, or because his father had just become the King's collector of quitrents for the area). In 1649, their father patented 2000 acres in Accomack County in the name of the family's youngest son, Littleton Scarborough, who died without issue shortly after their father in 1671, whereupon this man and his brother Edmond Scarborough Jr. both claimed the land. In 1672, the General Court ruled in favor of Edmund Jr. and ordered a resurvey, after which Edmund Jr. received a patent for 2,350 acres. Another 3,050 acres at Pungoteague were patented in Charles Scarborough's name in 1652, which Charles repatented in 1664, and which became his main plantation, "Fairfield" when he returned to the colony after his education in England. In 1678, Scarborough and Major John West acquired 400 acres on Tangier Island, which parcel had more than doubled by 1708 when Scarborough's widow and Anthony West sold it. In 1683, Scarborough owned 9950 acres in Accomac County. He apparently borrowed money from his mother, which he had failed to repay before her final illness, so she made a final codicil to her will in 1691, which eliminated him from other planned legacies.

=== Military officer and politician ===
Scarborough also began holding local offices on the Eastern Shore. In 1673 he surveyed land disputed between the Chingoskin people and colonist Thomas Harmonson. The "Gingaskins" a/k/a Accomac held a reservation near modern Eastville from 1640 until 1813.

His father and father-in-law had multiple disagreements with Virginia's longtime governor Berkeley. During Bacon's Rebellion, like his commanding officer, Colonel William Kendall, Captain Charles Scarborough sympathized with the rebels and criticized Governor Berkeley. Thus, both Kendall and Scarborough were initially denied pardons in Governor Berkeley's proclamation of 10 February 1676/7. Possibly through the intervention of his brother Edmund Jr. (who remained loyal to Gov. Berkley through the rebellion unlike his cousin William Scarborough), a court fined Charles Scarborough 70 pounds sterling, which Scarborough paid and took the oath of obedience, as did Major John Wise. However, Scarborough was again brought before a court for uttering seditious language in 1688. Although one author states the nature of the words and that outcome are now unknown, according to Lyon Gardiner Tyler, he was removed as justice in 1687 for saying "King James would wear out the Church of England", which words were considered offensive until the Glorious Revolution the next year, when Scarborough was again appointed a justice of the peace. In 1693 Scarborough was commander in chief of the local militia, a justice of the peace and president of the Accomack court. He also was naval officer and tax collector for the Eastern Shore by 1691.

Charles Scarborough began his colony-wide public career a decade earlier, in 1682, when he succeeded his former militia commander Kendall as one of Accomack County's (part-time) representatives in the House of Burgesses. Although several descendants shared the same name, only this Charles Scarborough held statewide office, serving first as a burgess representing Accomack County, then on the Council of State.

In 1691 Charles Scarborough was one of nine men who secured a charter and founded the College of William & Mary in Williamsburg.

According to Lyon Gardiner Tyler, Governor Nicholson noticed the vacancies on the governor's council and recommended this man for one of them, noting his status as nephew of Sir Charles Scarborough. Scarborough was appointed, but for a time left out of the council, so he was again sworn in as a member in 1697.

== Personal life ==
Charles Scarborough may have married multiple times, or some may have confused him with a relative of the same name. In 1654 the widow Katherine West Barlow (daughter of Anthony West who may have survived an indenture in York County Virginia before moving to Northampton County, and widow of Ralph Barlow, merchant of Southampton England and Elizabeth City County, then Northampton County) entered into a marriage contract with Charles Scarborough. Her brother, carpenter and Lt.Col. John West of Northampton County married his man's sister Matilda. Her sons Ralph Benoni Barlow and Henry Scarborough both died childless by 1676, but in 1685 "Mrs. Catherine Scarbrow" married the widower Maj. Edmund Bowman of Accomac County.

This Charles Scarborough clearly married Elizabeth Bennett, daughter of dissenter Richard Bennett of Somerset, England who moved to the Virginia Colony south of the James River and served in both Houses of the Virginia General Assembly, then became its governor during the Cromwell/Commonwealth era before moving to Anne Arundel County, Maryland. Her brother, also Richard Bennett, educated at Harvard College, represented Baltimore County in the Maryland Assembly (1663-1664) before becoming a judge in that county for the last year of his life; his widow married Philamon Lloyd of Talbot County, Maryland, who raised their son Richard Bennett III (who returned from Bristol, England to Queen Anne County, Maryland a wealthy man, but died in 1749 without children) and daughter Susanna Maria (who married John Darnall of Calvert County, Maryland who served in the Maryland Assembly and Council and was that colony's secretary from 1682 until his death in 1685, then married Lt. Col. Henry Lowe, also an assemblyman). The Bennett marriage solidified the Scarborough family's power on the Eastern shore. His sister in law Anne Bennett married Theodorick Bland and then St. Leger Codd, both powerful Virginia politicians, although she and Codd ultimately moved to Cecil County, Maryland.

Elizabeth Bennett Scarborough bore three sons (Bennett, Charles Jr. and Henry) and five daughters (Ann, Elizabeth, Mary, Sarah and Tabitha) who reached adulthood and remained among the First Families of Virginia. The eldest son, Major Bennett Scarborough, inherited property on the Eastern Shore and married twice before his death in 1734 (his widow marrying William Kitchen of Somerset County, Maryland) but never held colony-wide office. Charles Scarborough Jr. likewise never held statewide office, but Henry Scarborough continued the family's political tradition before his death in 1735. Their sister Ann Scarborough married George Parker and had several children (their grandson George Parker (judge) continuing the family's military and political traditions). Elizabeth married Capt. Richard Drummond (who served as burgess) who survived her, as did their daughter Scarburgh. Mary married four times, to Charles Baily, Edmund Baily, Edmund Leatherbury and John McChester. Tabitha married John Bagwell (possibly the longtime county clerk). Sarah married Rev. William Black, the minister of Accomac Parish (1709-1729). Each child inherited land and enslaved people. Elizabeth Bennett Scarborough never remarried and clearly survived her husband, from whom she received a life estate on his 3,050 home plantation (which adding to her prior holdings accounts for the 4205 acres she held in 1704), and the following year she was awarded funeral expenses for Edward Randolph Esq., who died there. Scarborough's main plantation then passed to his son Henry and grandson Henry, both of whom would later also serve as burgesses, but Henry II sold the property to George Parker after petitioning the Assembly to end the entail.

== Death and legacy ==
Scarborough wrote his will on August 6, 1701 which was admitted to probate on October 6, 1702, and in 1704 his widow held 4205 acres in Accomac County and did not remarry. Elizabeth Bennett Scarborough wrote her will on June 2, 1718 which was admitted to probate on August 4, 1719.
