= Obedience Robbins =

North American Colonial English merchant, planter and politician

Member of the Virginia Governor's Council
- In office 1656-1660

Member of the House of Burgesses for Northampton County
- In office 1652–1653 Serving with Edmund Scarborough, William Jones, Thomas Johnson, Anthony Hoskins, Stephen Charlton
- Preceded by: Stephen Charlton
- Succeeded by: Stephen Horsey
- In office 1644–1645 Serving with Edward Douglas
- Preceded by: William Roper
- Succeeded by: Edmund Scarborough

Member of the House of Burgesses for Accomack County
- In office 1640–1643 Serving with John Neale, John Wilkins
- Preceded by: William Burditt
- Succeeded by: Edmund Scarborough
- In office 1630–1633 Serving with Edmund Scarborough Sr., Henry Bagwell, Thomas Graves

Personal details
- Born: April 26, 1600 England
- Died: December 30, 1662 (aged 62) Accomack County, Virginia colony
- Occupation: Surgeon, planter, miller, military officer, politician

Colonel Obedience Robbins (also written as Robins) (c.April 26, 1600—c.December 30, 1662), a surgeon, emigrated from England to Virginia's Eastern Shore, which he represented in both houses of the Virginia General Assembly during the mid-17th century.

== Early and family life ==
Obedience Robbins was born shortly before April 26, 1600, to Richard Robbins and Dorothy Goodman, in Long Buckby, Northamptonshire, England.

He emigrated to the Virginia Colony in 1628 with his brother Edward, and both settled near the capital at Jamestown, but Obedience soon moved to Virginia's Eastern shore, buying land in what was then Accomac Shire, where he called his home "Cherrystone".

Complicating matters, a man named John Robins, possibly a relative, emigrated to the Eastern Shore in 1625 as an indentured servant on a ship captained by William Eppes, and may have been related to a John Robins who by 1623, patented (claimed) 300 acres of land on the west side of the Chickahominy River, and whose son John Robins II repatented that land in 1639 and in 1642 began acquiring additional land on the Middle Peninsula in Gloucester County on the other side of the Hampton Roads harbor from the Eastern Shore. That John Robins II served as a burgess for Elizabeth City County, Virginia and prepared his last will in November 1655 which named his sons as Thomas and John (deceased), and grandsons Benjamin, Thomas II and William.

== Career ==
Obedience Robbins was a surgeon who acquired land and resided on the Eastern Shore. In 1642 he paid a local carpenter to construct a mill.

In February 1631/1632 Robbins was appointed as a justice of the peace in Accomack County, the justices jointly also administering counties in that era. He also became a vestryman of the parish in 1632 and by 1634 also deputy lieutenant of the local militia. However, he refused to issue warrants to collect parish taxes, so one modern historian believes he may have had Puritan leanings. By 1652, Robbins had been promoted to major in the local militia, and became Lieutenant Colonel by 1654-1656. On March 12, 1656, the colony's legislature appointed him colonel of the "lower precinct" of the Eastern Shore.

Accomack County voters first elected Robbins as a (part-time) Burgess to represent them in the House of Burgesses in 1630, and re-elected him several times, although they also elected other men to accompany or replace him. From 1656 until 1660, Robbins also served as a member of the Governor's Council.

During his years in Virginia, Robbins became an ardent foe of Colonel Edmund Scarborough. Local legend claims Northampton County was named after Robbin's Northamptonshire birthplace in England. After Robbins' death, Scarborough wanted the county divided.

== Personal life ==
In 1634, Obedience Robbins married the former Grace Neale (widow of Edward Waters) in Virginia. She already had a son, William Waters, whom this man helped raise. They had at least two sons, Obedience Robins II and John, and a daughter who married Captain William Andrews. Their daughter Mary Robins became the second wife of wealthy merchant and Captain John Savage, who served as a Northampton burgess in 1665-1670. Savage died in 1678 (with several children and grandchildren by his first wife as well as at least an unnamed girl by his second wife) and Mary remarried William Cordrey but later was noted as of unsound mind. Savage's father Thomas Savage was an interpreter of Indian languages at Jamestown, and his son bought a land dispute between his tenants and Indians to court in 1674.

== Death ==
Robbins died in late 1662. His final words giving his widow a life estate, naming his stepson Major William Waters and son-in-law Captain William Andrews to help his widow settle his estate with creditors and heirs were transcribed by Major Waters and presented to the Northampton County probate court on December 30, 1662. His son Obedience Robbins II inherited the 900 acre plantation. His other son, John Robins (mid-1630s-c. 1709) would strongly support Governor Berkeley during Bacon's Rebellion, and continued their father's political tradition by serving as the Northampton County sheriff in 1677, and as burgess for Northampton County in 1691-1692. He married Esther Littleton and had sons Obedience II, John, Edward, Thomas and Littleton, and daughters Esther, Grace and Elizabeth).

== Ancestry ==
Ancestors of Obedience Robbins

8. Richard Robins
4. Thomas Robins
2. Richard Robins
10. Thomas Palmer
5. Elizabeth Palmer
1. Colonel Obedience Robins
24. John Goodman
12. Thomas Goodman
25. Agnes ---
6. Edward Goodman
13. Joan Fowler
3. Dorothy Goodman
14. John Rushall
7. Mary Rushall
15. Margery Patching
