= Vincent Thomas (mayor) =

American businessman and politician (1922–2015)

163rd Mayor of Norfolk, Virginia
- In office July 7, 1976 – July 3, 1984
- Preceded by: Irvine B. Hill
- Succeeded by: Joseph Leafe

Personal details
- Born: Vincent Johns Thomas; September 20, 1922 Norfolk, Virginia
- Died: November 7, 2015 (aged 93) Norfolk, Virginia
- Spouse: Elizabeth Carroll Thomas
- Education: Virginia Military Institute

Vincent Johns Thomas (September 20, 1922 – November 7, 2015) was an American businessman and politician who served as the Mayor of Norfolk, Virginia, from 1976 to 1984. He also served as the chairman of the Virginia State Board of Education from 1975 to 1978.

== Biography ==
Thomas, who was born in Norfolk to Minnie Allison Thomas and Vincent Graves Thomas on September 20, 1922, was a lifelong resident of the city. He graduated from Maury High School in 1939. In 1943, Thomas received a degree in electrical engineering from the Virginia Military Institute.

In 1960, the Norfolk City Council appointed him to the city's school board. He became chairman of the Norfolk from 1962 to 1972, when he was appointed to the statewide Virginia State Board of Education. In 1971, the Norfolk Public School system began busing students to schools across the city to fulfill a school desegregation initiative which had been ordered by the courts. Speaking at a rally in opposition to the busing, Thomas, who was chairman of the Norfolk School Board, pledged to keep his children in public schools and urged other parents to support the desegregation busing plan. One month later, Thomas published a 17-page press release. In his statement, Thomas called the busing initiative a failure, lamenting the flight of white families and students to the suburbs, "I was greatly disturbed that the so-called solution to Norfolk's problem resulted in the loss of about 20 percent of our white children."

Thomas then served as the chairman of the Virginia State Board of Education from 1975 to 1978.

Thomas won election to the Norfolk City Council in 1976, as part of a group of candidates backed by Norfolk's business leaders. The city council also elected the Norfolk's mayor at the time. The city council elected Thomas as the new mayor in 1976 by a 4–3 margin on the 27th ballot. He was re-elected as mayor by the city council for three additional term, each unopposed from 1976 to 1984. Thomas supported the construction of the Waterside development, as well as the downtown revitalization efforts.

Mayor Vincent Thomas held a meeting with the Rev. Jesse Jackson in 1983 to discuss Norfolk's controversial school busing plan. The busing program was discontinued in 1986.

Thomas actively supported the candidacy's of Norfolk's second African-American city council member. He declined to seek re-election in 1984. Shortly after his decision not to seek re-election, Thomas called for an increase in African-American representation in the city government.

Vincent Thomas died at the Harbor's Edge retirement community in Norfolk on November 7, 2015, at the age of 93.
