= Thomas Newton Jr. (mayor) =

American politician

- Portrait by John Durand, c. 1770

Member of the Virginia Senate
- In office 1797–1804

Member of the Virginia House of Burgesses
- In office 1766–1796

Mayor of Norfolk, Virginia
- In office 1794–1794
- Preceded by: Robert Taylor
- Succeeded by: James Ramsay

Mayor of Norfolk, Virginia
- In office 1792–1793
- Preceded by: Cary H. Hansford
- Succeeded by: Robert Taylor

Mayor of Norfolk, Virginia
- In office 1786–1787
- Preceded by: Cary H. Hansford
- Succeeded by: Benjamin Pollard

Mayor of Norfolk, Virginia
- In office 1780–1781
- Preceded by: George Abyvon
- Succeeded by: Paul Loyall

Personal details
- Born: May 15, 1742 Norfolk, Virginia
- Died: September 11, 1807 (aged 65)

Thomas Newton Jr. (May 15, 1742 – September 11, 1807) was an American politician who served as a member of the Virginia Senate, the Virginia House of Burgesses, and as mayor of Norfolk, Virginia.

== Biography ==
Newton was born on May 15, 1742 in Norfolk, the son of Thomas Newton who served as mayor of Norfolk (1747–1748).

In 1766, he was elected a member of the Virginia House of Burgesses representing Norfolk County. In June 1780, he was elected as mayor of Norfolk, Virginia; he served until June 1781. He again served as mayor of Norfolk from June 1786 to June 1787; June 1792 to April 1793; and from April 1794 to June 1794. In 1797, he was elected to the Virginia Senate where he served until 1804.

He died on September 11, 1807. His son was Thomas Newton Jr. (who also signed his name as "Junior"), U.S. representative.

== See also ==
- List of members of the Virginia House of Burgesses
