= Henry Seawell =

Colony of Virginia politician (c.1610–1644)

Member of the House of Burgesses for Lower Norfolk County
- In office 1639–1640 Serving with John Hill, John Sibsey, John Sidney
- Preceded by: John Sipsey
- Succeeded by: Edward Windham

Member of the House of Burgesses for the Upper Parish of Elizabeth City County
- In office 1632 Serving with John Sipsey and Thomas Willowby
- Preceded by: William Kempe
- Succeeded by: Thomas Sheppard

Personal details
- Born: c. 1610
- Died: 1644 Colony of Virginia

Henry Seawell (alternatively spelled Sewell) (c. 1610 – c. 1644) was an English merchant who became a landowner and politician in the Colony of Virginia and thrice served in the House of Burgesses.

== Career ==
Voters in the then vast upper (or westernmost) parish of Elizabeth City first elected Henry Seawell as one of the men representing them in the House of Burgesses in 1632. After the creation of lower Norfolk County he won election in 1639 and re-election the following year. In 1641 the governor and his council decided to have a parish church built at Sewell's Point, and the county justices convened occasionally at this man's home. In 1642, while this man was one of the justices of the peace, Elizabeth Mills accused Sewell's wife Alice as a thief, was found guilty of defamation, and was forced to apologize as well as received 10 lashes.

== Personal life ==
His relationship with the 18 year old English servant named Thomas Seawell (Saywell, Seywell) who emigrated to Virginia aboard the Tiger in 1623 is unclear. Two years later Thomas Seawell was working for ancient planter Reynold Booth in Elizabeth City County, and in 1635 he patented 400 acres on his own (and for importing people). Henry Seawell married a woman named Alice and both had died by February 14, 1645. They were survived by a son, Henry Seawell Jr. (1639–1672) and a daughter Anne Seawell (born c. 1634). In 1650, Anne married Lemuel Mason, also a member of the House of Burgesses, and their son (this man's grandson) Thomas Mason also served as a burgess.

== Death and legacy ==
Seawell died probably in late 1644, before his son reached legal age. His son died in 1672 without issue. Meanwhile, the parish church was moved in 1660 to near the new fort constructed for protection during the Anglo-Dutch Wars. However, Sewell's Point remains named for this man.

Family of Henry Seawell

Henry Seawell	Alice
Henry Seawell Jr.	Anne Seawell	Lemuel Mason	William Kendall
Thomas Mason	Anne Mason	William Kendall II
William Kendall III

== See also ==
- Molly Elliot Seawell
