= Edmund Scarborough =

English-born American politician (1617–1671)

- Coat of arms

Speaker of the Virginia House of Burgesses
- In office 1645–1646
- Preceded by: Edward Hill Sr.
- Succeeded by: Ambrose Harmer

Member of the House of Burgesses for Accomack County
- In office 1666–1670 Serving with Hugh Yeo
- Preceded by: Devereaux Browne
- Succeeded by: Southey Littleton

Member of the House of Burgesses for Northampton County
- In office 1660–Mar.1662 Serving with John Stringer, William Waters
- Preceded by: William Jones
- Succeeded by: William Andrews
- In office 1656–1657 Serving with Peter Walker
- Preceded by: Thomas Johnson
- Succeeded by: William Kendall
- In office 1647–1652 Serving with Anthony Hoskins, Stephen Charlton, William Jones, Thomas Johnson, Obedience Robbins
- Preceded by: Edward Douglas
- Succeeded by: Obedience Robbins
- In office 1645–1646 Serving with Stephen Charlton, Thomas Johnson
- Preceded by: Obedience Robbins
- Succeeded by: Edward Douglas
- In office 1643–1644 Serving with Philip Taylor
- Preceded by: Obedience Robbins
- Succeeded by: Obedience Robbins

Personal details
- Born: September 1617 England
- Died: 1671 Virginia
- Resting place: Hedra Cottage, Accomack County, Virginia
- Spouse: Mary Jones
- Occupation: Farmer, sea captain, military officer, merchant, surveyor, politician

Captain Edmund Scarborough (September 1617 – 1671) was a controversial English-born merchant, planter, sea captain, politician and military officer who served as speaker of the Virginia House of Burgesses from 1645 to 1646, and represented the Eastern Shore of Virginia during most of the last two decades of his life. Although his father of the same name also served as a burgess, as did another man in 1723-1726, he was the most ruthless and powerful of the three, at one time owning a quarter of land on Virginia's Eastern Shore as well as a considerable shipping fleet based in Boston, Massachusetts and trading with Angola. Scarborough's main residence, then known as "Occahannock House" referencing a now-silted creek and cove once known as "Scarborough Gut", is now on the National Register of Historic Places as Scarborough House Archaeological Site with its centuries old replacement now known as "Hedra Cottage".

== Early life and family ==
Scarborough was born in England, and baptized at St Martin-in-the-Fields on October 2, 1617 of the same year. His father, Captain Edmund Scarborough, was an army officer, barrister and graduate of Gonville and Caius College, Cambridge who immigrated to the English colony of Virginia. Edmund Sr. settled on the Eastern Shore of Virginia with his family around 1628 or 1629, and represented the Accomac Shire in the Virginia General Assembly in the early 1630's.

A brother, Sir Charles Scarborough, remained in England and studied medicine before becoming a noted mathematician who was a founding member of the Royal Society. A Royalist, he served as physician to Kings Charles II and James II after the Stuart Restoration.

== Career ==
=== Planter and merchant ===
Scarborough was one of the most prominent of the English settlers in Accomac Shire of the Virginia colony, in what is now the Eastern Shore of Virginia. The land on which his main residence, Occahannock House was constructed, was acquired on this man's behalf when he was a seven year old boy. In November 1634, Scarborough repatented land on Maggoty Bay claimed by his father for transporting his wife, son and a servant to the colony, and began claiming land in his own right.

In 1653, Scarborough was barred from public office and asked to leave the Virginia colony because of his strident Royalist sympathies, whereupon he departed after leasing 3000 acres patented in the names of his sons and four ships to William Bunton of Boston, the lease expiring in 14 years when Edmund Jr. was to come of age. In 1654 he and John Walton invested in 3,900 acres called "Peckincke" in Westmoreland County on behalf of John Bagnall of London.

Scarborough was a merchant whose ethics many questioned. Beginning in 1660, he also operated salt works at Occahonnock House and at Gargaphia nearer Maryland, but had not achieved the volume the legislator required for a bonus by 1666. Scarborough also had a fleet of ships traded with other colonies, including buying enslaved people from Angola in New York and transporting them south for resale. By December 1662, Scarborough owned slaves at Occahonnock House and also employed a tanner, four shoemakers (in June but nine in December) and two coopers. During the First Anglo-Dutch War, one of Scarborough's ships was seized en route to other colonies for trade. He retaliated by seizing a Prussian ship of similar size, although it was not of Dutch ownership. In 1652, Scarborough sold his seven ships (Deliverance, Mayflower, King David, Sea Horse, Holly Horse, Ann Clear, and Artillery) to William Burton of Boston.

Trained as a lawyer, Scarborough gained a reputation for ruthlessness by incidents such as that involving Anthony Johnson, a free black man. In 1657, Scarborough forged a letter in which Johnson, although illiterate, acknowledged a debt. Johnson could not contest the case; nevertheless, the court awarded Scarborough 100 acres (40 ha) of Johnson’s land to pay off his alleged "debt".

=== Military officer ===
Scarborough served as an officer of the local militia (militia service being required of all white males in the era).

On April 28, 1651, Scarborough led about fifty men on a raid, on a nearby Pocomoke village along the northern boundary of Accomac Shire, after convincing the settlers that the Indians planned to attack. At least one historian doubts the veracity of his story and suggested that he may have invented the story in order to raise enough men for the attack on the village. After the settlers captured some of the villagers and bound two of them in chains, the Indians massed along the border, and it was believed they were about to launch an attack on Virginian settlements. In May all the men involved in the action were called to appear in court in James City County, including Ambrose Dixon, to account for their actions. Scarborough was exonerated, however, when the court found that his raid had been justified by the circumstances. In 1659 he led 300 men in a raid on the Assoteague native people, with the support of the governor and legislature.

Scarborough employed natives to herd his livestock while at the same time selling guns to them and condemning them in the General Assembly for obtaining firearms. A familiar tradition on the Eastern Shore holds that he once called local Indians to a great feast where he reported the Great Spirit would speak to them. The Indians dared not disobey, and when they assembled Scarborough fired on them from an artillery piece hidden nearby. This most likely took place in Northampton County in 1671, and was Scarborough's way of eliminating and dispersing local tribes, as well as consolidating his power in both Accomack and Northampton counties.

By 1663, after his main rival Obedience Robbins had died, Scarborough had become an enemy of Accomack County's Quakers, including Ambrose Dixon. Some Quakers moved to Maryland where they were offered more religious freedom. In October 1663, Scarborough led Virginia cavalry into Maryland's section of the Eastern shore, where he railed against Quakers and other dissenters and claimed land as Surveyor-General of the Virginia Colony. Near the end of his career, Scarborough helped survey the border between the Eastern Shore of Maryland and the Eastern Shore of Virginia, creating what was called the Calvert-Scarborough Line, moving it substantially northwards to keep his own holdings within Virginia.

=== Politician ===
Scarborough held local offices on the Eastern shore, including as a justice of the peace (the justices jointly also governing counties in that era) beginning in 1633, and sheriff of Northampton County (1660 and 1661).

He began his nearly two decades of colony-wide public life in 1643, when Scarborough became one of the two men representing Northampton County in the House of Burgesses. Since unlike the previous assembly, when both burgesses represented Accomack County, in effect Scarborough and Philip Taylor represented Virginia's Eastern Shore, and Accomack County would not separately send burgesses to the assembly until 1661. However, Scarborough did not serve in every session of the House of Burgesses during those decades, but in several years either he was disqualified or Northampton voters instead elected two or more other men (including 1644, 1646 and 1653–55 and 1658-1659), and following a legal action brought by Governor Berkeley based on complaints Scarborough had murdered local Native Americans and taken away their children, Scarborough was convicted at trial before the General Court in Jamestown and barred from holding government offices for a few years.

Scarborough's main political adversary on the Eastern Shore became Colonel Obedience Robbins (from Northamptonshire, England), and later Robbins' stepson William Waters and son-in-law William Andrews. Supposedly, legislators with the governor's approval created two counties because the two arch rivals did not wish to live in the same municipality; hence, Northampton (named after Robbins' native area in England) and Accomack Counties. On several occasions Robbins also served as a burgess with Scarborough and sought to nullify any attempts by his nemesis to cause trouble on the Eastern Shore, whether it be with local Indians or governments. Although other men represented Northampton County in the sessions held in 1644, fellow burgesses elected Scarborough as Speaker of the House of Burgesses in 1645 and he served as a burgess most years until his death in 1671.

== Personal life ==
He married Mary who bore 3 sons (Charles, Edmond and Littleton) and two daughters. Their son Charles Scarborough would continue the family tradition of public involvement and served as a burgess. One daughter married Devereaux Browne, who was named sole administrator of his father-in-law's large estate until Virginia's General Court intervened and named him as joint-administrator with this man's son Charles and other son-in-law John West. Scarborough's daughter Matilda (who became a prominent Quaker) married John West (who may have received 250 acres as her dowry and owned 3600 acres in Accomac County in 1704, the year after her husband's death) and survived West by 16 years, dying in 1720. Her husband was the son of ship's surgeon Anthony West who also emigrated to the Virginia colony from Middlesex in England (and founded the West family, one of the First Families of Virginia) and John West's sole sister, Katherine, married his wife's brother Charles Scarborough. Complicating matters, besides the alternate spellings of the surname, are date discrepancies probably due to multiple generations of men of the same name, as one source claimed Scarborough's eldest son allegedly drowned as an adult in the York River on September 21, 1739. An even later Edmond Scarburgh or Scarborough was the son of Americus Scarburgh (1723-1774)and his wife Comfort West and grandson of Mitchell Scarburgh and the former Dorothy Wainhouse.

Scarborough also maintained a Swedish-born mistress named Ann Toft (1643–1687), who also bore three children (all daughters). Ann lived in Accomack from at least 1660 as a femme sole and was probably the wealthiest woman in Accomack due to her association with Scarborough. Scarborough set Toft up in business at a plantation known as Gargaphia on present day Gargathy Neck in northern Accomack County (seaside). This 1,200 acres (4.9 km^{2}) of land was transferred from Scarborough to her in Feb. 1664 when Ann was 21. Gargaphia, as it was known, shows up on many maritime maps of the time and would have been a convenient stopping point for sailors and a good embarkation point for Scarborough's many products and crops. Ann married Daniel Jenifer soon after Scarborough's death in 1671.

== Later life and death ==
Scarborough died of smallpox in 1671 and was buried on his plantation, but legend claims his friends removed his gravestone to keep his enemies from desecrating his remains. A modern grave marker has been placed on the grounds.

Scarborough died without a will and with heavy debts, his main house having been owned by his son Edmund Scarborough Jr. (d. 1712) since 1649 to shield it from creditors, and at least four succeeding generations also named a son Edmund, although Occahannock house passed from one of those men (a childless resident of York County) in 1752 to a relative named William Scarborough. In the early 19th century, now-historic Hedra Cottage was built by William M.K. Scarborough.

His son Charles Scarborough would continue the family's political and planter traditions by serving in both house of the Virginia General Assembly, although Governor William Berkeley at one time placed him as one of those exempt from pardons after Bacon's Rebellion in 1676, and Governor Francis Howard considered him insufficiently wealthy to be on the Governor's Council.
