= Irvine B. Hill =

American politician

162nd Mayor of Norfolk, Virginia
- In office September 3, 1974 – July 6, 1976
- Preceded by: Roy Martin
- Succeeded by: Vincent Thomas

Personal details
- Born: July 2, 1927 Norfolk, Virginia
- Died: May 27, 2015 (aged 87) Norfolk, Virginia
- Spouse: Elizabeth Stewart Hill

Irvine Byrd "Irv" Hill was an American politician and broadcasting executive who served as the mayor of the city of Norfolk from 1974 to 1976.

== Early life ==
Hill was born in Norfolk, Virginia to Madeline C. Hill and Herman R. Hill. He attended Maury High School, graduating from there in 1945. He then went on to attend the College of William and Mary. He later studied management at Harvard University's School of Business.

== Military career ==
Hill served in the Virginia National Guard from 1958 to 1962. He also served in the United States Navy Reserve.

== Political career ==
Hill served as a member of the city council from September 1, 1972 until August 30, 1976. He also served as the mayor of Norfolk, Virginia from 1974 to 1976 where he was nicknamed "The People's Mayor". In 2014, he was renominated to serve as a member of the Lake Taylor Hospital Community Board by Mayor Paul Fraim.

== Business career ==
In addition to his community service roles, he served as a television and radio executive. He sold commercial placements for WTAR radio. He later served as station manager for WCMS radio. Then he worked for Cox Communications.

== Personal life ==
He was married to Elizabeth Stewart Hill for 51 years. He later married Marjorie Batty Dey Hill.

== Awards ==
He was received the Distinguished Service Medal as Norfolk's First Citizen in 2000.
