= Joseph D. Wood =

American politician

156th Mayor of Norfolk, Virginia
- In office September 1, 1940 – August 31, 1944
- Preceded by: John A. Gurkin
- Succeeded by: James W. Reed

Personal details
- Born: Joseph Downing Wood; February 22, 1867; Washington County, North Carolina, U.S.
- Died: April 16, 1959 (aged 92); Norfolk, Virginia, U.S.
- Spouse: Ada Estelle Burnell (m. 1896)

Military service
- Allegiance: United States
- Branch/service: United States Navy
- Rank: Commander
- Unit: U.S. Naval Reserve
- Battles/wars: World War I

Joseph Downing Wood (February 22, 1867 – April 16, 1959) was an American businessman and politician who served on the Norfolk, Virginia city council. First elected to the council in 1926, he was president of the council and mayor of the city from 1940 until his resignation in 1944.

He was married to Ada Estelle Burnell on June 2, 1896.
