= Roy Martin (politician) =

American politician

Mayor Roy B. Martin Jr

161st Mayor of Norfolk, Virginia
- In office 1962–1974
- Preceded by: W. Fred Duckworth
- Succeeded by: Irvine B. Hill

31st President of the United States Conference of Mayors
- In office 1973–1974
- Preceded by: Louie Welch
- Succeeded by: Joseph Alioto

Norfolk City Councilor
- In office 1953–1962

Personal details
- Born: May 13, 1921 Norfolk, Virginia
- Died: May 20, 2002 (aged 81) Norfolk, Virginia
- Party: Democratic Party
- Spouse: Louise Eggleston Martin
- Children: Son, Daughter
- Education: University of Virginia; College of William & Mary

Military service
- Branch/service: United States Navy

Roy Martin was an American politician who served as mayor of Norfolk, Virginia from 1962 to 1974. A Democrat, he was renown for his support of racial integration and served as the 31st President of the United States Conference of Mayors from 1973 to 1974.

== Early life ==
Martin attended high school at Maury High School and graduated in 1939. Martin attended the Norfolk division of the College of William & Mary from 1939 to 1940, before it transitioned into Old Dominion University. He then attended the University of Virginia where he received a Bachelor's degree in commerce. After college Martin served in the Navy during World War II. Upon the conclusion of the war he returned to Norfolk to run a food brokerage business.

== Political career ==
=== City Council ===
Martin was appointed to the city council by Mayor W. Fred Duckworth in 1953, becoming the city's youngest councilor. During his first year in office, there was talk among the city council to transition the Norfolk division of William and Mary into a four-year institution. However, despite support from Mayor Duckworth, the city council rejected the prospect due to fear that they would be left covering the cost of the institution without state funding. Nine years later in 1962, this proposed transition was revisited and passed with the division becoming the Old Dominion University.

In 1959, during the Massive resistance movement all white schools in the city where shut down to prevent racial integration. The city council then held a vote to additionally shut down all black schools, Martin was the sole dissenting vote on the city council voting to keep the schools open.

=== Mayor of Norfolk ===
Martin succeeded Duckworth as mayor in 1962. During his tenure he helped create the Chrysler Museum of Art and the MacArthur Memorial as well as green lighting the creation of a new arena and recreation development. Martin served as the 31st President of the United States Conference of Mayors from 1973 to 1974.

=== Retirement ===
Martin retired from the mayoralty and the city council in 1974 upon the completion of his term as President of the United States Conference of Mayors. However, he remained active and participated in several local boards and was the city's goodwill ambassador. He was also commander of the American Legion Post No. 300.

== Personal life ==
Martin was married to Louise Eggleston Martin and the couple had a son and a daughter. Martin died in 2002 at the age of 81 after a battle with cancer.
