= Ambrose Dixon =

American Quaker pioneer

Ambrose Dixon (c.1619 – April 12, 1687) was an early American Quaker pioneer who was born in England and emigrated to America at an early age where he lived in the Virginia Colony before moving to Maryland.

== Background ==
Dixon married Mary, the widow of Henry Peddington, between July 4, and October 28, 1647. It has been stated that her maiden name was Wilson.

In 1651, Dixon joined Colonel Edmund Scarburgh and others in riding against the Indians in defiance of the law. A Court Order of 10 May 1651 says:

Whereas Mr Edmund Scarburgh, Mr. Thomas Johnson, Mr Richard Vaughan, Captain John Dollinge, John Robinson, Toby Norton, Richard Baily, Ambrose Dixon, Richard Hill, Jenkin Price And divers others Inhabitants and free men in the Upper parte of the parish in the Countie of Northampton Did in a Hostile manner (contrary to the knowne Lawes of Virginia And the League made with the Indians) upon the 28th day of Aprill last past Rayse a partie of men to the number of fiftie persons with Armes and ammunicon And upon the aforesaid daie marched amonge the Indians with a Resolucon to take or kill the Queene of Pocamoke, shott att Indians, slashed and cut [can't read], Took Indyans prisoner, And bound one of them with a Chayne, which said Accons caused the Indyans To Invade the Countie, to the great danger of our Lives and Estate, It is therefore ordered That the Sherriff shall forthwith Arrest the Bodies of all the abovesaid parties And such other (upon inquiry) as hee shall have notice of (which went out against the indyans upon their Designe) To the Number of 50 persons and that hee keepe them in his custodie until they enter into bonds to make their personal appearance at James Citty to answer the premisses before the Governor and Council upon th XXIth day of this Instant Moneth (att the suite of our Sovereign King).

He was a Quaker and had moved to Somerset County, Maryland, by January 4, 1663, to escape religious persecution. His home became the first Quaker meeting house in Maryland.

On January 4, 1666, he was appointed Surveyor for Highways. He was elected on March 3, 1671, he was elected a delegate in the Maryland Assembly representing Annemessex, Maryland. He never attended.

He died in 1687 at his plantation, Dixon's Choice. He is the immigrant ancestor to thousands of Americans including the Indiana blacksmith Noah Beauchamp who murdered his neighbor in the 1840s.
