= Miles King =

American politician (1747–1814)

Miles King (November 2, 1747 – June 19, 1814) was an American merchant, mayor, and member of the Virginia House of Delegates.

King was born in 1747. He served on coastal patrols in Virginia during the American Revolution. He was a member of the Virginia house of delegates from Elizabeth City County in 1777–1778 and from 1784–1798. He was a member of the Virginia Ratifying Convention that ratified the federal Constitution in 1788. In 1798 he resigned from the House of Delegates to become clerk of his county's court. He served as mayor of Norfolk for four terms (1804–1805, 1809–1810, 1811–1812, 1813–1814).
