= Jane Jackson Thompson =

American enslaved person (c.1719–after 1792)

- Born: Jane Tucker c. 1719; United States
- Died: 1792 or after Likely Nova Scotia, Canada
- Other name: Jenny
- Occupations: Slave, then housewife
- Known for: Black Loyalist and Matriarch of Nova Scotian Settlers

Jane Jackson Thompson (also Thomson) (c. 1719–after 1792) was an enslaved person who lived with her common-law husband, Talbot Thompson, until he was able to purchase her freedom in 1769. Talbot was a successful sailmaker who provided Jane and their family with a comfortable life.

They became Black Loyalists during the American Revolutionary War after all of their property was burned down in 1776. Her children and their families became loyalists and joined the British between 1775 and 1780. Her children were with several interconnected enslavers, mainly from the Norfolk, Virginia area. Under Lord Dunmore's proclamation of 1775, Jane and her family members were loyal to the British and attained or maintained their freedom under the British.

She came to Nova Scotia in 1783 when she was between 60 and 70. Her descendants lived in Birchtown and other towns in Nova Scotia. She was the matriarch of Nova Scotian Settlers who relocated to Sierra Leone in 1792.

== Early and personal life ==
Jane Thompson, also known as Jenny, and her mother Sabina were enslaved by John Tucker, who came with his brother to Virginia from the Caribbean about the turn of the 18th century. Her father may have been a man named "Old Joe" Tucker. In 1735, they were the only two women on Tucker's slave list. At that time, Jane was about 16 and was born in 1719. John Tucker died in 1737, and she was inherited by his nephew, Colonel Robert Tucker. Robert also inherited John's mercantile empire. Jane lived enslaved in Norfolk, Virginia. (Note: In at least one source she was said to have been born free, but that could not be true because her children were not born free and she does not appear in the Norfolk Tithables as a free person.) She was recorded on Tucker's tithable list in 1750 and called Old Jenny, worth five pounds in 1767.

== Marriage and children ==
By 1737, when she was about 18, she had several small children. Her children included: Betty and King Tucker; James, Edward, and John Jackson; and James and Samuel Thompson. They were in the records for Black Loyalists who moved to Nova Scotia.

She had several children with the Jackson surname who also went to Nova Scotia. She married Talbot Thompson, who bought his freedom in 1761 and earned his living making sails. They lived together for several years, even though Robert Tucker enslaved her. After Robert Tucker's death, Talbot purchased her freedom at the sale of Tucker's estate; the manumission was formalized on June 14, 1769. Tucker's son said she provided "fidelity, extraordinary Services, and constant Obedience" to the Tuckers. Talbot Thompson was on the same tithables list as Robert Tucker. She may have had two or more children with Talbot, such as Samuel Thompson and James Thompson.

Talbot Thompson was a successful sailmaker in Norfolk with several staff and apprentices. Jane and her husband bought a large property that included a main two-story house, smaller houses, a garden, and orchards just before Christmas in 1770. It had a dairy, piggery, and stables. They became interested in Methodism, likely inspired in 1772 by traveling preachers Joseph Pilmore or Robert Williams. They participated in racially diverse religious meetings in houses of people in the maritime businesses. One of the attendees was his client, Andrew Sprowle, who controlled business for the Royal Navy.

== American Revolutionary War ==
During the American Revolutionary War, son James Jackson, identified as formerly enslaved by Robert Tucker, was recruited by Lord Dunmore, governor of the Colony of Virginia about 1775 to be a pilot for the Royal Navy. He was under Captain Henry Mowat and served on the ship London. Lord Dunmore proclaimed on November 14, 1775, that all blacks—whether enslaved, free or indentured—would be freed if they served the British during the war.

Talbot and Jane defected to Lord Dunbar by January 1776 when a fire in Norfolk destroyed all of Talbot's property. Talbot ran away in December 1775, after Norfolk was destroyed and joined the British. (Note: At least one other source said she ran away in 1777.) Jane joined Lord Dunmore in January 1776. Dunmore seized Tucker's Point in February and occupied the land and the mill there until May 1776, during which time Grace Thompson, Jane's daughter-in-law and Samuel Thompson's wife, was with Jane and Talbot Thompson at Tucker's Point. Grace embarked on the Dunluce on May 21, 1776, but at some point returned to Norfolk and ran away again with two girls in 1779.

James Jackson's adult son, London Jackson, whom William Ballad of Hampton had enslaved, joined the British under Mowatt in late 1780. James and London Jackson were awarded land on Nutt Island (perhaps McNutts Island) for their service. Son John Jackson, served the British General Leslie in Hampton in late 1780. He was enslaved by Anthony Walke, who was an associate of Robert Tucker.

Talbot died in 1782 in New York. Jane filed a claim to the Loyalist Claims Commission for destroying their property in Norfolk in January 1776. The British rejected her nine-page claim.

== Nova Scotia ==
A Black Loyalist, Jane traveled to Nova Scotia on the L'Abondance. She was described as being worn out, about 70 years of age, and formerly the property of Thomas Newton of Norfolk. She traveled with her five-year-old grandchild. She travelled with Hannah Jackson, her daughter-in-law, and Robert and Peter Jackson, her grandchildren. They lived together in Birchtown. Son John and his wife Nancy sailed on the same ship to Nova Scotia as Jane. In the Birchtown Muster of 1784, John was 41 (born about 1743), and Nancy was 32. Betty Tucker, listed on the Birchtown Muster next to Jane's name, may have been Jane's daughter. Grace Thompson, a widow, and her two daughters are likely the daughter-in-law and granddaughters of Jane. They were enslaved by Edward Thruston, Robert Tucker's uncle. She traveled on the same ship as James Thompson, enslaved by Edward Cooper of Hampton, and is believed to be Jane's son. Grace and James lived near each other in Birchtown.

In 1791, most of her family members relocated to Sierra Leone. She remained in Nova Scotia, where in 1792, she was listed as destitute.

== Family information ==
Family members of Jane Jackson Thompson
Name	Relationship	Enslaver	Became a Black Loyalist	Ship to Nova Scotia	Comments
Jane Jackson Thompson	Mother	John Tucker, then Robert Tucker	Became a loyalist about January 1776	L'Abondance for Port Rosey	Lived in Birchtown with daughter-in-law Hannah and grandsons Talbot Thompson purchased her freedom in 1769 at the estate sale of Robert Tucker.
Robert Tucker	Father of Tucker children	N/A	N/A	N/A	Slave owner who died in or before 1769.
Betty Tucker	Daughter, Wife of James	Joanna Tucker	Ran 1776	Unknown ship	Betty, born 1735 to 1755, more likely closer to 1735. If there are two Bettys, one 28 and the other 48, the younger Betty is Jane's granddaughter.
James Tucker	Son-in-law	Capt John Phrip	Ran 1776	Ranger for Port Mattoon	James, also called Jemmy, born about 1728, seemed to have run away on his own and served the Royal Artillery Department. He was described in the Book of Negroes as "almost worn out". He may have died or gone away for work by the 1784 Birchtown Muster.
King Tucker	Son	Robert Tucker	May 1775	Ranger for Port Mattoon	King, born about 1732, married to Dianah Tucker, served the Royal Artillery Department, and died in 1783 or 1784, by the time of the Birchtown Muster in 1784.
Frank Jackson	Father of Jackson children	Robert Tucker	late 1775	N/A	Frank, also called Francis, Jackson is believed to be the father of Edward (Ned) Jackson.
James Jackson	Son	Robert Tucker	1775 Recruited as a pilot for Lord Dunmore	London to Port Rosey	Born about 1733, James was married to Judith. Traveling to Nova Scotia with him were his second wife Judith, their son Harry, London from an earlier marriage, his wife Sebro, and their daughter Zelpher. Captain Henry Mowat spoke for the entire family. Nelly Jackson, born about 1750, appears to be a sister-in-law. He may have also had a son named James, who Richard Swepston enslaved. Members of James family (born about 1733) were awarded land grants on Nutt Island (perhaps McNutts Island, Nova Scotia not far from Birchtown).
John Jackson	Son	Joanna Tucker, wife of Robert, then Anthony Walker [Walke]	Ran about 1780	Clinton for Annapolis Royal	Born about 1743 to 1757, ran away about the same time as London and James Jackson. Walke purchased several people that Tucker enslaved in about 1774.
Hannah Jackson	Daughter-in-law	Thomas Newton, Robert Tucker's son-in-law	Left in 1776	L'Abondance for Port Rosey	Hannah (born between 1734 and 1743) and her two sons, Robert and Peter, lived with Jane. She relocated with her sons to Sierra Leone.
Edward Jackson	Son, likely Husband of Hannah	Robert Tucker	Late 1775	N/A	Also known as Ned, he was a seaman who was part of Lord Dunmore's fleet in May 1776. Frank Jackson, an older man, was also on Tucker's tithables, ran away about the same time, and was with Dunmore's fleet. Edward is presumed to have died during the 1776 smallpox epidemic. Frank, or Francis, may have been his father.
Talbot Thompson	Husband of Jane, Father of Thompson children	Free sailmaker	Joined the British in December 1775	N/A	He bought his freedom in 1761, which was formalized on November 3, 1761. He died in New York in 1782.
Samuel Thompson	Son, Husband of Grace Thompson	Cornelius Calvert	1776	N/A	Samuel, born about 1753, was a sawyer, or lumberman, and a millwright at Deep Creek. He may have had an informal arrangement for his freedom. He was listed as a free black man just above his father in the records for taxable heads of households in Norfolk in 1773. Presumed dead by 1783.
Grace Thompson	Daughter-in-law, Wife of Samuel Thompson	Edward Thruston, the brother-in-law of Robert Tucker, then Elizabeth Thruston	Ran away 1776, 1779	L'Abondance for Port Rosey	Grace, born before 1755 or about 1759, traveled with Isabella, born about 1769, and another child, Lydia, born about 1774, who was not in the Birchtown Muster list. Grace's brother is Timothy Snowball, who is believed to be the father of Maria Snowball. She lived with James Thompson and his wife.
James Thompson	Son	Cornelius Calvert	Ran away 1780	L'Abondance for Port Rosey	Born about 1758, he had a wife and a child, Maria Snowball
