= John Hutchings (politician) =

American politician

Member of the Virginia House of Burgesses
- In office 1738–1755

Mayor of Norfolk, Virginia
- In office 1755–1755
- Preceded by: George Abyvon
- Succeeded by: Richard Kelsick

Mayor of Norfolk, Virginia
- In office 1743–1744
- Preceded by: George Newton
- Succeeded by: John Taylor

Mayor of Norfolk, Virginia
- In office 1737–1738
- Preceded by: George Newton
- Succeeded by: Robert Tucker

Personal details
- Born: 1691 Norfolk County
- Died: April 1768 (aged 76–77)
- Spouse: Amey Godfrey
- Children: 7

John Hutchings (1691 – April 1768) was an American merchant and politician who served as a member of the Virginia House of Burgesses and thrice as the mayor of Norfolk, Virginia.

== Biography ==
Hutchings was born in 1691, the son of Daniel Hutchings, a mariner from Norfolk County. His grandfather, John Hutchings, was from Bermuda. Hutchings worked as a merchant.

Hutchins was elected the third mayor of Norfolk on June 24, 1737 serving one term until June 1738. In 1738, he was elected to the Virginia House of Burgesses representing Norfolk Borough at the second session of the Assembly which convened on November 1, 1738; he served until 1755. He was elected again as mayor on June 24, 1743 serving an additional one year term through June 1744. He served as mayor for a third time to complete the unfinished term of George Abyvon from February 1755 to June 1755.

== Personal life ==
Hutchings was married to Amey Godfrey, the daughter of John Godfrey; they had seven children:

- John Hutchings Jr., member of the House of Burgesses representing Norfolk Borough;
- Joseph Hutchings, member of the House of Burgesses representing Norfolk Borough;
- Elizabeth, married to Richard Kelsick, later mayor of Norfolk;
- Mary, married to Dr. John Ramsay, surgeon in the Revolutionary Army;
- Amy, married to Thomas Newton, later mayor of Norfolk;
- Francis, married to Charles Thomas, later mayor of Norfolk; and
- Susanna, married to Edward Champion Travis, member of the House of Burgesses.

Hutchings died in April 1768.

== See also ==
- List of members of the Virginia House of Burgesses
