= Robert Tucker (burgess 1753) =

American burgess (died 1767)

Colonel Robert Tucker

Member of the Virginia House of Burgesses from Norfolk
- In office 1753–1755

Mayor of Norfolk, Virginia
- In office 1759–1760
- Preceded by: John Tucker
- Succeeded by: Wilson Newton

Mayor of Norfolk, Virginia
- In office 1748–1749
- Preceded by: John Tucker
- Succeeded by: Durham Hall

Mayor of Norfolk, Virginia
- In office 1738–1739
- Preceded by: John Hutchings
- Succeeded by: John Taylor

Personal details
- Born: Robert Tucker
- Died: 1767
- Spouse: Joanna Corbin
- Occupation: Mariner, politician, businessman

Colonel Robert Tucker was a member of the House of Burgesses who represented Norfolk County, Virginia, a mariner, and a slave owner. His father, mother and uncle, from the Caribbean, had an extensive mercantile trade and a number of ships that sailed throughout Chesapeake Bay and the Caribbean. In 1737, Robert Tucker inherited the mercantile empire and slaves that were crew members on ships. He was active in politics from the time that Norfolk, Virginia was established as a town. He became the first alderman and was a mayor three times. His role as alderman, a lifetime role, gave him a lot of power to determine how business would be conducted. Tucker also ran a mill and bakehouse.

== Early life ==
Robert Tucker was the son of Francis Courtenay and Robert Tucker of Barbados, (Note: Robert's grandfather may have been George Tucker (died 1662) of Southampton Parish, Bermuda, who had sons Robert, John, and St. George, who died in 1710.) who was a "very extensive merchant" who died in 1737. His brother and close associate was John Tucker. His uncle was Edward Thruston. After his father's death, his mother married Thomas Nelson of Yorktown, Virginia.

== Marriage and children ==
On May 17, 1739, he married Joanna Corbin, the daughter of Martha and Gowin Corbin of King and Queen County, Virginia. His brothers-in-law were Richard Corbin and Jacob Walker. He had nine children with Joanna, including: Robert, born in 1741 and was a burgess from 1765 to 1769, died unmarried after September 19, 1779; Gawin, fate unknown; Ann, unmarried in 1779; Joanna, who married her cousin Gawin Corbin of Buckingham House; Sarah, who married John Taylor; Martha, married Thomas Newton Jr.; Courtney married Preeson Bowdoin and Joseph Hutchins; and Martha married Thomas Newton Jr.

Tucker was a father of 21 children.

== Slaveholder ==
Robert's uncle, John Tucker of the Caribbean, came to Virginia about the turn of the 18th century. He brought with him a slave named Sabina. In 1735, he had two women slaves, Sabina and her daughter Jane, also known as Jenny, and at about 16 years of age, on his list of slaves. Jane had several children by 1737. John Tucker died in 1737 and Robert inherited his mercantile empire and slaves. (Note: Jane Jackson Thompson was the matriarch of a number of children, seven of whom became Black Loyalists and served Lord Dunmore beginning in 1776. Her children had the surnames of Tucker, Jackson, and Thompson. One son, James Jackson, had been a slave of Robert Tucker and was recruited to be a pilot in the Royal Navy for Lord Dunmore. Her children and in-laws were either slaves of Robert Tucker, or slaves of his close associates. Jane was manumitted in 1769 by her husband, Talbot Thompson, with whom she lived before and after her manumission.)

His slaves were primarily men who worked the maritime trade, including pilots, skippers, and crewmen—as well has men who maintain his ships, like coopers and caulkers. The ships conducted trade throughout the Chesapeake Bay area and into the Caribbean. Known for their skills, the black men had a great deal of freedom, some were masters of ships with crews of other black men. Some of the men were intended to be freed though John Tucker's will, but a manumission law of 1723 no longer allowed slaves to be freed through wills. It is likely that Robert Tucker treated them as if they were free. One of the men was called "Old Joe" and was likely Jane's father or brother.

== Career ==
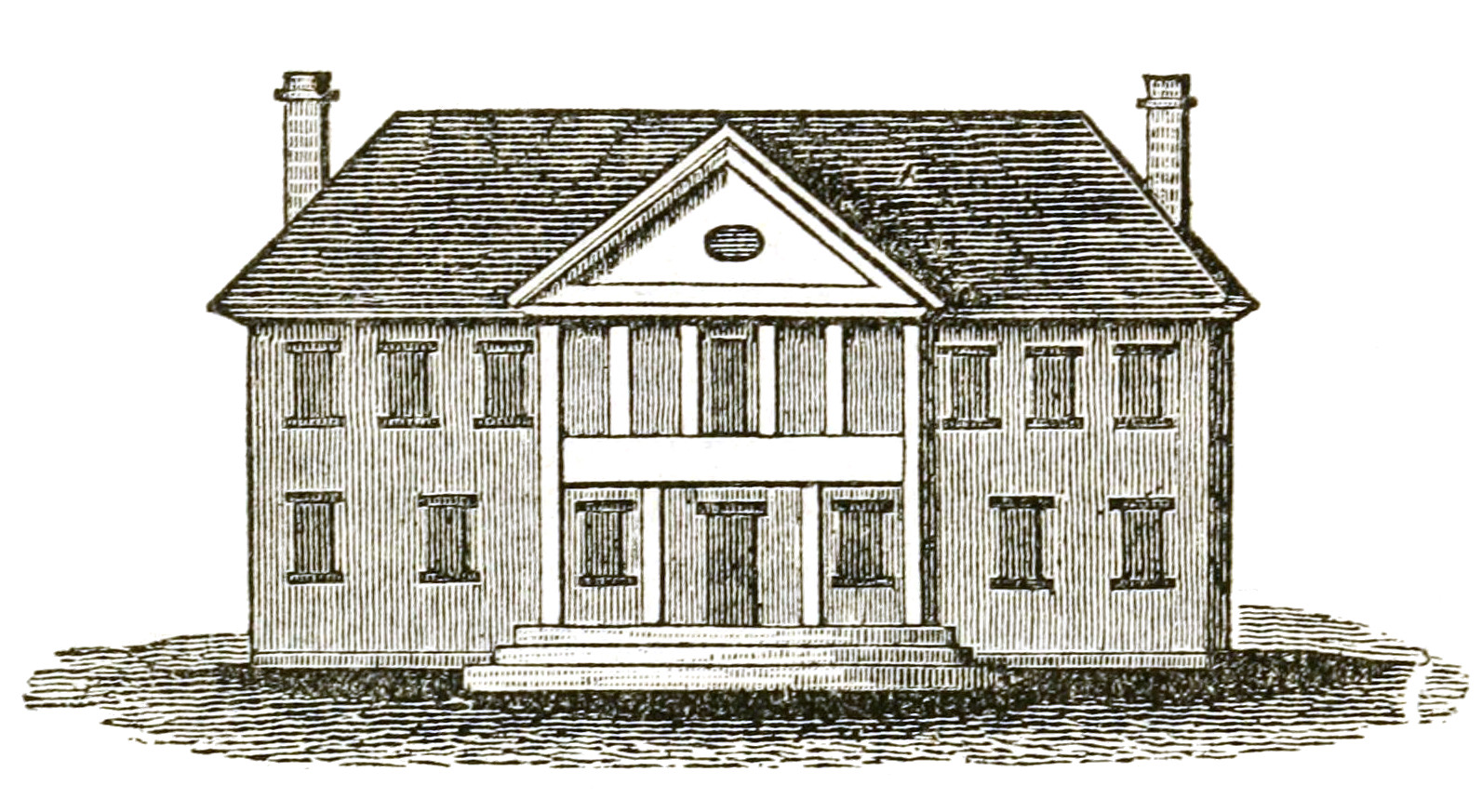
Second Capitol at Williamsburg (viewed from Duke of Gloucester Street), where the House of Burgesses met.

Norfolk was established in 1736 and Tucker was the first alderman of Norfolk, beginning September 25, 1736. He was alderman for life and gave him great power in the business and political arena. He served as mayor in 1738, 1749, and 1759. His brother John also served as mayor. Tucker was a member of the House of Burgesses from Norfolk from 1753 to 1755, when he resigned to become a sheriff. Called Colonel Robert Tucker, he was made county lieutenant on March 20, 1760. In 1766, he and his son signed the Sons of Liberty resolution, in opposition to the Stamp Act 1765.

He was a merchant, mariner and businessman, owning a bakehouse and a mill at Tuckers Point. He was a slaveholder, with 20 slaves for his shipping business and 16 for personal use.

In addition to his brother, Thomas Nelson Sr. and John Phrip were close associates. He was one of the founders, along with George Washington, of the Great Dismal Swamp Company. Tucker had 3,000 acres of swamp land that he hoped would become usable if drained.

== Death ==
In 1767, Tucker died. His estate was settled by 1770. Although he was a large slaveholder, only some of his slaves were inherited by his wife and son. After his death, and during the American Revolutionary War, Lord Dunmore established a camp at Tuckers Point in May 1776. There were 25 slaves who ran away and joined the British during the Revolutionary War, many of whom died during a smallpox epidemic.
