= Baylor Hill =

American soldier and diarist (c. 1760–1804)

Baylor Hill (c. 1760–1804) was an American cavalry Captain who served in the American Revolutionary War. He kept a daily diary between 1777 and 1781 that described his experiences during the conflict and with several prominent historical figures of his time. He later served as mayor of Norfolk, Virginia.

== Birth ==
Hill was born in about 1760 at his family's home Hillsborough in King and Queen County, Virginia. He was the son of Colonel Humphrey Hill and Frances Baylor.

== American revolutionary war diaries ==
Most of what is known about Hill's service during the American Revolution is recorded in the daily diary he kept. A three-volume book about the diary titled A Gentleman of Fortune – The Diary of Baylor Hill - 1st Continental Light Dragoons 1777-1781 was published in October 2002 by the late John T. Hayes, editor of The Saddlebag Press. A Gentleman of Fortune contains a transcript of the surviving entries in the diary as well as extensive notes and additional commentary including correspondence and expense records kept by Hill. The actual diary is part of the R. A Brock Collection at the Huntington Library in San Marino, California.

Hill was commissioned as a cornet in his home state of Virginia on December 4, 1776. Under the command of Colonel Theodorick Bland, Hill was immediately sent north to join George Washington's army. The first surviving entry in the diary is dated Wednesday, January 29, 1777, where Hill reports he was in Morristown, New Jersey. The final diary entry is dated Thursday, January 18, 1781. Hill had been a British POW at Haddrell's Point in Mount Pleasant, South Carolina since being captured on Saturday, May 6, 1780. If Hill kept a diary for 1778, it is currently unknown.

Hill's diary entries during this four-year period offer a look into the daily life of a young cavalry officer. While much of the diary could be seen as routine, Hill writes about being at times in the immediate company of prominent figures such as George Washington, Casimir Pulaski, Benjamin Lincoln, Nathanael Greene, Lord Stirling, and Charles Henri Hector, comte d'Estaing.

=== Notable diary entries ===
Below are several of the most notable entries from Hill's diary:

- Wednesday, February 26, 1777 – "This day I with 9 of our Troop had the pleasure of ascorting His Excellency Gen Washington down to Chatham, dined with him and retd to Morris Town with him that night."
- Tuesday, March 11, 1777 – "At Bearskin Ridge all day this day I had the honour of dining wth Lord Stirling, Gen Green, Gen Lincon and Sundry other Gen Officers."
- Friday, September 17, 1779 – “After breakfast I with several of the officers with a party our Regt. Escorted Gen Lincoln & Count D’Estang down about twelve miles from Head Quarters where a part of the French army was encamp’t, and after viewing the Enemy’s Breastworks & forts we returned to our Quarters.”
- Thursday, September 30, 1779 – “At our quarters till evening when we had orders for one third of each Regimt to parade I had the Comd of the party wch consisted of fifty men march’t at Sun Set to the French camp where I was met by Gen. Pulaski who took the command.”

== Military service ==
Hill served in both the Northern Theater and Southern Theater of the American Revolutionary War. He was involved in several engagements including the Battle of Germantown, the Battle of Monck's Corner, and the Battle of Lenud's Ferry, where he was captured by the British.

== Later life and death ==
After the American Revolution, Hill settled in Norfolk, Virginia, where he served as mayor in 1798. Hill is thought to have died in 1804.

== See also ==
- Continental Army
- List of American Revolutionary War battles
- Patriot (American Revolution)
- Timeline of the American Revolution
