= Maximillian Boush =

American colonial politician

Maximilian Boush

Member of the Virginia House of Burgesses
- In office 1710–1726

Maximilian Boush or Maximillian Boush was an American politician who served as a member of the Virginia House of Burgesses.

== Biography ==
Boush was the second generation of the Boush family which arrived in Virginia in 1670, one of the early merchant families in Virginia. He received an education in law and served as Queen's and King's Counsel for the counties of Norfolk, Princess Anne, and Nansemond. He served as member of the Virginia House of Burgesses (1710–1726) representing Princess Anne County, Virginia.

== Personal life ==
He was married to Sarah Woodhouse, granddaughter of Henry Woodhouse, the governor of Bermuda. His son, Samuel Boush served as the first mayor of Norfolk, Virginia. His grandson Samuel Boush II (who was referred to as "Samuel Boush the elder" after his father's death and as "Samuel Boush Sr." after his son began using the honorific "junior") served in the Virginia House of Burgesses from 1728 until 1747 as did his great grandson, Samuel Boush III (usually referred to as "Samuel Bush Jr.") who served from 1752-1754.

== See also ==
- List of members of the Virginia House of Burgesses
