= Charles Scarborough =

English physician and mathematician

Sir Charles Scarborough

Sir Charles Scarborough or Scarburgh MP FRS FRCP (29 December 1615 – 26 February 1694) was an English physician and mathematician.

== Upbringing ==
Scarborough was born in St. Martin's-in-the-Fields, Westminster, in 1615, to Edmund Scarburgh and his wife Hannah (Colonel Edmund Scarburgh, prominent Virginia colonist, was his brother), and was educated at St Paul's School, Gonville and Caius College, Cambridge (BA, 1637, MA, 1640) and Merton College, Oxford (MD, 1646). While at Oxford he was a student of William Harvey, and the two would become close friends. Scarborough was also tutor to Christopher Wren, who was his assistant for a time.

== Royal physician ==
Following the Restoration in 1660, Scarborough was appointed physician to Charles II, who knighted him in 1669; Scarborough attended the king on his deathbed, and was later physician to James II and William and Mary. During the reign of James II, Scarborough served (from 1685 to 1687) as Member of Parliament for Camelford in Cornwall.

== Merits ==
Scarborough was an original fellow of the Royal Society. As a fellow of the Royal College of Physicians, the author of a treatise on anatomy, Syllabus Musculorum, which was used for many years as a textbook, and a translator and commentator on the first six books of Euclid's Elements, published in 1705. He also appeared as the subject of a poem by Abraham Cowley.

Scarborough died in London on 26 February 1694 and was buried at Cranford, Middlesex. St Dunstan's Church there has a monument to him in Latin and English (as "Scarburgh"), erected by his widow.
