= Christ and St. Luke's Church =

Historic church in Virginia, United States

- U.S. National Register of Historic Places
- U.S. Historic district – Contributing property
- Virginia Landmarks Register
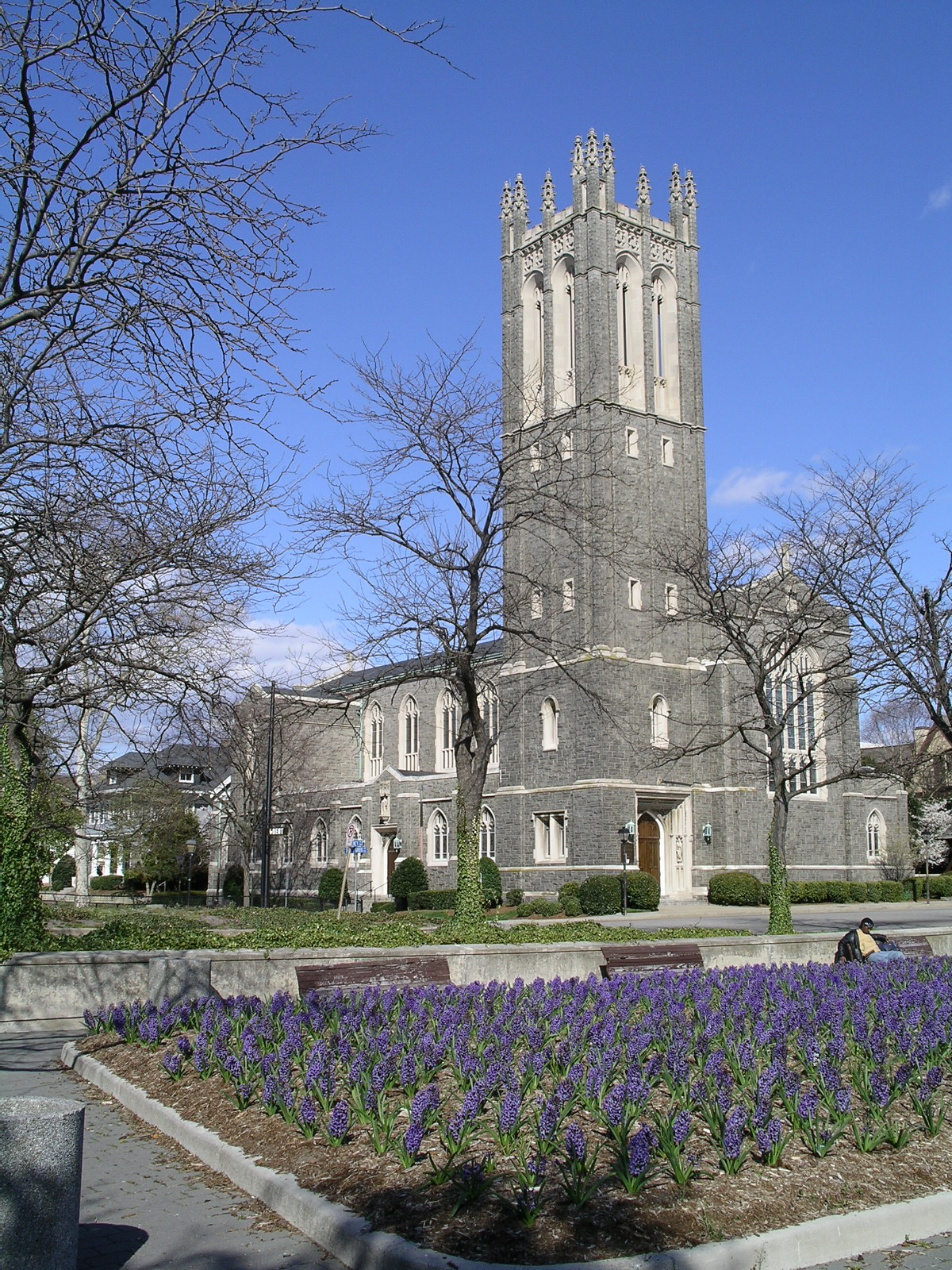
- Christ and St. Luke's Church, April 2004

- Location within Virginia Location within the United States
- Location: 560 W. Olney Rd., Norfolk, Virginia
- Coordinates: 36°51′35″N 76°17′54″W
- Area: 1.5 acres (0.61 ha)
- Built: 1909-1910
- Architect: Watson & Huckle
- Architectural style: English Perpendicular Gothic
- Part of: North Ghent Historic District (ID01000693)
- NRHP reference No.: 79003286
- VLR No.: 122-0075

Significant dates
- Added to NRHP: June 18, 1979
- Designated CP: July 11, 2001
- Designated VLR: March 20, 1979

Christ and St. Luke's Church is a historic Episcopal church located at Norfolk, Virginia. It was built in 1909–1910, and is a long, narrow building of rough-faced random ashlar in the English Perpendicular Gothic Revival style. It features a tall, four-stage corner tower crowned with battlements and pinnacles.

It was listed on the National Register of Historic Places in 1979. It is located in the North Ghent Historic District.
