= Walton R. L. Taylor =

American politician

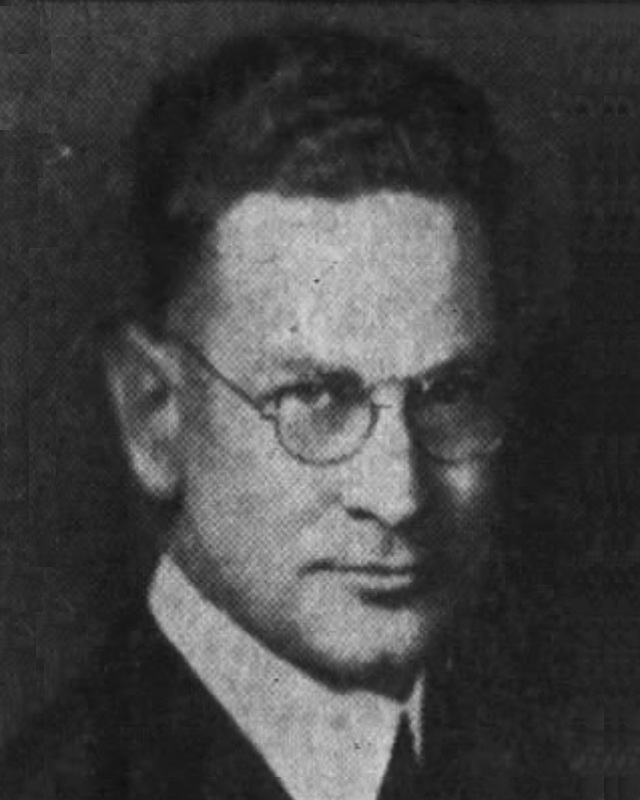

154th Mayor of Norfolk, Virginia
- In office January 1, 1934 – August 31, 1938
- Preceded by: Samuel L. Slover
- Succeeded by: John A. Gurkin

Personal details
- Born: Walton Robert Lawson Taylor; December 28, 1886; Windsor, Virginia, U.S.
- Died: March 22, 1941 (aged 54); Norfolk, Virginia, U.S.
- Spouse: Mary Elizabeth Jackson
- Education: Washington and Lee University (LLB)

Walton Robert Lawson Taylor (December 28, 1886 – March 22, 1941) was an American attorney and politician who served on the Norfolk, Virginia city council. He retired in 1938, after being displaced as president of the council and mayor of the city by John A. Gurkin.
