= William Kendall Jr. =

American colonial politician (1659-1696)

William Kendall Jr. (II)

Member of the Virginia House of Burgesses for Northampton County, Colony of Virginia
- In office 1692-1693 Serving with John Custis
- Preceded by: John Robins
- Succeeded by: William Waters
- In office 1688 Serving with Thomas Harmanson
- Preceded by: Isaac Foxcroft
- Succeeded by: John Robins

Personal details
- Born: 1659 Northampton County, Colony of Virginia
- Died: 1696 (aged 36–37) Northampton County, Colony of Virginia
- Spouse: Anne Mason
- Children: William Kendall III, John Kendall and 3 daughters
- Parents: William Kendall (father); Sarah Kendall (mother)
- Occupation: planter, politician

William Kendall Jr. (II) (1659–1696) was a planter and politician in the Colony of Virginia who twice represented Northampton County in the House of Burgesses as had his father.

== Early and family life ==
Kendall was born in 1659, probably in Northampton County, to Sarah, the second wife of merchant, planter and politician William Kendall.

== Career ==
When his father died in 1686, he became his father's primary heir, although his mother, married sister Mary (the wife of Hancock Lee) and her children also received property. In April 1692, Kendall patented 2,750 acres in nearby Accomack County, also on Virginia's Eastern Shore.

Northampton County voters twice elected Kendall as one of their representatives in the House of Burgesses, first in 1688 (although he failed to win re-election) and again for the 1692-1693 session.

== Personal life ==
He married Anne Mason, daughter of Lemuel Mason, also a member of the House of Burgesses. Together they had sons William Kendall III and John Kendall, and three daughters.

== Death and legacy ==
Kendall made his will on January 29, 1695, and it was proved July 28, 1696.

Family of William Kendall Jr.

Henry Seawell	Alice
Anne Seawell	Lemuel Mason	William Kendall
Thomas Mason	Anne Mason	William Kendall II
William Kendall III
