= Samuel Boush Jr. =

American politician

Member of the Virginia House of Burgesses
- In office 1752–1754

Samuel Boush Jr. (Also referred to as Samuel Boush III) was an American politician and civic leader who served as a member of the Virginia House of Burgesses from 1752-1754.

== Family ==
Born in Norfolk, Virginia in 1696, Boush was the son of Samuel Boush II, a member of the House of Burgesses. His grandfather was Norfolk's first mayor, Samuel Boush I, who was appointed Norfolk's first mayor in 1736 but died shortly after taking office. His Great-grandfather, Maximillian Boush, was an early member of the Virginia House of Burgesses.

== Career ==
Boush would serve in the House of Burgesses representing Norfolk County in the from 1752-1754.

See also

- List of members of the Virginia House of Burgesses
