= List of mayors of Norfolk, Virginia =

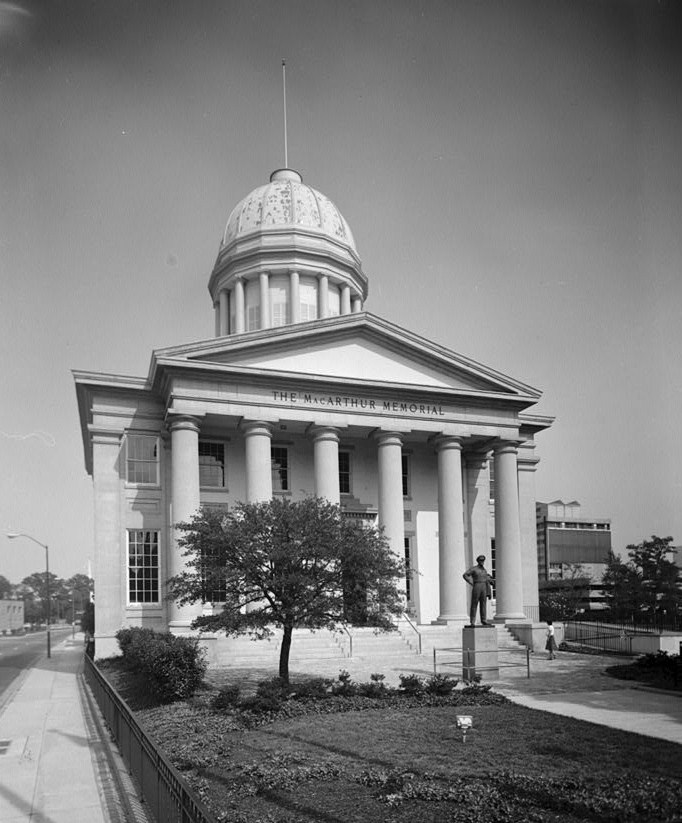
Norfolk City Hall (photo 1981)

The following is a list of mayors of Norfolk, Virginia, USA:

== List of mayors ==
=== 1736–1788 ===
Number	Image	Mayor	Years	Notes
1		Samuel Boush †	Sep 15, 1736 – Nov 1736	First mayor Died 2 months after taking office. Son of Maximillian Boush, member of the Virginia House of Burgesses. Father of Samuel Boush II and grandfather of Samuel Boush III who both served in the Virginia House of Burgesses.
2		George Newton	Nov 18, 1736 – Jun 1736	Elected by the City Council to serve out the term of mayor Boush. Served seven months
3		John Hutchings	Jun 24, 1737 – Jun 1738	Served one year
4		Robert Tucker	Jun 24, 1738 – Jun 1739	
5		John Taylor	Jun 25, 1739 – Jun 1740	
6		Samuel Smith	Jun 24, 1740 – Jun 1741	
7		Josiah Smith	Jun 21, 1741 – Jun 1742	
8		George Newton (2nd term)	Jun 24, 1742 – Jun 1743	
9		John Hutchings (2nd term)	Jun 24, 1743 – Jun 1744	
10		John Taylor (2nd term)	Jun 25, 1744 – Nov 1744	Served five months
11		John Phripp	Nov 14, 1744 – June 1746	Served nineteen months
12		Edward Pugh	Jun 24, 1746 – Jun 1747	
13		Thomas Newton	Jun 24, 1747 – Jun 1748	Father of Thomas Newton Jr.
14		John Tucker	Jun 24, 1748 – Jun 1749	
15		Robert Tucker (2nd term)	Jun 1749 – Jun 1750	
16		Durham Hall	Jun 1750 – Jan 1751	Served seven months
17		Wilson Newton	Jan 1751 – June 1752	Served seventeen months
18		Christopher Perkins	Jun 1752 – Mar 1753	Served nine months
19		Josiah Smith (2nd term)	Mar 1753 – Jun 1754	Served seventeen months
20		George Abyvon	Jun 24, 1754 – Feb 1755	Served eight months
21		John Hutchings (3rd term)	Feb 1755 – Jun 1755	Served four months
22		Richard Kelsick	Jun 1755 – Jun 1756	
23		Josiah Smith (3rd term)	Jun 1756 – Jun 1757	
24		John Phripp (2nd term)	Jun 1757 – Jun 1758	
25		John Tucker (2nd term)	Jun 1758 – Jun 1759	
26		Robert Tucker (3rd term)	Jun 1759 – Jun 1760	
27		Wilson Newton (2nd term)	Jun 1760 – Jun 1761	
28		Christopher Perkins (2nd term)	Jun 1761 – Jun 1762	
29		Paul Loyall	Jun 1762 – Jun 1763	
30		Archibald Campbell	Jun 1763 – Jun 1764	
31		Lewis Hansford	Jun 1764 – Jun 1765	
32		Maximillian Calvert	Jun 1765 – Jun 1766	
33		James Taylor	Jun 1766 – Jun 1767	
34		George Abyvon (2nd term)	Jun 1767 – Jun 1768	
35		Cornelius Calvert	Jun 1768 – Jun 1769	
36		Maximillian Calvert (2nd term)	Jun 1769 – Jun 1770	
37		Charles Thomas	Jun 1770 – Jun 1771	
38		George Abyvon (3rd term)	Jun 1771 – Jun 1772	
39		Paul Loyall (2nd term)	Jun 1772 – Jun 1773	
40		Charles Thomas (2nd term)	Jun 1773 – Jun 1774	
41		George Abyvon (4th term)	Jun 1774 – Jun 1775	
42		Paul Loyall (3rd term)	Jun 1775 – ?	
43		James Taylor (2nd term)	? – Jun 1778	
44		Cornelius Calvert	Jun 1778 – Jun 1779	
45		George Abyvon (5th term)	Jun 1779 – Jun 1780	
46		Thomas Newton Jr.	Jun 1780 – Nov 1781	Son of former mayor Thomas Newton. Father of Thomas Newton III (who also signed his name as Thomas Newton Jr.), U.S. representative. Served seventeen months
47		Paul Loyall (4th term)	Nov 1781 – Jun 1782	Served seven months
48		James Taylor (3rd term)	Jun 1782 – Jun 1783	
49		George Kelly	Jun 1783 – Jun 1784	
50		Robert Taylor	Jun 1784 – Jun 1785	Father of Robert B. Taylor
51		Cary H. Hansford	Jun 1785 – Jun 1786	
52		Thomas Newton Jr. (2nd term)	Jun 1786 – Jun 1787	
53		Benjamin Pollard	Jun 1787 – Jun 1788	
54		George Kelly (2nd term)	Jun 1788 – Jun 1789	

=== 1789–1832 ===
Number	Image	Mayor	Years	Notes
55		Robert Taylor (2nd term)	Jun 1789 – Jun 1790	
56		James Taylor (4th term)	Jun 1790 – Jun 1791	
57		John Boush	Jun 1791 – Oct 1791	Served four months
58		Cary H. Hansford (2nd term)	Jun 1791 – Oct 1791	Served eight months
59		Thomas Newton Jr. (third term)	Jun 1792 – Apr 1793	Served ten months
60		Robert Taylor (3rd term)	Apr 1793 – Apr 1794	
61		Thomas Newton Jr. (4th term)	Apr 1794 – Jun 1794	Served two months
62		James Ramsay	Jun 1794 – Jun 1795	
63		Seth Foster	Jun 1795 – Jun 1796	
64		Samuel Moseley	Jun 1796 – Jun 1797	
65		George Loyall	Jun 1797 – Jun 1798	
66		Baylor Hill	Jun 1798 – Jun 1799	
67		John K. Read	Jun 1799 – Jun 1800	
68		Seth Foster (2nd term)	Jun 1800 – Jun 1801	
69		John Cowper	Jun 1801 – Jun 1802	
70		William Vaughan	Jun 1802 – Jun 1803	
71		Thomas H. Parker	Jun 1803 – Jun 1804	
72		Miles King	Jun 1804 – Jun 1805	
73		Luke Wheeler	Jun 1805 – Jun 1806	
74		Thomas H. Parker (2nd term)	Jun 1806 – Jun 1807	
75		Richard E. Lee	Jun 1807 – Jun 1808	
76		John E. Holt	Jun 1808 – Jun 1809	
77		Miles King (2nd term)	Jun 1809 – Jun 1810	
78		William Boswell Lamb	Jun 1810 – Jun 1811	
79		Miles King (3rd term)	Jun 1811 – 1812	The registry lists a Miles King Jr. as mayor although this is likely an error as Miles King died in 1814 mirroring the registry.
80		William Boswell Lamb (2nd term)	Jun 1812 – Jun 1813	
81		Miles King † (4th term)	Jun 1813 – Jun 19, 1814	Died in office several days before his term ended on June 19, 1814
82		William Boswell Lamb (3rd term)	Jun 1814 – Jun 1815	
83		John E. Holt (2nd term)	Jun 1815 – Jun 1816	
84		William Boswell Lamb (4th term)	Jun 1816 – Feb 1817	Served eight months
85		John E. Holt (3rd term)	Feb 1817 – Jun 1817	Served 4 months and then resigned one day before his term expired making him eligible for re-election
86		James Taylor	Jun 23, 1817 – Jun 24, 1817	Served one day and resigned enabling John E. Holt to run for re-election
87		John E. Holt (4th term)	Jun 1817 – Jun 1818	Resigned one day before his term expired making him eligible for re-election
88		John Tabb	Jun 23, 1818 – Jun 24, 1818	Served one day and resigned enabling John E. Holt to run for re-election
89		John E. Holt (5th term)	Jun 24, 1818 – Jun 23, 1819	Resigned one day before his term expired making him eligible for re-election
90		Wright Southgate	Jun 23, 1819 – Jun 24, 1819	Served one dayand resigned enabling John E. Holt to run for re-election
91		John E. Holt (6th term)	Jun 24, 1819 – Jun 23, 1820	Resigned one day before his term expired making him eligible for re-election
92		Wright Southgate (2nd term)	Jun 23, 1820 – Jun 25, 1820	Served two days and resigned enabling John E. Holt to run for re-election
93		John E. Holt (7th term)	Jun 26, 1820 – Jun 1821	
94		George W. Camp	Jun 1821 – Jun 1821	Served three days and resigned enabling John E. Holt to run for re-election
95		John E. Holt (8th term)	Jun 27, 1821 – Jun 1822	
96		John Tabb (2nd term)	Jun 1822 – Jun 1822	Served four days and resigned enabling John E. Holt to run for re-election
97		John E. Holt (9th term)	Jun 1822 – Jun 1823	
98		William Boswell Lamb (5th term)	Jun 1823 – Jun 1823	Served a few days and resigned enabling John E. Holt to run for re-election
99		John E. Holt (10th term)	Jun 1823 – Jun 1824	
100		William A. Armistead	Jun 1824 – Jun 1824	Served a few days and resigned enabling John E. Holt to run for re-election
101		John E. Holt (11th term)	Jun 1824 – Jun 1825	
102		John Tabb (3rd term)	Jun 1825 – Jun 1825	Served three days and resigned enabling John E. Holt to run for re-election
103		John E. Holt (12th term)	Jun 1825 – Jun 1826	
104		Isaac Talbot	Jun 1826 – Jun 1826	Served five days and resigned enabling John E. Holt to run for re-election
105		John E. Holt (13th term)	Jun 1826 – Jun 1827	
106		Daniel C. Barraud	Jun 1827 – Jun 1827	Served three days and resigned enabling John E. Holt to run for re-election
107		John E. Holt (14th term)	Jun 1827 – Jun 1828	
108		George T. Kennon	Jun 1828 – Jun 1828	Served four days and resigned enabling John E. Holt to run for re-election
109		John E. Holt (15th term)	Jun 1828 – Jun 1829	
110		Thomas Williamson	Jun 1829 – Jun 1829	Served two days and resigned enabling John E. Holt to run for re-election
111		John E. Holt (16th term)	Jun 1829 – Jun 1830	
112		Giles B. Cook	Jun 1830 – Jun 1830	Served ten days and resigned enabling John E. Holt to run for re-election
113		John E. Holt (17th term)	Jun 1830 – Jun 1831	
114		Wright Southgate (3rd term)	Jun 1831 – Jun 1831	Served ten days and resigned enabling John E. Holt to run for re-election
115		John E. Holt (18th term)	Jun 1831 – Jun 1832	Served eleven months
116		John E. Holt † (19th term)	Jun 1832 – Oct 1832	No record of any intervening election Died in office on October 12, 1832

=== 1832–present ===
Number	Image	Mayor	Years	Notes
117		Miles King Jr.	Oct 1832 – Jun 1843	
118		W.D. Delaney	Jun 1843 – Jun 1851	
119		Simon S. Stubbs	Jun 1851 – Jun 1853	
120		Hunter Woodis	Jun 1853 – Jun 1854	
121		Simon S. Stubbs (2nd term)	Jun 1854 – Jun 1855	
122		Hunter Woodis † (2nd term)	Jun 1855 – Nov 1855	Died in office of yellow fever in the 1855 Norfolk yellow fever epidemic
x		N.C. Whitehead	Nov 1855	Acting mayor Stricken soon after by yellow fever
123		Ezra T. Summers	Nov 26, 1855 – Jun 1856	Served seven months
		Finlay F. Ferguson	–	
		William Wilson Lamb	1858–1863	
		William H. Brooks	1863–	
		James L. Belote	1864–	
		Thomas C. Tabb	–	
		John R. Ludlow	Jun 1866 – Mar 1868	Removed by federal authorities due to his service as a confederate soldier
		Francis DeCordy	May 1868 –	
		John B. Whitehead	1870–	
		John R. Ludlow (2nd term)	1872–1874	
		John S. Tucker	1876–1880	
		William Lamb	1880–1886	
		Barton Myers	1886–1888	
		Richard G. Banks	1888–1890	
		E.M. Henry	–	
		Frank Morris	–	
		S. Marx	–	
		A.B. Cooke	–	
		Charles W. Pettit	–	
		Wyndham R. Mayo	1896–1898	
		C. Brooks Johnston	1898–1901	
		Nathaniel Beaman	1901–	
		James Gregory Riddick	1901-1912	
		Wyndham R. Mayo (2nd term)	1912–1918	
		Albert L. Roper	1918–1924	
		S. Heth Tyler	1924–1932	
		E. Jeff Robertson	–	
		Phillip H. Mason	–	
		Samuel Leroy Slover	–	
		Walton R. L. Taylor	1934–1938	
		John A. Gurkin	1938–1940	
		Joseph D. Wood	1940–1944	
		James W. Reed	–	
		R.D. Cooke	–	
		Pretlow Darden	1949–1950	Younger brother of Colgate Darden, U.S. Congressman and Governor of Virginia
		W. Fred Duckworth	1950–1962	
		Roy Butler Martin	1962–1974	
		Irvine B. Hill	1974–1976	
		Vincent J. Thomas	1976–1984	
		Joseph A. Leafe	–	
		Mason Andrews	1992–1994	
		Paul D. Fraim	1994–2016	
		Kenneth Cooper Alexander	2016–Present	First African-American mayor

== See also ==
- Timeline of Norfolk, Virginia
- History of Norfolk, Virginia

== Bibliography ==
- William S. Forrest (1853). Historical and Descriptive Sketches of Norfolk and Vicinity. Philadelphia: Lindsay and Blakiston.
- H. W. Burton (1877). History of Norfolk, Virginia. Norfolk Virginian. p. 228-232 – via Internet Archive.
- "Mayors of Norfolk". Ordinances of the City of Norfolk, Va. Norfolk: Burke & Gregory. 1902.
