= North Ghent Historic District =

Historic district in Virginia, United States

- North Ghent
- U.S. National Register of Historic Places
- U.S. Historic district
- Virginia Landmarks Register
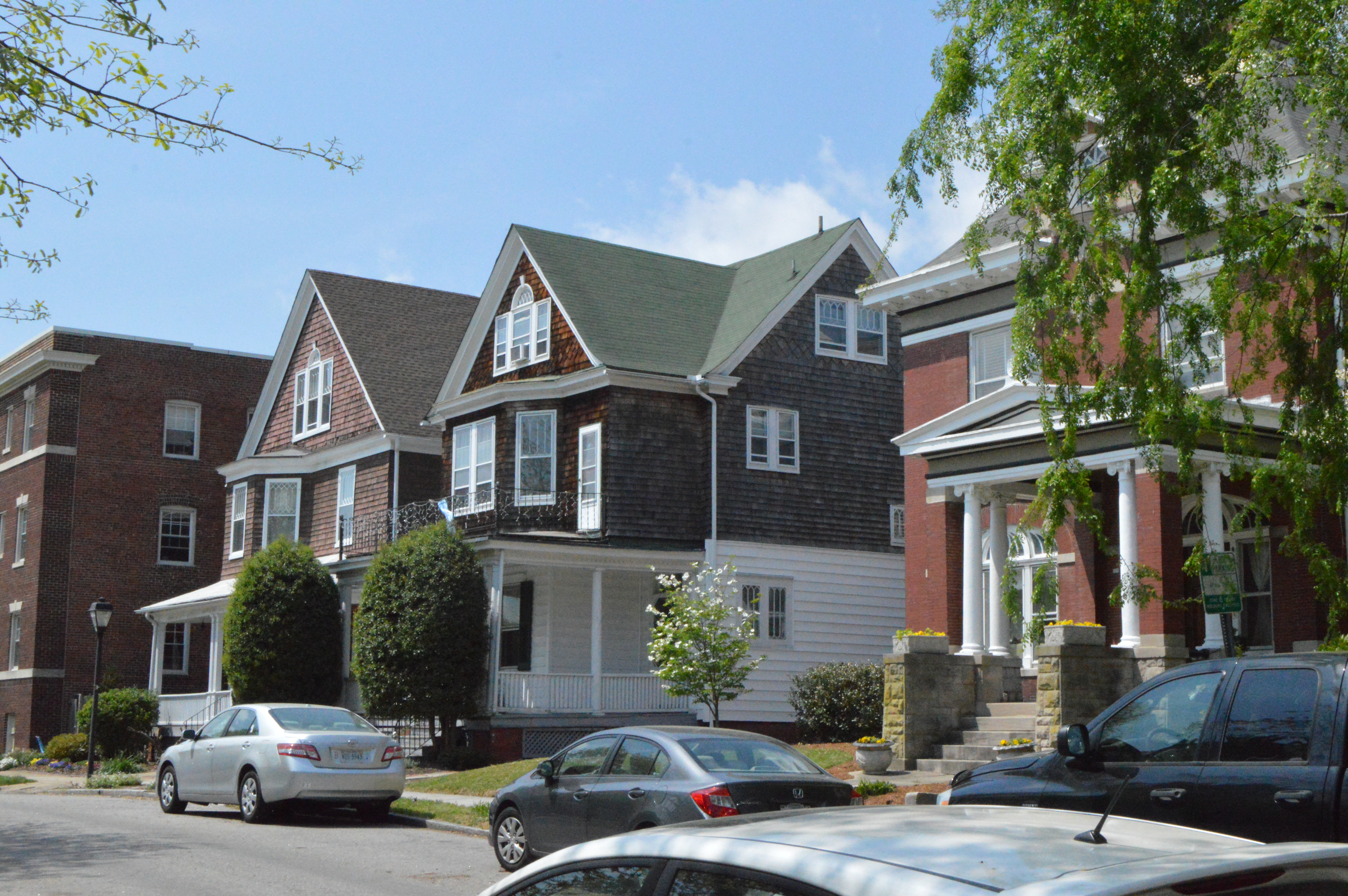
- Houses in Stockley Gardens

- Location within Virginia Location within the United States
- Location: Bounded by Princess Anne Rd., Olney Rd., Colonial Ave., and Colley Ave., Norfolk, Virginia
- Coordinates: 36°51′45″N 76°17′53″W
- Area: 80 acres (32 ha)
- Built: 1897
- Architect: John R. Graham, John Kevan, et al.
- Architectural style: Greek Revival, Queen Anne, et al.
- NRHP reference No.: 01000693
- VLR No.: 122-0827

Significant dates
- Added to NRHP: July 11, 2001
- Designated VLR: July 11, 2001

The North Ghent Historic District is a national historic district located at Norfolk, Virginia. It encompasses 322 contributing buildings in a primarily residential section of Norfolk. It developed primarily between 1897 and 1912 as a northward extension of Ghent. The neighborhood includes notable examples of a variety of architectural styles including the Greek Revival and Queen Anne styles. Notable non-residential buildings include the First Presbyterian Church, Ohef Sholom Temple, and Ghent Methodist Church (1921). Located in the district is the separately listed Christ and St. Luke's Church.

It was listed on the National Register of Historic Places in 2001.
