= William Kendall (burgess, born 1621) =

British merchant, planter, military officer and politician

Col. William Kendall

21st Speaker of the Virginia House of Burgesses
- In office 1685–1685
- Preceded by: Edward Hill Jr.
- Succeeded by: Arthur Allen II

Member of the Virginia House of Burgesses for Accomack County, Colony of Virginia
- In office 1685 Serving with Daniel Jenifer, William Anderson
- Preceded by: Charles Scarborough
- Succeeded by: Charles Scarborough

Member of the Virginia House of Burgesses for Northampton County, Colony of Virginia
- In office Nov. 1682-1684 Serving with Thomas Hunt
- Preceded by: William Waters
- Succeeded by: John Custis Sr.(II)
- In office 1663-1676 Serving with John Savage, William Andrews
- Preceded by: Edmund Scarborough
- Succeeded by: Isaac Foxcroft
- In office 1658 Serving with William Mellinge, William Michell, Randall Revell, John Wilcox
- Preceded by: Edmund Scarborough
- Succeeded by: William Jones

Personal details
- Born: 1621 Brinton, Norfolk, England
- Died: 1686 (aged 64–65)
- Spouse(s): Susanna Pott, Sarah
- Children: William Jr., Mary Kendall Lee
- Occupation: merchant, planter, politician

Military service
- Branch/service: Virginia militia
- Rank: Colonel

William Kendall Sr. (I) (1621-1686) was an English merchant, planter, military officer and politician who came to own considerable land on Virginia's Eastern Shore. He represented Northampton County several times before and after Bacon's Rebellion (in which he sided with the rebels), and during 1685 became the 21st Speaker of the Virginia House of Burgesses while representing Accomack County.

== Early life ==
Kendall was born in Brinton, Norfolk, England, in 1621. He was the seventh child of John Kendall, a taylor, and Anne Pleasance Kendall. In the early 1640s, he moved from Brinton to Yarmouth, England, and married a woman named Ruth in 1644. She died around 1649. Thus, Kenadall sailed to the Virginia colony as a widower.

Author John Ruston Pagan speculates Kendall sailed aboard the Peter and John to America in the summer of 1650.

== Career ==
In his last will and testament, Kendall considered himself a merchant. He purchased a 600 acre plantation in Northampton County in 1657, and during his lifetime patented (based on bringing emigrants to the colony), as well as bought and sold more than 12,000 acres on Virginia's eastern shore. He traded tobacco from the Virginia colony with the New Netherlands, and also came to operate a tannery. In 1666, he was taxed based on owning two enslaved people, as well as indentures on two seamen and nine other male servants.

By April 1657, Kendall was a justice of the peace in Northampton County, such justices jointly administering the county during that era. He also became the county's tax collector in 1660 and was active in the local Anglican parish. In 1678, after he had donated 1,000 pounds of tobacco to support the local parish, the vestry assigned him the uppermost pew on the east and over against the chancel.

He was considered "one of the foremost men of his time." He became Commissioner in 1667.

== Politics ==
In 1657 and 1662, Northampton County voters elected Kendall to represent them in the House of Burgesses, so he served in the Grand Assembly that lasted until 1676, although he had failed to win re-election in 1658, 1659 and 1660.

Kendall was not considered part of the "Green Spring Faction" that supported Gov. William Berkeley during Bacon's Rebellion in 1676. He and Charles Scarborough of Accomack County were found guilty of uttering "Scandalous & mutinous words Tending to the dishonor of the Right Honorable Governor" and Kendall was fined 50 pounds sterling. Thus he was one of the burgesses exempted from the general pardon suggested by royal advisors after Bacon's death in the fall of 1676 and which Berkeley issued the following February before departing to England. Instead, Thus, he did not serve in the assembly of 1677.

In 1679, he was sent with Col. Nathaniel Littleton to New York to discuss Indian affairs with Governor Edmund Andros.

In 1684, Northampton voters again elected Kendall as one of the burgesses representing them, but the following year he won election from neighboring Accomack County. When the assembly met that year, the five nominees for Speaker indicated factional alignments, with Thomas Ballard and Edward Hill Jr. being members of the Green Spring faction, William Fitzhugh considered an excellent lawyer and aligned with the Stuart cause but distrusted by some for his partnership with Catholic lawyer George Brent, who also owned property in the Northern Neck of Virginia. Kendall and Charles Scarborough were known to oppose Governor Effingham based on religion (both were firm Protestants and Effingham a Roman Catholic) as well as politics. In September 1685, fellow burgesses elected Kendall the 21st Speaker of the Virginia House of Burgesses. Three weeks later, on October 12, 1685, Governor Effingham issued a proclamation against "all Seditious Discourses", which some considered an attempt to end criticism of himself as well as King James II.

== Personal life and legacy ==
His will was dated December 29, 1685, and was proved on July 28, 1686. In it, "he names his son-in-law Hancock Lee and Mary, his wife, and son William Kendall." His son William was a member of the House of Burgesses for Northampton County as well, in 1688 and then 1692–1693. William II had two sons, named William III and John, and three daughters. Kendall's daughter Mary Kendall married Hancock Lee, another burgess and member of the First Families of Virginia.

Family of William Kendall (burgess, born 1621)

Henry Seawell	Alice
Anne Seawell	Lemuel Mason	William Kendall
Thomas Mason	Anne Mason	William Kendall II
William Kendall III
