= Samuel Boush Sr. =

American politician

Member of the Virginia House of Burgesses
- In office 1728–1747

Samuel Boush was an American politician who served as a member of the Virginia House of Burgesses.

== Biography ==
His father was also Samuel Boush, the first mayor of Norfolk, Virginia. His son was Samuel Boush Jr. who also served in the House of Burgesses (1752–1754). His grandfather was Maximilian Boush, early pioneer and also a member of the House of Burgesses (1710–1726).

== See also ==
- List of members of the Virginia House of Burgesses
