= Edmund Scarborough Sr. =

North American Colonial English merchant, planter and politician

Member of the House of Burgesses for Accomack County
- In office 1630–1633

Personal details
- Born: 1584 England
- Died: winter 1634/1635 Accomack County, Virginia colony
- Spouse: Hannah
- Relatives: Edmund Scarborough (son)
- Education: Cambridge University, Inns of Court
- Occupation: Planter, politician

Edmund Scarborough (or "Scarburgh") (1584 – circa 1634) was a former English army officer who emigrated to the Eastern Shore of Virginia where he became a planter and politician, representing what became Accomac County three times in the House of Burgesses. Thus the earliest of three men of the same name to serve in the Virginia General Assembly, Scarborough also served as a local justice of the peace.

== Early life ==
The son of Henry and Elizabeth Scarburgh of Walsham in Norfolk County in England was baptized on Christmas day, 1584. He attended Mr. Brigg's School in Norwich, then was admitted at Christ College of Cambridge University on April 15, 1602. He studied law, presumably at one of the Inns of Court, because his father's will required he remain until taking "the degree of a Barrester." After marrying Hannah, the young family lived in the Parish of St. Martin's in the Fields in Middlesex, where four children were baptized.

== Career ==
Scarborough settled in the Virginia colony about 1629, although undocumented family tradition claims he first visited in 1620 or 1621.

Accomack County voters elected Scarborough to represent them in the House of Burgesses alongside county clerk Henry Bagwell, Thomas Graves and Obedience Robins in the assembly of 1630. Voters also elected him and John Howe in the first of two assemblies held in 1632, but elected other men for the second assembly. Scarborough again won election in 1633 alongside John Howe, Roger Saunders and John Wilkinson.

== Death and legacy ==
Scarborough last appeared at the county court in April 1634, but died intestate which was admitted to probate in Accomack County on January 9, 1635, when Hannah Scarborough identified herself as his widow when selling cattle to Capt. Thomas Graves. By November of that year, his son and heir Edmund Scarborough (who would also serve as a burgess and as Speaker of the House of Burgesses) repatented some of his late father's land.
