= George Newton (Virginia politician) =

American politician

Member of the Virginia House of Burgesses
- In office 1710–1726

Mayor of Norfolk, Virginia
- In office 1736–1736
- Preceded by: Samuel Boush
- Succeeded by: John Hutchings

Mayor of Norfolk, Virginia
- In office 1742–1743
- Preceded by: Josiah Smith
- Succeeded by: John Hutchings

Personal details
- Born: England

George Newton was an American politician who served as a member of the Virginia House of Burgesses. Newton was educated in England before moving to Norfolk County where he served as high sheriff and as justice. In 1710, he was elected a member of the House of Burgesses representing Norfolk County. On Nov 18, 1736, he was selected to replace Samuel Boush as mayor of Norfolk, Virginia after Broush's death in office; he served until June 1736. On June 24, 1742, he again served as Mayor of Norfolk serving one term until June 1743.

== See also ==
- List of members of the Virginia House of Burgesses
