= Lower Norfolk County, Virginia =

Former county in Virginia, United States

Coordinates: 36°45′N 76°10′W

Lower Norfolk County is a long-extinct county which was organized in colonial Virginia, operating from 1637 until 1691.

New Norfolk County was formed in 1636 from Elizabeth City Shire, one of the eight original shires (or counties) formed in 1634 in the colony of Virginia by direction of the King of England. New Norfolk County included all the area in South Hampton Roads now incorporated in the five independent cities located there in modern times.

The following year, in 1637, it was divided into Upper Norfolk County and Lower Norfolk County. On October 20, 1673 the "Grand Assembly" at Jamestown authorized Lower Norfolk County to construct a fort. As settler population increased, in 1691 Lower Norfolk County was divided to form Norfolk and Princess Anne counties. These jurisdictions were maintained for centuries.

In 1963, after approval by referendum of the voters of the City of South Norfolk and of the rest of Norfolk County, and the Virginia General Assembly, these areas were combined and reorganized as a new independent city, ending the threat of additional annexations by the City of Norfolk. The new name selected by the voters was Chesapeake, and so, the new city of Chesapeake, Virginia was organized.

Also in 1963, after approval by referendum of the voters of the City of Virginia Beach and the rest of Princess Anne County, and the Virginia General Assembly, those two areas were consolidated as an independent city, taking the better-known name of Virginia Beach.

== See also ==
- New Norfolk County, Virginia (1636-1637)
- Nansemond County (1646-1972)
- Norfolk County (1691-1963)
- Princess Anne County (1691-1963)
- South Norfolk, Virginia (1919-1963)
- Norfolk, Virginia (1963-)
- Virginia Beach, Virginia (1963-)
