= John Ambler (Jamestown) =

Virginia politician (1762–1836)

Member of the Virginia House of Delegates representing James City County
- Succeeded by: William Browne
- In office Oct 21, 1793 - Nov. 9, 1795
- Preceded by: William Norvell

Personal details
- Born: September 25, 1762 Yorktown, Colony of Virginia
- Died: April 8, 1836 (aged 73) Richmond, Virginia
- Resting place: Shockoe Hill Cemetery, Richmond, Virginia
- Spouse(s): Frances Armistead; Lucy Marshall; Catherine Bousch Norton
- Relations: Jaquelin Ambler, John Ambler (uncles)
- Children: Edward Ambler II
- Parent(s): Edward Ambler, Mary Cary Ambler
- Occupation: planter, politician

Military service
- Branch/service: Virginia militia
- Rank: Colonel
- Unit: 19th Virginia
- Battles/wars: War of 1812

John Ambler (September 25, 1762 – April 8, 1836) was a Virginia planter, military officer and politician who represented James City County twice in the Virginia House of Delegates before he moved to Richmond, which he helped defend in the War of 1812. Several men of his family, including his English great-grandfather and uncle who represented Jamestown as a burgess but died during this boy's childhood were also named "John Ambler".

== Early life ==
The only surviving son of Edward Ambler and his wife, Mary Cary (1733–1781), was only eight years old when his father died, but inherited considerable property in many Virginia counties when he came of age, since his elder brother Edward Ambler Jr. drowned in 1775. His paternal grandfather, Richard Ambler, was a British merchant who traded primarily from his house in the port of Yorktown (where the York River enters the Hampton Roads area of Chesapeake Bay). Richard Ambler married an heiress, and succeeded to significant estates of this man's great-grandfather Edward Jaquelin, who had likewise married an heiress. Richard Ambler also became the tax collector for the York River area, as successively would be each of his sons and this man. His father had inherited the York County property and the business, which he expanded considerably, including by inheriting property from his unmarried brother John Ambler in Jamestown and James City County. However, both Edward and John had died of tuberculosis by 1768, when this boy was very young. Their younger brother Jaquelin Ambler helped their mother raise this boy and his siblings. Their mother, took the boys and their sisters to Baltimore for inoculations against smallpox, and also sent this boy to a Philadelphia boarding school, but brought him back to Virginia as the American Revolutionary War, since sending him to England for his education as directed in his father's will proved impracticable. Because their family's landholdings were in a major theater of the conflict, their mother took them to one of the plantations this man inherited, "The Cottage" in Hanover County, where he attended a local private school directed by a man named Bates, and where his mother would die in May 1781, shortly before this man reached legal age. Jaquelin Ambler was an ardent patriot and government official during and after the American Revolutionary War and af, as was this young man, although it devastated their property.

== Career ==
=== Planter ===
In the Virginia tax census shortly before this man reached legal age, he was taxed upon 22 slaves in James City County, but his biographer believes he actually owned hundreds of slaves in several counties, as well as livestock and shares of the Dismal Swamp Canal, the Richmond Dock and three banks. When Ambler reached legal age and married as described below, he decided to reside in a Georgian mansion which his grandfather had erected on Jamestown Island, and where his namesake uncle had also resided until a fire caused considerable damage and later rebuilding. Artist Louis Girardin visited Jamestown and his Amoenitates Graphicae (1805) contained a painting of a two story house at Jamestown with a mansard roof which may have been this man's residence.

Like his ancestors, John Ambler farmed using enslaved labor. Upon coming of age, Ambler also owned 800 acres on Jamestown Island, as well as 375 acres on the mainland including plantations called the "Maine Farm" and "Powhatan", plus as leased more than 300 acres in Governors Land on the mainland side of that isthmus as had his great-grandfather Edward Jaquelin and later generations (but which this man converted to fee simple ownership in 1788). Ambler also owned town lots in Yorktown (which had been devastated in the final days of the War for Independence) as well as Richmond, Manchester (then across the James River but now part of the City) Westham in Richmond, the Mill Tract in Henrico County and "The Cottage" in Hanover County, as well as plantations called "Mill Farm", "Loheland" and "Nero's" in Louisa County, and "Glenambler" and "St. Moore" in Amherst County further upriver in Virginia's central Piedmont. Somewhat north in then vast Frederick County, Ambler owned 1,1015 acres in Piedmont Manor and 10,000acres in Leeds Manor (in what became Fauqier County, Virginia and several westward counties north of the James River).

The division of his landholdings among his children and the number of slaves on those outlying plantations has not yet been the subject of extensive inquiry. In 1784 Ambler operated his Jamestown plantation using overseer William Chick and 38 slaves. As discussed below, Jamestown Island was raided on July 1, 1813. In 1815 he transferred that 900 acres Jamestown tract to his firstborn son, Edward Ambler, but retained his James City County landholdings. In 1820, a John Ambler (likely this man) owned 120 slaves in Louisa County, but he was probably not the John Ambler who owned slaves in Hampshire County since that county was split from Frederick County long before this man's birth.

=== Politician ===
Although Ambler was a local justice of the peace, his legislative career only encompassed two terms. James City County voters elected this John Ambler and John Pierce as their (part-time) representatives in the Virginia House of Delegates in 1793 and re-elected the pair once before William Browne replaced Ambler .

After the death of this man's second wife, as well as of his uncle Jaquelin in 1799, Ambler's third wife convinced him to move from that area (notoriously unhealthy during summers) to Richmond. In 1806 Ambler purchased an elegant house in the Shockoe section, but the family continued to spend winters in Jamestown. By 1807, John Ambler resided at Westham plantation about nine miles upriver from the town at the falls of the James River. In addition to the Yorktown lots owned by the family for generations, Ambler also owned city lots in Richmond (near 10th and Cary streets) and in Manchester across the James River (and now part of Richmond).

He was a member of the jury that tried Aaron Burr, supervised by Judge John Marshall.

Before the turn of the century, Ambler constructed a log and stone causeway to connect Jamestown island to the mainland. He also paid for a brick wall to enclose the Jamestown churchyard. Jamestown had two celebrations after he moved to Richmond, in 1807 and 1822, but his participation is unclear.

=== Military officer ===
Before he moved to Richmond, Ambler captained the Jamestown cavalry from at least 1797 until 1801. During the War of 1812, he led the 19th Virginia with the rank of colonel. They were stationed at Camp Bottoms Bridge in New Kent County and at Frazier's Tavern in Henrico County, both considerably upriver from Jamestown Island. After the attack on the U.S.S. Cheseapeake, Ambler commanded troops sent to guarded Norfolk (considerably downriver, but a major naval target, hence the Battle of Hampton in 1813). His son Thomas Marshall Ambler (1791-1875), also served under him as a private (but came to live in Fauquier County). In 1813, British troops landed at Jamestown Island and plundered the Ambler home there.

== Personal life ==
This John Ambler married three times and survived two of his wives. In 1782, he wed Frances Armistead (1714-1787) of New Kent County, who bore a son Edward Ambler II (1783-1846) and a daughter Mary Cary Ambler Smith (1787-1843) before dying at Jamestown in 1788. On May 21, 1791, the widower married Lucy Marshall (1768-1793), whom he may have met when visiting his uncle at Yorktown during the conflict (since her father Col. Thomas Marshall was stationed there, as was his son (this man's brother in law) John Marshall), or at the new state's capital at Richmond. However, Lucy Marshall Ambler also died at Jamestown, when their son Thomas Marshall Ambler was an infant. One biographer believes both died of malaria. On November 21, 1799, Ambler married Catherine Boush Norton (1773-1846), the widow of John Hatley Norton and mother of Dr. Daniel Norborne Norton (1791-1842). She ultimately convinced Ambler to move from notoriously unhealty Jamestown in 1807, and ultimately survived him. Five of this man's children from that third marriage reached adulthood and married: John Jaquelin Ambler (1801-1854), Catherine Cary Ambler Moncure (1802-1850), Philip St. George Ambler (1806-1877), Richard Cary Ambler (1810-1877), William Marshall Ambler (1813-1896) and Gabriella Brockenbrough Ambler Brooke (1815-1874).

In the 1810 federal census, this man's 18 person household in Richmond included ten slaves, A decade later Ambler owned 11 slaves at his Richmond residence, which number grew to 14 in the last census of his lifetime.

== Death and legacy ==
John Ambler died in Richmond in 1836 and was buried at now-historic Shockoe Hill Cemetery, as was his first wife. His eldest surviving son, Edward Ambler II, who had continued the family's political tradition by representing Henrico County (which surrounded Richmond, Virginia) in the Virginia House of Delegates (from 1824-1826 during his father's lifetime), inherited the Powhatan plantation and eventually gave it to his daughter Mary, the wife of Williamsburg attorney John Hill Smith of King and Queen County, while he moved westward to Fauquier County. His eldest son of his third marriage, John Jaquelin Ambler, had already chronicled the family's history and genealogy in 1826-1826). However, the family member with the most extensive legislative experience proved to be the youngest son, William Marshall Ambler, who was educated as a lawyer began his legislative career after this man's death. William M. Ambler served many terms in the Virginia Senate representing Louisa and surrounding counties and eventually became its Speaker, and who also represented Louisa County in the Virginia Secession Convention of 1861, where he voted for secession. His brother John Jaquelin Ambler enlisted in the Confederate Army and served in the engineering corps before resuming a mercantile business in the Lynchburg/Amherst County area. His great-grandson James Markham Ambler (son of Richard Cary Ambler), a Confederate cavalryman who became a medical doctor and U.S. Navy officer, died exploring the Arctic, and his frozen body was recovered and transported to the Leeds parish church in 1884.

His former Richmond home, near his uncle Jaquelin at 10th and Cary Streets, was destroyed before the Civil War, and the entire block today is an office building for the Richmond Department of Social Services. In 1962, the Virginia Historical Society purchased Ambler family papers from the Library of Congress and makes them accessible to researchers.
