= Champion Travis (burgess) =

Member of the Virginia House of Delegates representing James City County
- In office 1801 – November 1806 Serving with William Lightfoot
- Preceded by: Littleton W. Tazewell
- Succeeded by: Robert Greenhow
- In office May 7, 1781 – May 1782 Serving with Joseph Prentis
- Preceded by: James Innes
- Succeeded by: Nathaniel Burwell

Member of the House of Burgesses representing Jamestown
- In office 1769-1776
- Preceded by: Edward Ambler
- Succeeded by: position abolished

Personal details
- Born: circa 1745 Jamestown, Colony of Virginia
- Died: 1810 James City County, Virginia
- Spouse: Elizabeth Boush
- Relations: Edward Travis (grandfather)
- Children: several including Samuel Travis
- Occupation: planter, politician

Military service
- Branch/service: Virginia militia
- Rank: Colonel
- Unit: Elizabeth City District Battalion

Champion Travis (1745 – 1810) was a Virginia planter, patriot and politician.

== Early life ==
The firstborn son of the former Susanna Hutchings of Norfolk and her planter and burgess husband Edward Champion Travis (1720-1779). He could trace his descent from Edward Travis, who emigrated from England to the Virginia colony before 1637. That ancestor patented land on the south side of the James River in Surry County then married the "daughter and heiress" of John Johnston who owned land on Jamestown Island and increased his landholdings (from 196 acres on the island's eastern end to 396 acres by the time of his death), and represented in the House of Burgesses during 1644 session. Two successive generations of men also named Edward Travis farmed on Jamestown Island before the next man in the family to serve in the House of Burgesses, this man's father. This boy's first name not only reflects his father's middle name, it probably honors his maternal great grandfather, John Champion (whose daughter became the first wife of Edward Travis II). By the time of this boy's birth, his father owned more than 800 acres which included most of Jamestown Island (the remainder owned by the Ambler family), and a town lot, which allowed him to represent Jamestown in the House of Burgesses most years between 1752 and 1772 (when he was ruled ineligible because he was living in York County). Until at least 1770, his father owned a sloop, the Jamestown, which he used to transport enslaved Africans from Barbados to Virginia, at least until 1758. The family included two younger brothers (Edward Travis IV and John Travis) and a sister (also Susanna). The family's lands on Jamestown Island were in a war zone beginning in 1775, because of the island's strategic importance. Edward C. Travis died in 1779, after this man had begun his own public career and his brother Edward Travis IV had already begun a career as a naval officer.

== Career ==
=== Planter ===
The 1769 tax records for James City County showed this man owned no land (although he would inherit his father's holdings on Jamestown Island in a decade). He was taxed for ten enslaved people. When their father died, he received almost all his father's land on Jamestown Island, as well as lots in Jamestown and Williamsburg, and Piney Grove plantation in James City County a few miles west of Jamestown. His brother John Travis inherited the Timson Neck plantation in nearby York County, and the youngest brother Edward Travis IV inherited land in Brunswich and Surry Counties south of the James River. In 1782, after the American Revolutionary War discussed below, he was taxed on 2,088 acres of land (in 2 separate plantations in James City County) as well as 24 slaves, 32 cattle and a two wheeled chariot. However, the next year he owned fewer slaves but more cattle, as well as a four-wheeled carriage. Furthermore, on May 31, 1793, two enslaved women (Nelly and Daphne) killed overseer Joel Gathright. Although the precise circumstances of the murder are now unknown, the women were executed. By 1797 the number of slaves Travis owned had declined, possibly because of economic difficulties. He disposed of Piney Grove plantation in 1800-1801, by which time his Jamestown plantation lacked a resident overseer.

=== Politician ===
Champion Travis served in local offices in James City County, including justice of the peace and sheriff. In 1769 Jamestown voters first elected Champion Travis to represent them in the House of Burgesses in nearby Williamsburg. He succeeded his sometime neighbor Edward Ambler (who also owned vast estates in James City County, York County and many other Virginia counties), and who had briefly succeeded his younger brother, lawyer John (who had died of tuberculosis shortly after their father). Travis won re-election until Governor Lord Dunmore prorogued the legislature. Champion Travis then represented Jamestown at all but the second Virginia Revolutionary Conventions in Richmond.

=== American Revolutionary War ===
During the American Revolutionary War, beginning in September 1775, Champion Travis commanded the Elizabeth City District Battalion (a Virginia militia unit with units from Williamsburg and six neighboring counties, including James City County) and attained the rank of colonel. His brother, Edward Travis, became a lieutenant in the 2nd Virginia Regiment in 1775, transferred to naval service on October 24, 1775, then was captured by the British on January 31, 1776, but survived that captivity and earned a promotion to captain. Their brother John was still underage in 1779, and their sister Susannah married William Armistead of "the Neck" in New Kent County, who was one of the state agents responsible for securing arms, clothing and supplies during the conflict.

Both Travis patriots may have participated in several naval skirmishes in November 1775, which included unsuccessful British attacks on Burwell's ferry (by the schooner Kingfisher and two sloops) as the month began and the Jamestown ferry midmonth. A British cannonball damaged the chimney of Travis' kitchen during one attack on Jamestown itself, but the naval distractions may have permitted British to win the Battle of Kemp's Landing far downriver. Also a British tender ran aground in a sandbar at Cobham nearby in March 1776 (and was captured and converted to patriot use by the Surry County militia), which led to construction of more substantial fortifications on Jamestown Island beginning that April, so the island had a 2-gun battery and 12-man garrison by 1777.

Travis became a commissioner of Virginia's Naval Board in 1776, the same year in which the Virginia Convention informed him that his residence on Jamestown and other land was occupied and appropriated as guardhouses, and for which he sought compensation. This or depopulation during the conflict might have help end Jamestown as a separate legislative constituency in the Virginia Constitution of 1776. For the next several years, although imports occasionally came in at its wharves, Jamestown became a place to store arms and exchange hostages, while the opposing armies fought elsewhere. Nonetheless, some noted that its reputation as unhealthy during summers continued. Of Col. Charles Lewis' 2nd Battalion of Minutemen ordered to garrison the island in June 1776, two companies were sent home to recover after illnesses made them unfit for duty.

Travis' landholdings again became part of the main theater of wartime operations in 1781. That July, fighting occurred at Glasshouse Point just north of Jamestown, then the Battle of Green Spring included fighting at the former plantation of Gov. William Berkeley across the causeway from Jamestown. British General Cornwallis evacuated his troops to Jamestown Island before crossing the river to Cobham the following day. Following that battle, General Lafayette established a hospital for patriot wounded at Jamestown, which operated for months under a truce flag. On September 2, 1782, the Marquis de Saint Simon landed reinforcements for General Lafayette at Jamestown, and again a few weeks later during the Siege of Yorktown and last campaign of the conflict.

=== Postwar ===
Following the conflict, Travis's property showed wartime damage, but unlike most of his Ambler neighbors (who moved westward), Travis remained at Jamestown or nearby Williamsburg (part of which was in James City County, as was their Piney Grove plantation). As mentioned in the planter section above, he had financial difficulties, and employed no white overseer at Jamestown for several years.

Travis served in the Virginia House of Delegates as the war ended, as James City County voters elected him and future Speaker Joseph Prentis to replace James Innes and William Norvell, but failed to re-elect either man the following year. Travis resumed his legislative career representing James City County more than a decade later, as he succeeded Littleton W. Tazewell (who was elected to Congress) and was re-elected together with William Lightfoot until mid-1806.

Artist Louis Girardin visited Jamestown well after the conflict, and his Amoenitates Graphicae (1805) contained a painting of urban Jamestown which included a 1.5 story dwelling that had been occupied by generations of Travises.

In 1807, Champion Travis was present at the bicentennial of the founding of Jamestown, as were several other former members of the Virginia Revolutionary Conventions and Revolutionary War soldiers.

Because of its strategic location, further fortifications were constructed at Jamestown during the War of 1812, but failed to deter British raiders who plundered Ambler's plantation on July 1, 1813 (three years after this man's death and following the Battle of Hampton. The following April Col. Decius Wadsworth evaluated Jamestown among other sites for a new fort, but such plans were abandoned when the war ended.

== Personal life ==
On November 28, 1772, Travis married Elizabeth (Betsey) Boush, daughter of Captain Samuel Boush of Norfolk and his wife (the former Alice Mason). They had two or four sons (Samuel and Robert and perhaps William L and John Travis). Even the firstborn, Samuel, was under legal age when their father died in 1810, and did not receive control of his Jamestown inheritance until 1817 or 1818, in part because of his wartime service, and in part because under this man's will, he needed to purchase his siblings' shares in the property. Their sister Susan married Edmund Ruffin, then known as an agricultural reformer, and her sister Catherine married Jessee Cole of Williamsburg.

== Death and legacy ==
Travis died in the early autumn of 1810, survived by his widow and several children. His eldest surviving son, Samuel Travis, though still underage at the time, ultimately inherited the Jamestown island and town property. Samuel Travis, however, chose to live in Williamsburg rather than at Jamestown. He continued the family traditions as a planter, military officer (serving in the War of 1812) and legislator (serving in the Virginia House of Delegates). However, the fort was not rebuilt, and by 1820 no buildings existed on the Travis' Jamestown Island property that were deemed taxable. (Traditionally, slave housing and tobacco barns were excluded from assessment). During the Virginiad celebration of 1822 (celebrating the Jamestown landing and survival after the Massacre of 1622), the Travis home which had survived the prior wars caught fire. For his service, or as partial compensation for his losses at Jamestown, Travis received land in Kentucky.
