= John Clayton (d. 1737) =

American legislator and attorney general

Attorney General for the Virginia colony
- In office 1714 – November 18, 1737
- Preceded by: Stevens Thomsen
- Succeeded by: Edward Barradall

Member of the House of Burgesses from Williamsburg, Colony of Virginia
- In office 1728-1734
- Preceded by: John Holloway
- Succeeded by: John Blair Sr.

Member of the House of Burgesses from James City County, Colony of Virginia
- In office 1720-1726 Serving with Archibald Blair
- Preceded by: William Broadnax
- Succeeded by: Joseph Eggleston

Member of the House of Burgesses from James Town, Colony of Virginia
- In office 1715-1717
- Preceded by: Edward Jaquelin
- Succeeded by: Archibald Blair

Personal details
- Born: c. 1666 Buckinghamshire or Middlesex County, England
- Died: November 28, 1737 (aged 70–71) Williamsburg, Virginia
- Resting place: Bruton Parish
- Children: including Rev. John Clayton, Thomas Clayton
- Relatives: William Clayton (grandson)
- Education: Eton College; University of Cambridge
- Occupation: lawyer; politician

John Clayton (c. 1666 – November 28, 1737) was a British lawyer who emigrated to the colony of Virginia where he served at Attorney General as well as in the House of Burgesses, representing variously Jamestown, James City County and Williamsburg.

== Early and family life ==
Born to the former Alice Bowyer Buggins and her attorney husband, Sir John Clayton, he would have at least two younger siblings. Both his maternal and paternal grandparents were gentry in Buckinghamshire and Middlesex County in Britain. He received an education appropriate to his class first at Eton College and then Trinity Hall of the University of Cambridge, but received no degree from either. Instead, in 1682 Clayton began studying law at the Inner Temple in London, of which his father was a member.

Admitted to the bar in 1691, Clayton began a private legal practice in London.

Probably around the same time, Clayton married a woman named Lucy in London, although her family connections are unknown. In 1695 she gave birth to a son they named John, and who would become a minister and serve for decades as clerk of the Gloucester, Virginia court, but who is today best known for his botanical compilations and discoveries. By 1702, Clayton's family included three sons, but Lucy may have died, contributing to this man's decision to accompany his acquaintance Edward Nott, who had secured a royal appointment to become the governor of the Virginia colony. Also, a distant cousin, Rev. John Clayton (1656-1725), who had graduated from the University of Oxford in 1674 and 1682, had already lived in the Virginia colony, where he led the Jamestown parish (then the seat of the colony's government, but known for unhealthy conditions in summertime) until his return to England in 1786, and was becoming known for his botanical observations.

== Career in Virginia ==
Edward Nott died in the Virginia colony about a year after his and Clayton's arrival, on August 23, 1706. Clayton handled the probate administration of Nott's estate, and expanded his legal practice among the colony's gentry, gaining a reputation as an able and honest lawyer. In particular, for more than a decade he was the personal attorney for William Byrd II, who had been educated as a lawyer in London, and headed the Governor's Council.

On January 23, 1706, during Nott's administration, Clayton had become the registrar for the Virginia Court of Vice Admiralty, and had soon assisted the colony's attorney general in a murder trial. In 1711 Clayton traveled to North Carolina at the new governor's behest to resolve a dispute, and in 1712 he assisted in the trials of several Africans and Native Americans charged with rebellion or treason. In the 1710s, Clayton and fellow attorneys John Holloway and William Robertson prepared a collection of Virginia statues in force, and Clayton later revised that compilation, which William Parks published in 1733.

In 1714, when attorney general Stephens Thomson died, Lt. Gov. Alexander Spotswood nominated Clayton as his successor, which the Board of Trade in London formally approved in 1721. In that year, Clayton also became a judge of the Virginia Court of Vice Admiralty (before which he did not practice as the colony's attorney general, but which adjudicated maritime prize cases, among other disputes). Clayton remained the colony's attorney general practicing before the General Court until his death, except during a trip to England to handle family and personal business between April 1626 and some time in 1727 or early 1728, when he re-assumed those responsibilities from John Randolph, whom he had suggested as his temporary successor. During this time, the number of criminal cases became such that Clayton ended his private legal practice by 1733 and petitioned the Board of Trade to increase his salary, which had long stood at 100 pounds sterling annually, and ultimately received a 40% increase

Meanwhile, in 1710, Clayton was elected to the board governing the College of William and Mary in Williamsburg, and from 1712 to 1714 also received a salary as clerk of the committee of Propositions and Grievances for the House of Burgesses, a position which ended when he became a burgess in his own right, as discussed below. Clayton helped oversee repairs to the capital in both the 1710s (when he also oversaw the surveying of Williamsburg's streets), and again in the 1720s. Some of these activities may have been part of his duties as justice of the peace for surrounding James City County, for the justices collectively were responsible for administering the county in that era, and Clayton became the presiding judge for the county court in 1717.

When the town of Williamsburg received a charter from the legislature in 1722, Clayton became its recorder, or chief legal officer, and continued in that position until his death.

For nearly two decades, voters in Virginia's successive capitals, Jamestown and Williamsburg and surrounding James City County successively elected Clayton as either their sole representative in the House of Burgesses (for Jamestown, and later for Williamsburg) or as one of their two representatives (for James City County).

== Death and legacy ==
In his final years, Clayton suffered from gout. He died at his Williamsburg home and was buried without much ceremony, as he requested. His grandson would also serve as a burgess, as would several later descendants.
