= Daniel McCarty =

Daniel McCarty may refer to:

- Daniel McCarty (Virginia politician) (1679-1724), Virginian politician
- Daniel T. McCarty (1912-1953), 31st Governor of Florida
