= William Clayton (burgess) =

American legislator, patriot and planter)

Member of the Virginia House of Delegates from New Kent County
- In office October 7, 1776-December 21, 1776 Serving with Armistead Russell
- Preceded by: position established
- Succeeded by: Richmond Allen

Member of the House of Burgesses from James Town, Colony of Virginia
- In office 1766-1772 Serving with Burwell Bassett
- Preceded by: Richard Adams
- Succeeded by: Bartholomew Dandridge

Personal details
- Born: 1717 Gloucester County, Colony of Virginia
- Died: 1797 (aged 79–80) Chestnut Hill Plantation, New Kent County, Virginia
- Spouse: Elvira Clayton
- Relatives: John Clayton (grandfather); Rev. John Clayton (father)
- Occupation: planter, politician

William Clayton (c. 1717 – December 14, 1797) was Virginia planter, officer, patriot and politician who served as the clerk of New Kent County, Virginia for decades, and also represented the county in the House of Burgesses (1766–1771), in the final Virginia Revolutionary Convention and first session of the Virginia House of Delegates, and in the 1788 Virginia convention to ratify the United States Constitution.

== Early and family life ==
The middle of five sons born to the former Elizabeth Whiting and her husband, Rev. John Clayton, his family also included several sisters. His birth date is uncertain because Gloucester County records were destroyed in several fires, Gloucester County was divided into several parishes in 1752, and his uncle Edward Clayton also lived in Gloucester County and used similar names for his children. In addition to his spiritual duties and operating his farm, his father also served as clerk of Gloucester County for more than five decades, was the president of the Virginia Society for the Promotion of Useful Knowledge, and was succeeded as clerk by this man's brother Jasper (who died in the American Revolutionary War and whose estate this man would supervise in 1779). Their grandfather, John Clayton emigrated from England and held important posts in the colony's government, as well as acquired and operated several plantations in Virginia's Tidewater region.

== Career ==
Around 1756, William Clayton succeeded his mentor as the clerk of New Kent County, a position he would hold for the rest of his life, as had his father and younger brother in nearby Gloucester County. He was first elected to the vestry of St. Peter's Parish in New Kent County in 1758. During his long tenure as county clerk, Clayton managed to save the records when the courthouse burned in March 1775, but lost many records (and his late father's scientific papers) during an arson fire in 1787.

Beginning in 1766, voters in New Kent County elected this man as one of their representatives in the House of Burgesses, and re-elected him until 1772. As a burgess who lived somewhat close to the colonial capital, he served on the Committee for Courts of Justice in 1766 and 1769, and in the latter year also on the Committee of Propositions and Grievances and the Committee to Proportion the Public Levy.

As relations with Britain grew strained over the mother country's attempt to levy taxes, Clayton joined nonimportation associations in 1769, 1770 and 1774. Beginning in 1774, Clayton was a member of New Kent County's Committee of Safety. During the American Revolutionary War, he was the county lieutenant and responsible for securing men and materials for the patriot forces. He also served as clerk as county voters met to instruct their delegates to Virginia's First Revolutionary Convention.

Clayton himself served in the fifth Virginia Revolutionary Convention which ended on July 5, 1776; he replaced Burwell Bassett for that session and served alongside his successor in the House of Burgesses, Bartholomew Dandridge. That fall, Clayton won election as one of New Kent County's two representatives in the new Virginia House of Delegates. In 1788 he won his last election and represented New Kent County in the Virginia Ratification Convention. He voted to ratify the federal constitution. Clayton called his home plantation "Chestnut Hill" (not to be confused with nearby "Chestnut Grove" nor a plantation of the same name in Loudoun County which survived much longer). Clayton hosted a Methodist meeting in 1791, and one of the ministers wrote of its beauty. In 1782, Clayton owned 728 acres of land in New Kent County, and by 1788 had acquired another 1,080 acres, which he also farmed using enslaved labor. He paid taxes on 24 slaves in 1797.

== Death and legacy ==
Clayton prepared his last will and testament on June 10, 1797. However, considerable controversy exists concerning his death date, sources varying between June or July or December in that year. His will being proved in court on December 14, 1797.
