= Abraham Nicholas =

American politician

Mayor of Williamsburg, Virginia
- In office 1735–1736

Adjutant-General of the Virginia Colony
- In office 1 November 1728 – September 3, 1738

Personal details
- Died: September 3, 1738

Major Abraham Nicholas (died September 3, 1738) served as mayor of Williamsburg, Virginia, from 1735 to 1736. He married a woman named Ann and had at least one son, Abraham Nicholas who died on March 5, 1751.

Nicholas was the first Adjutant-General of the Virginia Colony from 1 November 1728, until his death ten years later. (Succeeded by Isham Randolph, appointed Adjutant-General by Governor William Gooch, who was approved by the Council on 9 November 1738.)

Preceded by John Holloway	Mayor of Williamsburg, Virginia; 1735–1736	Succeeded by Edward Barradall
