= Mary Cary Ambler =

American diarist

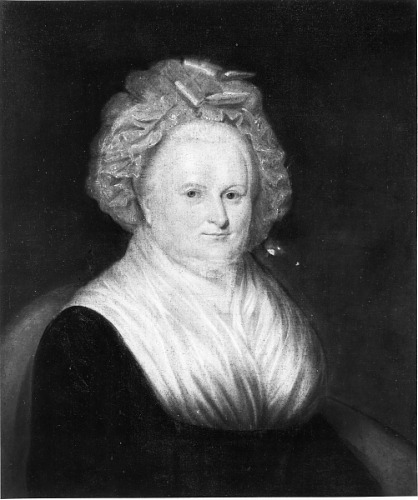
- Born: February 3, 1733
- Died: May 1781
- Resting place: Jamestown Fort James Cemetery
- Occupation: Diarist
- Spouse: Edward Ambler
- Father: Wilson Cary
- Relatives: Wilson Miles Cary, Elizabeth Cary, Sally Fairfax
- Family: Sally Fairfax

Mary Cary Ambler (1732 – May 1781) was an early American diarist. Her 1770 diary provides an early account of smallpox inoculation in colonial America.

Mary Cary was the daughter of Colonel Wilson Cary (1702-1772), owner of the plantation Ceelys on the James in Elizabeth City County, Virginia, and his wife Sarah (1710-1783). In 1754, eighteen-year-old Mary Cary married Edward Ambler (1733-1768), firstborn son of wealthy merchant Richard Ambler (1690-1766) and heiress Elizabeth Jaquelin. Edward Ambler was a graduate of Cambridge University who was six feet tall and fond of wearing red velvet suits trimmed with gold lace.

They had seven children, three of whom lived to adulthood:

- Elizabeth Ambler (1754-1756)
- Richard Ambler (1756-1759)
- Edward Ambler (1758-1782)
- Sarah Ambler Macon (1760-1782)
- Colonel John Ambler (1762-1836)
- Mary Ambler (1764-1768)
- Martha Ambler (1764-1768)

Edward Ambler inherited the Yorktown property of his father in 1766, where the couple resided, as well as extensive properties in outlying counties. When his brother John Ambler died later that year, Edward Ambler also inherited his father's brick mansion and plantations on Jamestown Island from his brother. The couple moved to Jamestown, preferring the natural and historical setting, but it was also known as unhealthy, especially in summers. Edward Ambler died "after a tedious illness" in 1768 (which some considered tuberculosis like his brother), and his son John Ambler would move away in 1799 after further deaths.

In 1770, Mary Ambler took her children Sarah and John, on a three month journey to Baltimore, Maryland in order to get them inoculated against smallpox, a frequent and lethal disease of the time, by "Dr.Stephenson", presumably John Stevenson. The process was lengthy and expensive. In her diary, Ambler wrote about the process, the details of their meals and travel, and her appreciation for her Baltimore landlady's library, especially Sermons to Young Women.

During the American Revolutionary War, Ambler decamped further inland for Hanford County, Virginia, renting her Jamestown property to Captain Edward Travis. She died there in 1781 and was buried in Jamestown at her request.

Mary Cary is sometimes said to have been a love interest of a young George Washington, but this is due to confusion with her elder sister, Sally Fairfax.
