= Daniel McCarty (Virginia politician) =

29th Speaker of the Virginia House of Burgesses
- In office 1715–1718
- Preceded by: Peter Beverley
- Succeeded by: John Holloway

Member of the Virginia House of Burgesses from Westmoreland County
- In office 1705–1724
- Succeeded by: Thomas Lee

Personal details
- Born: c. 1679 Colony of Virginia
- Died: May 4, 1724 (aged 44–45) Colony of Virginia
- Children: 8
- Occupation: Lawyer; politician

Daniel McCarty (c. 1679 – May 4, 1724) was a politician and lawyer in the British colony of Virginia. He served as Speaker of the House of Burgesses (1715–18) and represented Westmoreland County in the House for several sessions.

== Early life and education ==
McCarty was born in 1679, the son of wealthy Irish immigrants who had arrived in Virginia four years' prior.

He studied law and in 1702 at the age of 23, he began working as an assistant at the Westmoreland County Court. In 1703, he was an active attorney in the county, and in 1704 he was appointed as the "Queen's Attorney" in the county.

== Career ==
In 1705, McCarty entered the House of Burgesses as a member. He was appointed to the committee for privileges and elections and took an active part in the work of the House.

In addition to representing the area in the House of Burgesses, McCarty held other positions within Westmoreland County. In 1710, he was appointed as a Judge of the Westmoreland County Court and as Sheriff of the county for a period. In 1714, McCarty served as Collector of Customs for the Potomac River district of the colony.

Outside of his political career, McCarty was a prominent landowner and planter in Virginia. He owned 150 acres of land in Westmoreland County, 1,350 acres of land in Richmond County, and other land holdings in Prince William, and Stafford counties.

=== Speaker of the House of Burgesses ===
In August 1715, McCarty defeated three other candidates in the election for Speaker of the House of Burgesses. The session of 1715, over which McCarty presided, has been regarded by historians as a period of intense political infighting between Governor Alexander Spotswood and the House of Burgesses.

McCarty remained as an active member of the House for several subsequent sessions, including serving as chairman on the committee on propositions and grievances.

== Death ==
McCarty died on May 4, 1724, at the age of 45. He was buried in the churchyard of Yeocomico Church.
