= John Harmer (mayor) =

American politician

John Harmer served as mayor of Williamsburg, Virginia from 1737 to 1738.

Harmer was mayor of Williamsburg in 1738 and 1746, a churchwarden for Bruton Parish Church, and Burgess for Williamsburg from 1742 to 1747. He also served as a justice of the York County Court.

Political offices
Preceded by Edward Barradall	Mayor of Williamsburg, Virginia; 1737–1738	Succeeded by George Gilmer

== Notes ==
- Tyler, Lyon Gardiner, ed. Encyclopedia of Virginia Biography. Volume 1. New York: Lewis Historical Publishing Company, 1915. OCLC 2576742. Retrieved July 15, 2011.
