= Edward Barradall =

American lawyer and politician

Acting Attorney General for the Virginia colony
- In office 1737–1743
- Preceded by: John Clayton
- Succeeded by: Thomas Nelson

Member of the House of Burgesses from College of William and Mary
- In office 1737–1743
- Preceded by: John Randolph
- Succeeded by: Beverley Randolph

Personal details
- Born: 1703 Kent, England
- Died: 1743 (aged 39–40) Virginia, U.S.
- Resting place: Bruton Parish Church; Williamsburg, Virginia, U.S.
- Spouse: Sarah Fitzhugh (m. 1736)
- Children: 1
- Profession: attorney; author; judge; politician

Edward Barradall (c. 1703–1743) was a British attorney, admiralty judge and politician who represented the College of William and Mary in the House of Burgesses, served as mayor of Williamsburg and compiled the first volume of decisions of the general Court of the Colony of Virginia.

== Early and family life ==
Born in England to Henry Barradall and his wife Catherine Blumfield, who had married in 1676, Barradell studied law and was admitted to the bar at the Inner Temple.

On January 5, 1736, in Virginia, Barradell married Sarah, the daughter and granddaughter of planters named William FitzHugh, and sister of Burgess William Fitzhugh. They had a son, Edward Barradall, Jr., orphaned as a child but who reached adulthood and had children.

== Career ==
Barradall emigrated from England with his two brothers and sisters to the Colony of Virginia. He developed a successful legal practice in Williamsburg and Lord Fairfax, who had vast land claims sometimes known as the Northern Neck Proprietary was one of his clients. Barradell succeeded John Clayton as the Attorney General of Virginia in 1737.

That same year, Sir John Randolph who represented the College of William and Mary in the House of Burgesses (and was also its Speaker) died, and Barradell succeeded him as burgess for the next sessions, until his death. Barradell also served as Judge of the Admiralty Court. and mayor of Williamsburg, Virginia (1736-1737).

Edward Barradall is sometimes called Virginia's first law reporter, because a manuscript of his notes concerning cases adjudicated by the General Court of Virginia between April 1733 and October 1741 was published long after his death, although the original manuscript is now lost.

In 1739 one of Barradall's indentured servants, John Davis, a West Country man imported from Bristol, ran away, so Barradall advertised for his return, noting that since he had lived in Philadelphia he might be trying to run back there. Barradall offered a cash reward and a pistol for Davis' return.

== Death ==
Barradall died about 1743 in Virginia, as did his wife Sarah. Both are buried together in the same tomb in the churchyard of historic Bruton Parish Church in Williamsburg.

Preceded by Abraham Nicholas	Mayor of Williamsburg, Virginia; 1736–1737	Succeeded by John Harmer
