= Edward Jaquelin =

Virginia planter & politician (1668/69–1739)

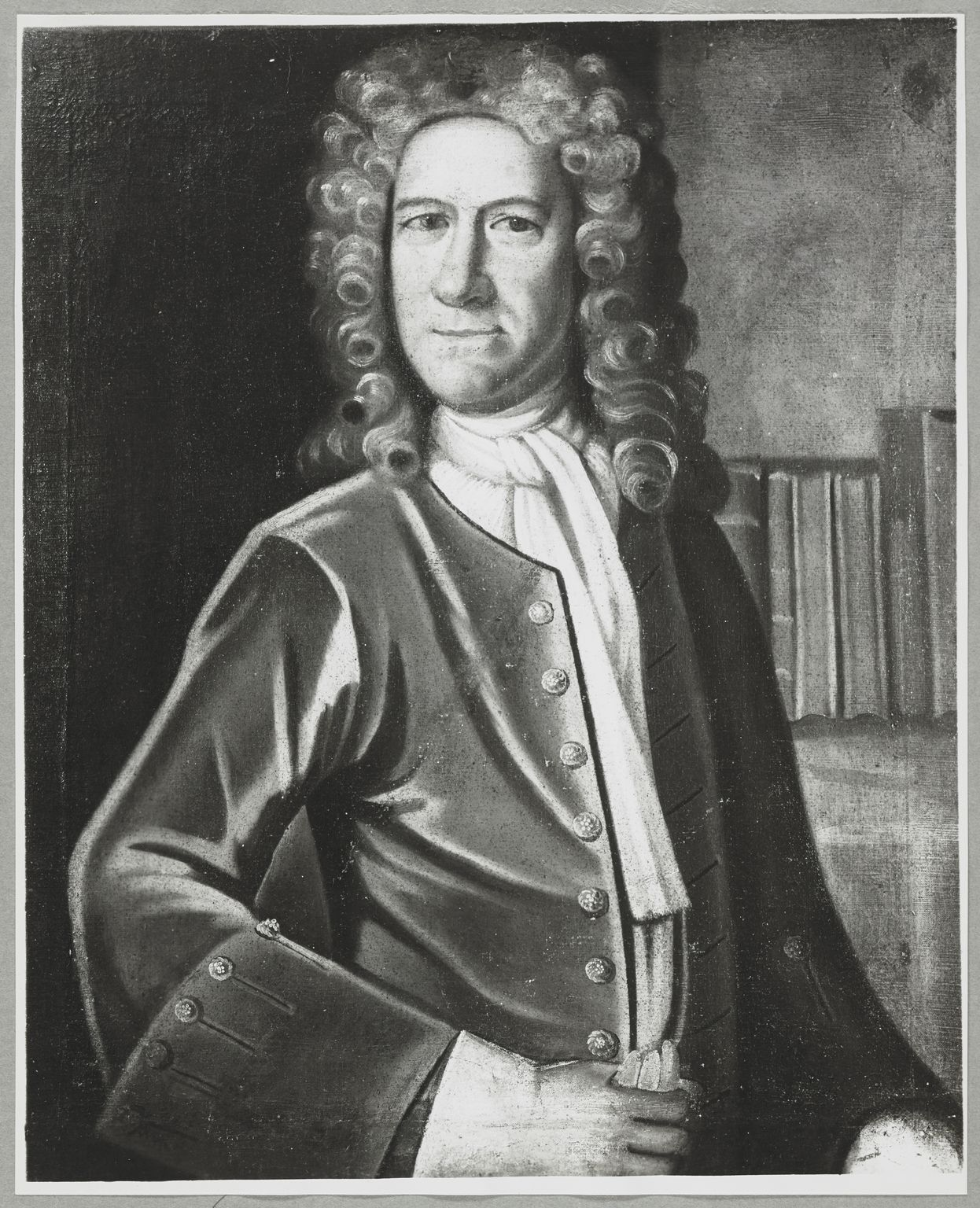

Member of the Virginia House of Burgesses representing James City
- In office 1712-1714
- Preceded by: Nathaniel Burwell
- Succeeded by: John Clayton

Personal details
- Born: 1668 or 1669 Kent County, England
- Died: 1739 (aged 70–71) Jamestown, Colony of Virginia
- Resting place: Jamestown Churchyard
- Spouse(s): Rachel James Sherwood; Martha Cary Thruston
- Relations: Edward Ambler, John Ambler, Jaquelin Ambler (grandsons)
- Children: 2 sons who predeceased him, Elizabeth Jaquelin Ambler, Martha Jaquelin and Mary Jaquelin Smith
- Occupation: Planter, politician

Military service
- Branch/service: Virginia militia
- Rank: coronet

Edward Jaquelin or Jacquelin (1668 or 1669 – November 9, 1739) was a child immigrant who became a Virginia planter and politician who represented Jamestown in the House of Burgesses.

== Early life ==
Jaquelin was born to the former Elizabeth Craddock of Kent County, England and her Huguenot husband John Jaquelin in 1668 or 1669. The family emigrated to the Virginia Colony in 1685, when Edward was a teenager.

== Career ==
Jaquelin married twice, each time to a wealthy widow and each time gained control of additional property, which was increasingly farmed using enslaved labor. In the early 18th century, some of his slaves were involved in an elaborate escape attempt. Around 1699, Jaquelin married the twice-widowed Rachel James Sherwood, who had inherited property from each of her earlier husbands. Sherwood owned a plantation on Jamestown Island, as well as land on the mainland, which may account for the quitrent Jaquelin paid in 1704 for 400 acres in James City County. On December 11, 1704, Jaquelin purchased the reversionary interest of London merchant John Jeffries in the estate of her previous husband, former attorney and burgess William Sherwood, and earlier would have been able to use his wife's dower interest in the estate of her first husband, Richard James. Sherwood had leased 260 acres in Governor's Land, on the isthmus connecting Jamestown to the mainland. Although the colony's capital moved to Williamsburg in 1699, Jaquelin leased meeting space in their home or a neighboring brick house to the assembly in that year. Jaquelin also prepared correspondence for the legislature and by 1702 was clerk for its committee of propositions and grievances. In 1712 he purchased the "Glasshouse" 24 acre tract at the entrance to Jamestown Island and began renting 151 acres in Governor's Land (taking over a lease formerly of Philip Ludwell II). In 1718 Jaquelin bought 27 acres next to the Glasshouse Tract and Governor's Land, so his mainland acreage had grown to 202 acres.

Demonstrating his increased social presence, Jaquelin became coronet of Jamestown's troop of horse in 1701, and also served as justice of the peace (1710-death), sheriff (1710–1711), and coroner (1726, 1729). Jamestown voters elected Jaquelin as their representative in the House of Burgesses in the 1712–1714 session. He succeeded Nathaniel Burwell and was in turn replaced by John Clayton.

== Personal life ==
In 1699, Jaquelin married the wealthy and twice widowed Rachel James Sherwood, whom he survived, though the couple had no children. After her death, in 1706 he married Martha Cary Thruston, the widow of John Thruston of Martin's Hundred and daughter of Lt.Col. William Cary of Elizabeth City County (Malachi Thruston had represented various constituencies in Norfolk and Princess Anne Counties in the House of Burgesses). Their first child, Elizabeth, reached adulthood and married Yorktown merchant Richard Ambler in 1729. Two of their surviving sons (this man's grandsons), Edward and John held significant local offices as well as served terms in the legislature, and their youngest brother Jaquelin Ambler distinguished himself in the Revolutionary War and afterward served on the Council of State (and his daughter became the wife of John Marshall). However, Jaquelin outlived both Martha and their sons Edward Jaquelin II (1716-1734) and Mathew Jaquelin (1707-1727). His wife Martha (or their never-married daughter Martha Jaquelin (1711-1792)) donated a baptismal font to the James City Parish church in Jamestown in 1733 (which survived the church). Her sister Mary Jacquelin (1714-1764) married John Smith of "Shooter's Hill" in Middlesex County, Virginia.

== Death and legacy ==
Jaquelin died in November 1739, having outlived both his wives and both his sons. His will was admitted to probate in James City County. Jaquelin bequeathed the Jamestown Island tract to his four year old grandson John Ambler, with life rights to the boy's father Richard Ambler, and a farm in Powhatan to his unmarried daughter Martha (who lived at her parents' Jamestown home but later moved to the Amblers' home in Yorktown, having sold that tract to her sister's husband as well as signed a quitclaim deed). Although Jaquelin's precise gravesite outside the Jamestown Church is now lost, part of the grave marker for his second wife, Martha Cary Jaquelin, was discovered in 2013.
