= Peter Beverley =

English-born planter and lawyer (1663–1728)

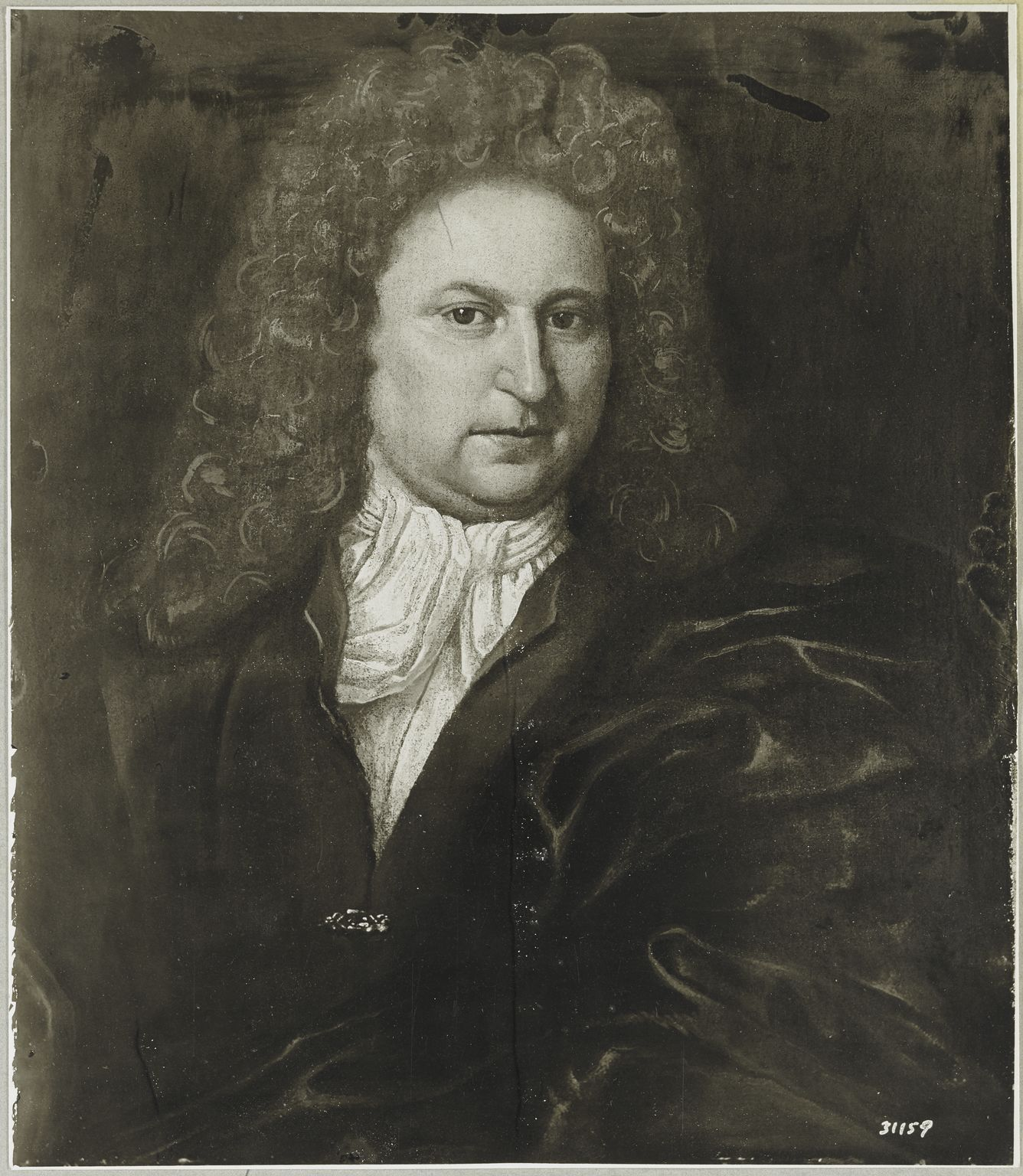
- Peter Beverley, c. 1700–1705

27th Speaker of the Virginia House of Burgesses
- In office 1710–1714
- Preceded by: Benjamin Harrison III
- Succeeded by: Robert McCarty
- In office 1700–1705
- Preceded by: Robert Carter
- Succeeded by: Benjamin Harrison III

Member of the House of Burgesses for College of William and Mary
- In office 1715 – not seated
- Preceded by: position created
- Succeeded by: John Custis

Member of the House of Burgesses for Gloucester County
- In office 1700–1714 Serving with Mordecai Cook, James Ranson, Ambrose Dudley
- Preceded by: James Ranson
- Succeeded by: John Buckner

Personal details
- Born: 1663 Kingston upon Hull, Yorkshire, England
- Died: 1728 (aged 64–65) WilliamsburgColony of Virginia, British America
- Spouse: Elizabeth Peyton
- Children: 3
- Relatives: Robert Beverley Jr. (brother); Peyton Randolph (grandson); Beverley Randolph (great-grandson)

Peter Beverley (1663 – 1728) was an English-born planter and lawyer who served as the 27th speaker of the House of Burgesses as well as treasurer of the Colony of Virginia (1710–1723). His father Robert Beverley had been the clerk of the House and a prominent member of the "Green Spring" faction in the decade after Bacon's Rebellion, and Peter Beverley also served as clerk before winning election as a Burgess and serving as speaker in four of the five assemblies at the beginning of the 18th century.

== Early and family life ==
Beverley's coat of arms

Coat of Arms of William Beverley

Peter Beverley was the first of three sons born to Major Robert Beverley, and the only one borne by his first wife, Elizabeth, probably in Kingston upon Hull in Yorkshire, England, since he was christened in the parish of St. Mary Lowgate on May 7, 1663. His father emigrated to the Virginia colony after his first wife's death, and remarried. Thus, Peter may have been raised in England with relatives before emigrating to Virginia around the time of his father's second marriage, in March 1666. He also may have been sent back to England for his education.

In 1687, after his father's death, Beverley married Elizabeth Peyton, the daughter of Major Robert Peyton. They had three daughters: Susanna, Elizabeth and Anne. Their daughter Elizabeth married William Randolph II around 1705 and had five children who reached adulthood. Their daughter Susanna, married Sir John Randolph. Their daughter Anne married Henry Whiting, probably the son of the burgess of that name, who last served in 1684.

== Career ==
By March 1681, Beverley was living in Middlesex County with his father, step-mother and soon his half-siblings. As the firstborn son, Peter Beverley acted as this father's agent in numerous land transactions which built a substantial estate in four counties. Around 1686, Peter Beverley became a licensed lawyer in the colony. Furthermore, although the crown had suspended his father from his public offices, Peter Beverley was appointed Middlesex County's surveyor, which Governor Effingham would later characterized as the county's most lucrative post.

After his father's death, in March 1687 Peter Beverley moved to Gloucester County, where he took possession of the large estate he had inherited on the bank of the Piankatank River in Ware Parish.

Beverley began wielding power in the colony as a whole in 1691, when both Lt. Governor Francis Nicholson and the House of Burgesses elected him as its clerk, the position his father had held for a decade. That became the first of several joint appointments, including as clerk of the General Court and the colony's Secretary (a position he transferred to his half-brother Robert Beverley in October 1693). In 1694, Peter Beverley became Clerk of Gloucester County, a position he continued to hold until 1719 or 1720. From 1695 until 1699, Peter Beverley also served on the committee to revise the colony's laws, and when that completed, became the Burgess' clerk until 1705 (including while he was also speaker of the body). Meanwhile, on October 20, 1698, the statehouse burned, and he and his half-brother Robert saved and then re-organized the public records.

In 1700, voters in Gloucester County elected Peter Beverley as one of their representatives in the House of Burgesses. He won re-election and would serve until 1714. Also, members of the body elected him as its speaker on December 7, 1700 (defeating two other candidates) and he served in that post until replaced by Benjamin Harrison in October 1705. Although no record exists as to whether Harrison defeated Beverley in that contest, Beverley again won election as speaker on October 25, 1710, and continued in that position until the end of the 1714 session. In 1715, he was elected to the House of Burgesses in order to represent the College of William and Mary (on whose Board of Visitors he had long served), rather than nearby Gloucester County. However, after the House of Burgesses met, on August 13, 1715, upon the motion of Gawin Corbin the House declared the college unworthy of a seat in the body, and so ruled that election improper and unseated Beverley. However, Beverley continued to act as the colony's Treasurer until 1723.

In March 1716, the William & Mary College board, which appointed surveyors for the colony, appointed Beverley as the colony's deputy surveyor general. The following summer, for about a year, Beverley also served as auditor general of the royal revenue.

In 1718, Governor Alexander Spotswood had many disagreements with members of his Advisory Council, whose members previous governors had appointed and who normally served for the remainder of their lives. Gov. Spotswood proposed to replace four recalcitrant Councilors (James Blair, Philip Ludwell John Smith and William Byrd(1674–1744)) with Peter Beverley, Cole Diggs, John Robinson and Edward Hill, who seemed more amenable to the governor. However, the appointments required approval of the Board of Trade in London. On April 9, 1719, the Board of Trade approved Peter Beverley's appointment to replace William Byrd, but Byrd petitioned to retain his seat, and the petition was granted. Thus, on May 31, 1720, the Board of Trade instead approved Beverley's appointment to succeed a Councilor who had died, John Smith. Beverley was sworn in on October 31, 1720, and served until his death. In 1723, he relinquished the office of treasurer to John Holloway who had also served as speaker.

== Death and legacy ==
Beverley's exact location and date of death were not recorded, although he was present at the council meeting of December 11, 1728, and Governor William Gooch reported Beverley's death to the Board of Trade on March 26, 1729.

Although Beverley had no sons who reached adulthood, his grandchildren continued to assert important roles in Virginia. His grandson Peyton Randolph, became speaker of the Virginia House of Burgesses, chairman of the Virginia Conventions, and the first president of the Continental Congress; his great-grandson Beverley Randolph, became the eighth governor of Virginia. His granddaughter Elizabeth Whiting married John Clayton, a distinguished botanist and long-serving clerk of Gloucester County.

While one of William and John Randolph's brothers (Richard) married a lineal descendant of Pocahontas and later marriages among Randolph cousins linked Randolph descendants to her legacy, Peyton Randolph was not her descendant.
