= Jonathan Plowman Jr. =

American revolutionary (1717–1795)

Jonathan Plowman Jr. (1717–1795) was a spy and a privateer during the American Revolutionary War. His spying activities were as part of a group of Revolutionaries who reported on British troop movements. After the war broke out and trade with Britain was halted, Plowman and other merchants of Baltimore became privateers. They took their merchant ships and sent them out to raid and plunder British commerce enriching themselves and Baltimore. His resistance to British rule began earlier than that when, as a prominent merchant in Baltimore, Jonathan Plowman Jr. signed the non-importation agreement along with other merchants throughout the 13 colonies in a united effort to resisted British taxation. His sons fought against British forces on the battlefield as members of both the regular army and the Maryland Militia. Jonathan Plowman Jr's many accomplishments ranged from a town commissioner member, an attorney, and justice of the peace.

He was also a Freemason and a developer laying out streets and lots and having the land added to Baltimore. Most of all he was a successful merchant, and owned at least one ship named Pokomoke and trading in goods including indentured servants. Plowman's own father was shipped to the United States at age 12 as an indentured servant. Jonathan Plowman Jr. became a member of the town commission of Baltimore, Maryland, prior to and served during the American Revolution. Many references to Jonathan Plowman may be found in the Maryland Archives, as he participated in town business and ran afoul of the British more than once. Jonathan Plowman Jr. usually signed "Jon" Plowman on documents such as the records of the many indentured servants he imported to the Americas.

== Father's arrival in America ==
January 27, 1701 (1700 O.S.), Liverpool, England a young 12-year-old Jonathan Plowman of Yorkshire, England found himself boarding the ship Robert and Elizabeth as an indentured servant the ship's captain known as a 'Master' was Ralph Williamson. The ship was bound for Jamestown, Virginia. Records from Jamestown, Virginia do not record his landing there. It wasn't uncommon for ships to not sale out of every single indentured servant and so the ship would move on to other colonial cities such as Baltimore, Maryland. At age 12 he may not have been a very attractive indentured servant. The next record of Jonathan Plowman Sr. is in Baltimore County, Maryland. Once in Baltimore County he met Ann Stevenson Vickory, a widow two years younger than him who also was born in England. She had a young son named Richard Stevenson Vickory(bef 1711-1737) from her first marriage to John Vickory then deceased. They were married in February 1713 O.S. (1714 N.S.). One year later on February 22, 1714 O.S. (1715 N.S.)they had their first child together, a daughter named Rachael Plowman who would go on to marry her cousin Richard King Stevenson. On February 25, 1716 O.S. (1717 N.S.) their son and subject of this article Jonathan Plowman was born. A third child, a son named John Vickory Plowman, was born about 1718. On March 30, 1747 at age 59 Jonathan Plowman Sr. died. By this time Jonathan Plowman had started his own business as a merchant in the newly created town of Baltimore established in 1729.

(Note: Dates marked O.S. for Old Style are from the Julian calendar which applies for dates before September 1752. Our current Gregorian calendar system for dates after September 1752 when Britain and its colonies around the world adopted it is translated for dates predating this by N.S. or new style.)

== Early life ==
Jonathan Jr. was born in 1717, the same year a law of prejudice was passed imposing a tax of £20 shilling tax per Irish servant called Papist. The sole purpose of the law was to limit Irish immigrants, but Jonathan Plowman obviously was not influenced by this since his best friend and business partner Dr. John Stevenson was born in Ireland. By age 11 (1728) Jonathan Plowman was most likely sent out by his parents to kill squirrels and crows. The local government, in an effort to encourage the elimination of animals considered pests, including wolves, squirrels and crows, required every taxable person to produce three scalps or crow's heads to the justice of the peace or be taxed 2 pounds of tobacco per missing scalp. By age 12 (1729) Jonathan would witness the founding of the town of Baltimore on the northern side of the Patapsco River. 60 acres (240,000 m^{2}) divided into 60 lots and divided by streets. He may have even been picking out where he would put his merchant business some day. At age 13 he would have gotten to witness the construction of St. Paul's Episcopal Church, the church where 10 years later he would marry.

== Maryland Militia service ==
In the mid-1760s at nearly 40 years of age he participated in the Maryland Militia. In the Maryland archives appears a request to pay Jonathan Plowman for his service on the Frontier dated January 20, 1767. This would be at the time right after the French and Indian War during a time when the Indians AKA Native Americans were quite upset over the loss of their ally the French. There were countless skirmishes between English colonist and the Natives.

== Marriage and children ==
In August 1740 Jonathan Plowman married Elizabeth Crull at St. Paul's Church in Baltimore. St. Paul's was at the time the church in Baltimore where one would go to have a big public wedding. The church, which is still standing, was located on the highest point overlooking the harbor and was described as a "choice piece of property". Nine years later, and two years after the death of his father, Jonathan Plowman and Elizabeth had their joy restored with the birth of their first child, Stevenson Plowman, on June 27, 1749. His best friend was Dr. John Stevenson and his mother's maiden was also Stevenson, but no relation is thought to exist. Several more sons would follow starting two years later on September 24, 1751, when James Plowman was born. James would go on to serve in the Revolution in the Hand in Hand 4th Battalion 33rd class for the state of Maryland. Three years later, on February 13, 1754, Jonathan III named for his father and grandfather was born. A couple years later, Richard Plowman was born on December 23, 1756. Richard also served during the Revolutionary War as an Ensign belonging to the Soldiers Delight Battalion of the Militia in Baltimore County. Some 2½ years later on March 12, 1759 another son was born whom they named Edward Plowman. Sometime later at an unknown date they would see the birth of their youngest son John, named for his uncle, and finally the birth of their only girl Sarah.

== Merchant and land developer ==
During the 1750s and 1760s Jonathan Plowman and Dr. John Stevenson were the leading suppliers of indentured servants to Hampton Mansion. Through the 1750s and 1760s Jonathan Plowman signed "Jon Plowman" on the receipts of the many indentured servants that arrived in America from England. In the book "History of Baltimore City and County" it refers to Jonathan Plowman calling him a "variety store-keep" Besides the merchant business, he also did land deals. His brother John Plowman was also involved in some of these land deals as well as having his own land deals. Stevenson was the best friend and had the same last name as Jonathan Plowman's mother. Stevenson did not arrive in America until 1734 at age 16 from Ireland. Ann Vickory Stevenson, Jonathan Plowman's mother, was born in England in 1690. There is a slight outside chance they would be related, but it can't be substantiated.

== Charitable works including donation of land for church ==
Jonathan Plowman, a God-fearing man and devout Christian as most were in that time, donated land to establish a church near Baltimore. The Particular Baptist Gunpowder Church was established after the donation of this land on February 27, 1770. Jonathan Plowman conveyed to pastor John Davis, John Whitaker and Samuel Lane, Particular Baptists, a parcel of land, containing 15 acres (61,000 m^{2}), for the sole use of a meeting house for the worship of God, forever. This fact was recounted in an act the state of Maryland passed on January 22, 1829 to incorporate Particular Baptist Gunpowder Church in Baltimore County. In the 1850s Jonathan Plowman's grandson Joshua Plowman member of Black Rock Particular Baptist Church was appointed as one of the trustees to oversee the sale of the land which Jonathan Plowman Jr. had donated to build the Particular Baptist Gunpowder Church. The church meeting house had fallen down and the congregation broken up and all the appointed trustees were dead. Maryland legislator approved an act to allow the take over by Black Rock Baptist Church the nearest church of the same faith to sell the property and use the funds from the sale for its own needs.

On July 16, 1763, Plowman and others organized a lottery to raise 510 pounds for completing the market house, buy two fire engines and a parcel of land to enlarge the wharf and build a new one.

In April 1767, Jonathan Plowman was part of a mission of mercy. Francophone settlers living in the town of Fredrick town and having been neutral during the French and Indian War now found themselves persecuted by their Anglophone neighbors. The 200 men, women and mostly children wanted to leave for French settlements on the Mississippi River. They did not have the means to pay for the trip. The ships Virgin and Pocomoke owned by Jonathan Plowman and Peter Hulbert were used on the voyage to transport the 200 passengers and baggage. The voyage was publicly funded as a mission of mercy. The text does not identify which ship belonged to Jonathan Plowman and which to Peter Hulbert.

== Baltimore town commissioner ==
In 1773, Plowman was appointed a town commissioner as part of a bigger deal to add 80 acres (320,000 m^{2}) of land on the east and southeast side of the then borders of the town of Baltimore.

The commissioners of the said Baltimore-town, and Jonathan Plowman, Isaac Vanbebber, and John Deaver, who are hereby appointed commissioners for the purposes herein mentioned, or the major part of them, do, with the consent of the proprietors of the said eighty acres of land or thereabouts, by virtue of this act, at any time they shall see convenient before the twentieth day of October next, cause the said eighty acres of land or thereabouts, to be surveyed, and laid out into lots, streets, lanes and alleys, in such manner as to them shall seem convenient; and any person or persons that shall build or improve on the said eighty acres of land or thereabouts, after the same shall be laid out into lots, as by former laws relating to the said town are directed, and purchase the same from the proprietor or proprietors.

== His personal conflict with the British ==
Plowman is listed among the bachelors of Baltimore Town age twenty five and older, who were taxed by the Maryland Assembly to pay for the French and Indian War. On June 22, 1769, Jonathan Plowman was one of the signers of Maryland's Resolution of Non-Importation, in which he and other merchants like him promised, along with other colonies, to avoid importing items that were being taxed by Act of Parliament, for the purpose of raising a revenue in America. With few exceptions, they were to avoid purchasing most things listed as from Britain or Europe except for those produced and manufactured in Ireland.

In October 1770 the Maryland General Assembly in Annapolis ordered the arrest of Jonathan Plowman and several others for failing to show up to explain why they signed a petition that was offensive to the Assembly. The petition was against the enactment of a law to hold Baltimore's election in the town of Joppa. Smallpox was raging in Baltimore, so instead of delaying or taking other measures insuring the right to vote, the Assembly instead moved the election for Baltimore away from Baltimore. Many would therefore be unable to vote for their own town's government. The Assembly decided to swing around its power and ordered all the signers to come to Annapolis to explain their signatures on what they called a "false and scandalous Petition that reflected on the Honour, Justice and Impartiality of the House and highly derogatory of its Rights and Privileges." One decided to go and say "not me I was in Pennsylvania at the time," while another said he was in bed sick and the wife brought the petition for his signature and signed it because others had signed it first. Jonathan Plowman apparently did not go, at least not at the time ordered and what happened to this warrant is still being investigated by a genealogist, but we do know that he would continue on to yet another confrontation with Britain and have George Washington's help.

== George Washington helps Jonathan Plowman ==
In 1771 the British would take one of Jonathan's ships for an infraction most likely involving the importation of items that hadn't been "stamp" taxed or one of the many items the British prohibited the colony's to import or export. George Washington was asked to intercede on Jonathan Plowman Jr's behalf by the Honorable Daniel Dulany Esq, who had been mayor of Annapolis from 1764-1765. The letter to Neil Jameson reads:

Annapolis, September 24, 1771.

Sir: At the particular request of the Honble Danl. Dulany Esq., I address this Letter to you, a certain Mr. Plowman of Baltimore has, unfortunately, had his Vessel seized by the Boston Frigate, if it should be condemned, I have to request the favour of you to facilitate the purchase of it and render any Service you can in behalf of the proprietor. I have no great right to take this Liberty, but you will be good enough, I hope, to excuse the freedom taken by Sir, etc.... George Washington

Original copy of the letter may be seen at http://memory.loc.gov/mss/mgw/mgw8a/124/0000/0011.jpg

== Justice of the peace ==
Another passage found in the Maryland archives tells the story of Robert Moreton, a customs/tax collector. Apparently the merchants of Baltimore did not like the fact that he seized the cargo and ship Speedwell. The story is that the ship Speedwell came up from Turk Islands and apparently against Moreton's order began to unload, because of the merchant's insistence to get the goods ashore. Moreton then informed the Captain that he had just forfeited the ship and cargo and went to Annapolis to file the papers. Upon Moreton's return a great number of merchants and masters of vessels came down to the boat with clubs and staves with intention to kill, and on that night tarred and feathered two men, who occasionally worked with Moreton, and brought them to Moreton's door with torches in their hands, and made them damn all custom house officers. At the same time the mob broke the door down, broke the windows, and forced Mrs. Moreton to take them all over the house and cellar to see if they could find Mr. Moreton. They searched every house for Moreton with their faces being black'd and disguised in sailors' jackets and trousers, but most of them were the principal merchants in Baltimore and Fells Point. When they could not find Moreton, they beat a drum and played a fife up to town, beating the men all the way there, and then they tied one to the stern of a boat and towed him along until he was nearly drowned. On Friday April 30, 1773 Mrs. Moreton dispatched a letter by a messenger to Annapolis which upon receipt in the evening of the same day Moreton saw the Governor, filling him in, and praying his protection and support. The Governor gave him a letter addressed to "Mr. Plowman a Merchant and a Justice of the Peace at Baltimore –" The Mob assembled again on May 1, 1773 set on burning down the house. A gentleman took pity and argued not to hurt the wife and innocent children so they put aside their intentions, but they did decide to tar and feather that man and drag him through the water instead. Moreton did return to Baltimore, but because his house was being watched Moreton went to a friend's home outside town who hid him. Mrs. Morton sent for Jonathan Plowman, and gave him the letter written by the Governor. Jonathan Plowman went to the coffee house and read it to the town. Afterwards Mr. Plowman returned with several others and told her that her husband could come home. But she told her husband not to since people still looked for him even forcing the Marshal to come look for him because they would tar and feather him if he didn't. Mr. Moreton fled to Boston, but then missed a court date to testify against one John Pitts for shooting Mr. Ross the gaoler. A side note is that his best friend and business partner Dr. John Stevenson was also an appointed justice of the peace.

== Revolution ==
July 29, 1776 most likely included town commissioner Jonathan "Jon" Plowman with his boys, who were old enough for military service, listening to the reading of the Declaration of Independence when it arrived in Baltimore and was read to the town. His boys went to serve James in the regulars and Richard with the Militia. Stevenson, Jonathan III and Edward surely served as well being of age. Congress assembled in Baltimore on 26 December of this year because the capital, Philadelphia, was in British hands.

Historians have recorded that the Merchants of Baltimore including Jonathan Plowman Jr. made their ships into privateers and enriched them and the town with the spoils of British commerce.

By 1778 the colonists of Baltimore gathered to sign a declaration of allegiance to the United States of America. Jonathan Plowman signed proudly as did his sons on hand. Some were away serving the cause and names were simply written in; now the DAR (Daughters of the Revolution) won't accept this as proof of service. This same year many factories were established in and around the Baltimore area to provide the goods that the merchants like Plowman could no longer get from abroad and had been prohibited from making in the Americas by the British. Life for merchants such as Jonathan Plowman was hard, with a requirement to register their ships in Annapolis before leaving or arriving in Baltimore. In 1780 they finally rectified this hardship with a Customs Office in Baltimore.

In September 1781, General George Washington passed through Baltimore, on his way to Yorktown; on which occasion the town was illuminated, and an address presented on behalf of the citizens. Jonathan Plowman and his fellow merchants stepped in again when, on the march south, Lafayette's detachment passed through so destitute that a £2000 credit from the merchants was given to obtain clothing for them on Lafayette's account. The ladies were, as usual, active in the matter, and the detachment was soon comfortably clad. On February 6, 1782 Richard Plowman Ensign, belonging to the Soldiers Delight Battalion of Militia in Baltimore County, along with others were on hand at the assembly to collect the Battalion's pay. On April 21, 1783, a suspension of hostilities with Great Britain was celebrated by all.

== The family after the war ==
1783 tax rolls for Baltimore show how well Jonathan Plowman and his family were doing. All were listed in the BA Pipe Creek Hundred. Twenty-four-year-old son Edward owned 196 acres (79 ha) in the aptly named Plowman's Park. Thirty-two-year-old son James owned 150 acres (61 ha) in Jonathan's Meadow. Son John owned 180 acres (73 ha) in Plowman's Fancy. Son Jonathan Plowman III, 29, owned 196 acres (79 ha) and Jonathan Plowman himself owned 339 acres (137 ha) also in Plowman's Park. Seems to show that many of his sons had gone into the family business of developing land. Son Richard would show up in Pennsylvania's tax records owning 100 acres (40 ha) in 1789 in Huntingdon County. From 1800 on more of the family would move to Pennsylvania as well spreading across Huntingdon, Blair and Bedford County, most living in or near the cities of Altoona and Holidaysburg. Many descendants still live there. Thomas Price Plowman would move to Kansas and had nieces and nephews follow later as well. Some family members remained in Baltimore and would fight to defend the town from the British once again during the War of 1812.

The 1790 census finds four Plowman heads of household all living in the Patapsco lower hundred. Sons Edward, James, and Jonathan Plowman III who is misidentified as an Also Jonathan Plowman is listed as a head of household.

Jonathan Plowman died at age 78 in October 1795.
