= Nathaniel Burwell (burgess) =

Nathaniel Burwell (Sr.)

Member of the Virginia House of Burgesses representing Gloucester County
- In office 1720-1721 Serving with Henry Willis
- Preceded by: Thomas Buckner
- Succeeded by: Giles Cook

Member of the Virginia House of Burgesses representing Jamestown
- In office 1710-1712
- Preceded by: Robert Beverley Jr.
- Succeeded by: Edward Jaquelin

Personal details
- Born: 1680 Carters Creek, Gloucester County, Colony of Virginia
- Died: 1721 (aged 40–41)
- Spouse: Elizabeth Carter
- Children: Lewis Burwell III, Carter Burwell, Robert Burwell
- Occupation: planter, politician

Military service
- Branch/service: Virginia militia

Nathaniel Burwell (circa 1680 – 1721) was a Virginia planter who twice served in the House of Burgesses, first representing Jamestown and later Gloucester County.

== Early life ==
The eldest son of Lewis Burwell II and his wife, the former Abigail Smith, was baptized on October 14, 1680. His parents were of the First Families of Virginia and operated large plantations (increasingly using enslaved labor) as well as had considerable political power. His brothers James Burwell and Lewis Burwell III also served in the House of Burgesses. Their sisters including Elizabeth (1677-1734) who married planter and eventually Speaker Benjamin Harrison of Berkeley plantation in Charles City County, Lucy (1683–1716) who married Edmund Berkeley of the Council of State, Martha (1685-after 1710) who married Burgess Henry Armistead after arousing the passions of Governor Francis Nicholson, and another Martha (1703-1738) who married Burgess John Martin of Clifton in Caroline County.

== Career ==
This Nathaniel Burwell lived at his main plantation at Carter's Creek in Gloucester County, having married Elizabeth Carter, the daughter of Robert "King" Carter. Through his mother, he inherited part of Colonel Nathaniel Bacon's estate, possibly including a town lot in Jamestown (then considered the equivalent to a "rotten borough" in England, the government seat having moved to less pestilential Williamsburg in 1699). Jamestown voters elected this Nathaniel Burwell to represent them (part-time) in the House of Burgesses in the 1710-1712 session, but did not re-elect him. Gloucester County voters elected him as one of their part-time burgesses in 1720, but he died before the 1722 term of that session. Burwell served as justice of the peace in Gloucester County from 1714-1719.

== Personal life ==
He married Elizabeth Carter, who bore Lewis Burwell, Carter Burwell and Robert Burwell (all of whom also served in the legislature) as well as Lucy (b. 1715), Elizabeth (b. 1718) who married William Nelson, and a posthumous daughter who soon died. Somewhat complicating matters, his younger brother James Burwell of Kings Creek plantation in York County named his firstborn son Nathaniel Bacon Burwell.

== Death and legacy ==
He died in 1721 and his will was admitted to probate on October 25, 1821. His widow remarried, to Dr. George Nicholas, and died in 1734.
