= Archibald Blair (burgess) =

American politician (1665–1733)

Member of the House of Burgesses from Jamestown, Colony of Virginia
- In office 1728-1733
- Preceded by: William Broadnax Jr.
- Succeeded by: John Blair Sr.

Member of the House of Burgesses from James City County, Colony of Virginia
- In office 1720-1726 Serving with John Clayton
- Preceded by: William Broadnax
- Succeeded by: John Eaton

Member of the House of Burgesses from Jamestown, Colony of Virginia
- In office 1718
- Preceded by: William Broadnax
- Succeeded by: John Clayton

Personal details
- Born: c. 1665 Scotland
- Died: March 4, 1733 (aged 67–68) Williamsburg, Virginia
- Resting place: Bruton Parish
- Children: 10, including John Blair, Jr.
- Relatives: James Blair (brother); John Blair Sr. (brother)
- Education: University of Edinburgh
- Occupation: physician, merchant, politician, planter

Archibald Blair (c. 1665 – March 4, 1733) was a Scottish-born physician, merchant, planter and politician. Born in Roxburghshire, he moved to the English colony of Virginia in the 1690s. Blair served in the House of Burgesses multiple times, alternately representing the colony's capital and surrounding county. He may be confused with a distant collateral relative, Archibald Blair, who became clerk of the Virginia Governor's Council in 1776 and served for more than 25 years.

== Early and family life ==
The youngest of three sons of Rev. Peter Blair, rector of Jedburgh parish in Roxburghshire, Scotland. His father had previously served at St. Cuthbert's parish in Edinburgh, where in 1654 he married Mary Hamilton. His eldest brother, Rev. James Blair had followed their father's career path, studying to become a minister at the University of Edinburgh and becoming ordained, but his career became derailed during Scotland's religious strife, when he refused to sign a loyalty oath demanded by the Scots parliament. Rev. Blair instead emigrated to the Virginia colony, where in addition to his religious duties (and later political responsibilities), and convincing this brother to join him in the colony, he re-founded the College of William and Mary in Williamsburg. Rev. James Blair served as the commissary (emissary) of the Bishop of London in the Virginia colony for more than five decades and married into the First Families of Virginia in 1687, two years after his arrival in the colony. His 17 year old wife Sarah was the daughter of Col. Benjamin Harrison of Wakefield plantation in Surry County, as well as the sister-in-law of prominent merchant and planter Philip Ludwell Jr., who became one of this man's business partners. Although the minister's marriage produced no children before her death in 1713 (and historians suspect it was unhappy), Rev. Blair never remarried in the three decades before his own death, when he bequeathed much of his estate to this man's son, as well as made charitable bequests. Their middle brother, John Blair (ca. 1662-after 1689) remained in Scotland where he became an apothecary in Edinburgh, a burgess of that city in 1683 and Scotland's postmaster general in 1689;. Some of his descendants would later emigrate to Virginia, particularly his grandsons (by his non-emigrating sons Peter who was a skinner and another Archibald), John Blair (d.1757) who became a merchant in York County with this man's son. The other grandson, James Blair would assist this man both as a merchant and as deputy auditor of the royal revenue in Williamsburg (and was the father of both John Blair who died in the American Revolutionary War and the Archibald Blair who succeeded this man's grandson as clerk of the Governor's Council). Only one of their sisters (Christian Blair (1665–1725)) would also emigrate to Virginia (after marrying Rev. John Munroe, who accepted a post at St. John's Parish in King William County). Archibald Blair also graduated from the University of Edinburgh in 1685, where he studied medicine.

Dr. Blair first married an Englishwoman (name unknown) who bore John Blair Sr., who like his father became important in the Virginia colony, although no record exists of his mother's emigration to Virginia. In Virginia, Dr. Blair first married the widow Sarah Archer Fowler, who probably bore the rest of his children, including daughters who became the main beneficiary's of their father's will: Sarah Blair who married Wilson Cary, Ann Blair who married Peter Whiting, Elizabeth Blair who married John Bolling and later Richard Bland, and Harrison Blair who became the third wife of Dr. George Gilmer. Dr. Blair's third wife was Mary Wilson Roscoe Cary, the daughter of burgess William Wilson and who had outlived burgesses William Roscoe as well as Miles Cary II (who died in 1709). They seem not to have had children together, although she would outlive this doctor husband by more than a decade.

== Career in Virginia ==
Dr. Blair immigrated with his son John Blair Sr. to the Virginia colony in the 1690s, possibly following his wife's death, since no re record exists of her emigration. Due to unhealthy circumstances at Jamestown, particularly during summers, Williamsburg was established as a trading center, and the colony's government offices ultimately relocated there.

Dr. Archibald Blair became a prominent physician in the colony's capital, and possibly one of the best in the colony, as well as a prominent merchant and planter. Archibald operated an apothecary shop in Williamsburg and had interests in two mercantile establishments. His social status increased with his remarriages, as husbands of that era controlled their wives' estate, even such from a previous marriage. In 1710, some of Dr. Blair's slaves were implicated in an escape plot. In 1723, Dr. Blair was still conducting business on behalf of Mary's first husband's estate, and she also had a dower interest in her second husband's town lot at Jamestown.

In 1718 Dr. Blair became a vestryman of Bruton parish (where his brother Rev. James Blair served as rector) and served in that capacity until at least 1721. He also collected tithes for the parish between 1722 and 1732. He helped found the town of Williamsburg, and became one of its original aldermen.

In 1728 Dr. Blair became a justice of the peace as well as major in the York County militia, York County adjoining James City County and so was close to the colonial capital. Dr. Archibald Blair also served in the House of Burgesses, winning elections at various times to represent Jamestown or the surrounding James City County. He was also nominated for a seat on the Governor's Council, but was not actually appointed, possibly because his brother Rev. James BLair also sat in that body, or because Rev. Blair vigorously defended colonial interests against successive royally appointed executives, particularly Lt. Gov. Edmond Andros, Governor Francis Nicholson and Lt. Governor Alexander Spotswood.

== Death and legacy ==
Dr. Archibald Blair died in Williamsburg in March 1733, before the 1734 session of the House of Burgesses began its business, and was succeeded in that body by his son John, who not only rose to a seat on the Governor's Council after his uncle's death, but served as its presiding officer (hence family members sometimes distinguished him as "President Blair'). Many successive generations of his family married into the First Families of Virginia, as well as honored him by re-using his name. For example, the clerk Archibald Blair (1753–1824), who lived in Richmond, named his sons John H. Blair (1787–1827), Beverley Blair (1789–1857) and Archibald Blair (1793–1860). This man's third wife and widow, Mary Wilson Roscoe Cary Blair, died in 1741, and his brother Rev. James Blair in 1743. Both Dr. and Mary Blair are buried in the historic Bruton Church graveyard in Williamsburg.

Three buildings associated with Dr. Blair or family members survive today in the part of Colonial Williamsburg now on the National Register of Historic Places.
