= John Clayton (botanist) =

American colonial botanist (1694–1773)

John Clayton Esq.
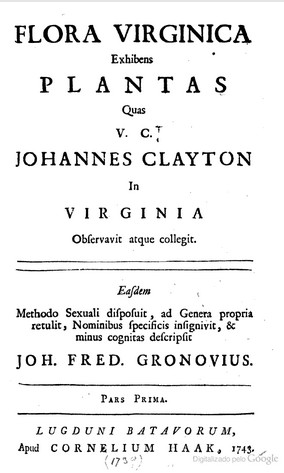
- Title page of Flora Virginica
- Born: 1694 or August 1695; England
- Died: December 15, 1773 (aged 77–78); Colony of Virginia
- Occupations: Priest, County clerk, botanist
- Notable work: Flora Virginica
- Spouse: Elizabeth Whiting
- Children: 8 children

John Clayton (1694/5–1773) was an Anglican clergyman, a clerk, and a botanist in the Colony of Virginia. He may be confused with several distant family members, including Rev. John Clayton who served as minister at Jamestown (1682–1684) and conducted various scientific experiments, before returning to England (although his papers and specimens were lost at sea during that voyage).

== Early and personal life ==
This John Clayton was born in England and is believed to have moved to Virginia around 1715 with his father, also named John Clayton, who later served as one of the Attorneys General for colonial Virginia.

Rev. Clayton married Elizabeth Whiting, granddaughter of Peter Beverley. His final will names three daughters (Mary, Catherine and Lucy) and five sons, as well as granddaughters and grandsons. The most distinguished of them was William Clayton, who served for decades as clerk of the New Kent County court as well as a burgess, the first session of the Virginia House of Delegates and on the Virginia Ratifying Convention. This man's daughter Mary married Patrick Henry and his son Jasper Clayton (d. 1779) died in the American Revolutionary War. His son Robert and another daughter Mary also died before their father. Other brothers were John Clayton (the eldest), and Thomas Clayton. James William Clayton served as the Hanover County clerk from 1720 to 1735.

== Career ==
This John Clayton's first appearance in colonial records was on October 7, 1720, when he was identified as a clerk in Gloucester County. After emigrating to the colony, he came the assistant to Peter Beverley, then the county clerk. He succeeded his mentor and served for 53 years, but many records were lost in courthouse fires (although the courthouse built during his tenure, possibly in 1766, to replace the second burned courthouse still stands today, as the namesake of the Gloucester County Courthouse Square Historic District). Clayton bought 450 acres in Ware Parish and built a plantation home which he called "Windsor", about a mile from the Piankatank River and bordered the east side of Wadinger Creek. Today it is located in Mathews County, created from Gloucester County in 1790.

== Botany ==
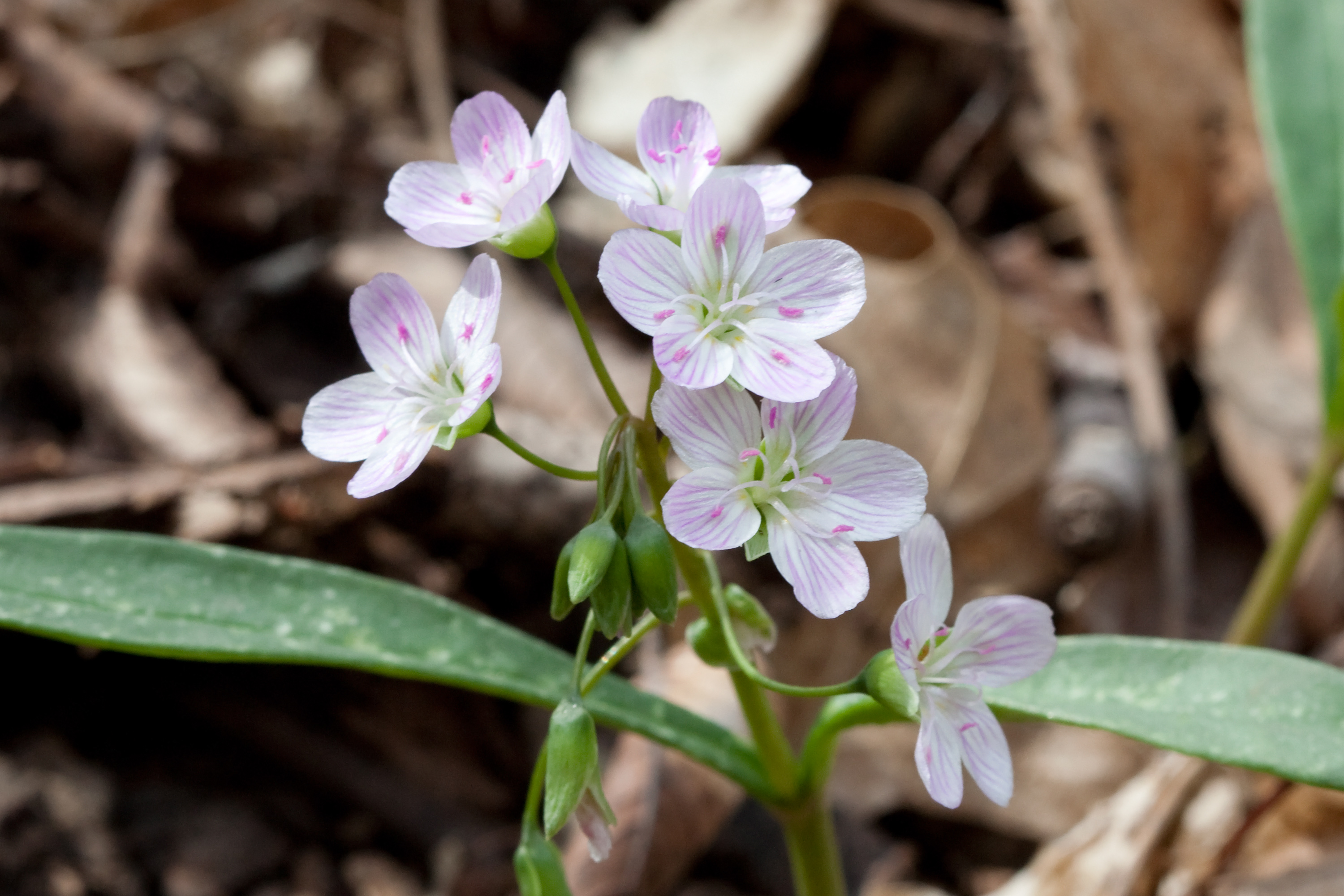
Claytonia virginica at Radnor Lake in Tennessee

Clayton explored the Gloucester County region botanically and in 1734 sent many specimens and manuscript descriptions to the English naturalist Mark Catesby, who then sent them on to the Dutch botanist Jan Frederik Gronovius. Clayton would also send work to Gronovius directly. John Bartram visited Clayton in Gloucester County as part of Bartram's 1000-mile journey through Virginia in 1738.

Unprepared for the amount of material sent to him, Gronovius enlisted the help of the Swedish botanist Carl Linnaeus. Unbeknownst to Clayton, Gronovius would later use much of Clayton's specimen and manuscript work in his 1739 book Flora Virginica without seeking his permission. Whether or not Gronovius properly credited Clayton in the work is the subject of debate, as some felt that Gronovius greatly downplayed his contributions. However, in 1975 William T. Stearn stated that Gronovius was the true author of the work, as he had performed quite a bit of work with the material prior to the publication of Flora Virginica and that "but for Gronovius's publication Clayton's work would lack modern relevance." A second part of Flora Virginica was published in 1743 with additional information. Clayton sought to publish his own version of Flora Virginica but was unable to find a publisher before a second edition of Gronovius's book was printed in 1762. His manuscript is believed to have been lost, likely in a 1787 fire in the New Kent County clerk's office where the papers were being stored.

Clayton's work was also studied by the European botanist George Clifford and Linnaeus later named a flower in Clayton's honor, a common eastern North American wildflower, the spring beauty, Claytonia virginica.The specimens sent to Gronovius were later collected by Joseph Banks and the material is now part of the Natural History Museum in London and makes up the John Clayton Herbarium.

== Honors, death and legacy ==
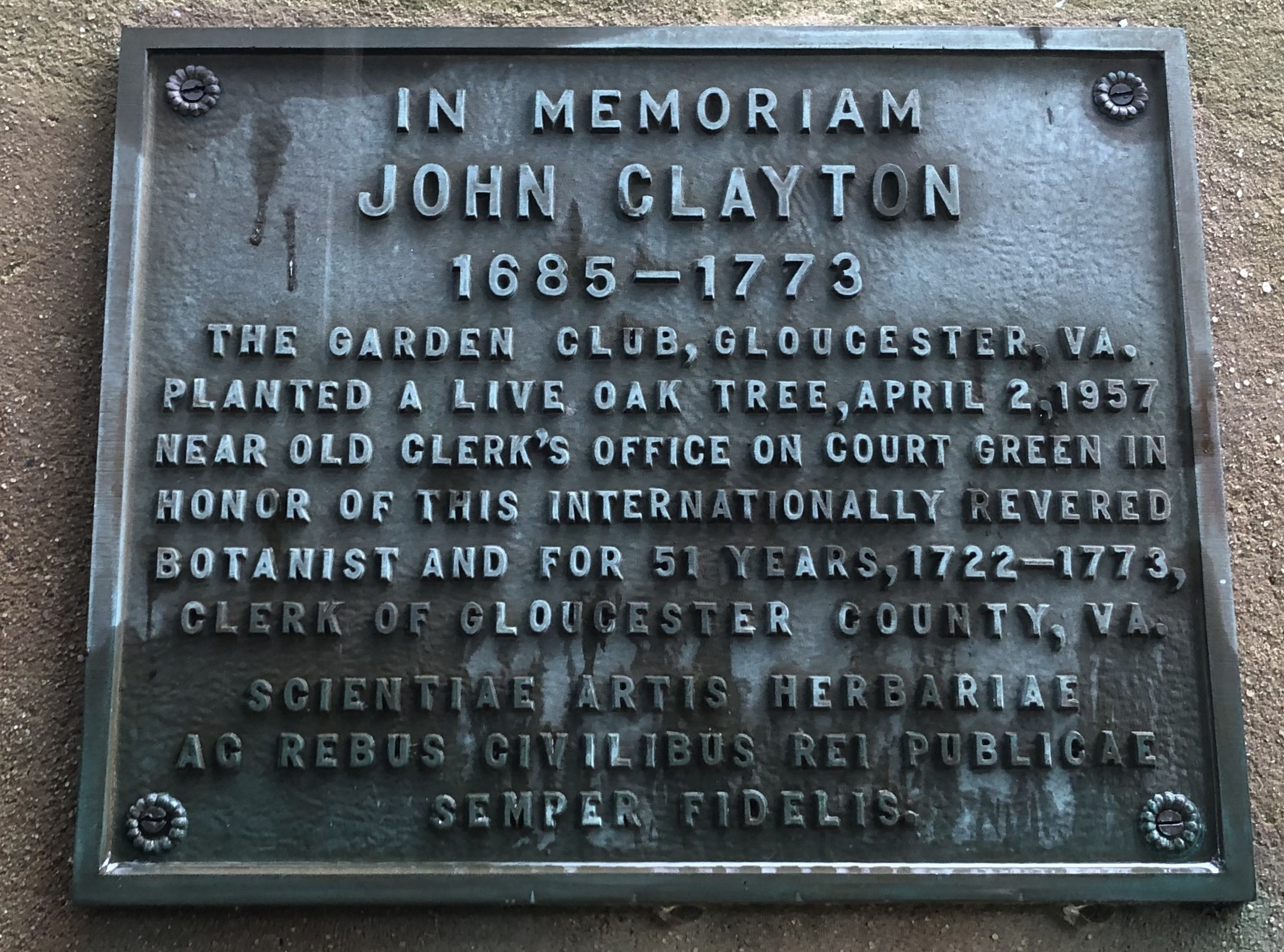
John Clayton plaque, Gloucester County

Clayton was elected to the original American Philosophical Society in 1744. Upon Linnaeus' recommendation, Clayton was elected a member of the Swedish Royal Academy of Science on May 3, 1747. Shortly before his death, the Virginia Gazette published a notice that Clayton was named president of the Society for the Advancement of Useful Knowledge, a considerable honor. Clayton died, still serving as Gloucester county clerk, on December 15, 1773. Unfortunately, many of his papers were stored by his son William in a building near the New Kent County Courthouse, and burned during an arson fire in 1787.

In 1951, the Virginia State Library erected a historical marker to mark Clayton's home, which was in Mathews County (created from GLoucester County after his death), near the community of North. It is located north of Virginia State Route 14, now known as the John Clayton Memorial Highway.

An iconic early mid-Atlantic wildflower species, colloquially known as the "spring beauty" is a member of the genus named to honor this early botanist.
