= Edward Ambler =

Virginia planter and politician (1733–1766)

Member of the Virginia House of Burgesses representing Jamestown
- In office 1766-1768
- Preceded by: John Ambler
- Succeeded by: Champion Travis Jr.

Personal details
- Born: December 31, 1733 Jamestown, Colony of Virginia
- Died: May 27, 1766 (aged 32) Williamsburg, Virginia
- Resting place: Jamestown Churchyard
- Spouse: Mary Cary Ambler
- Relations: John Ambler (burgess), Jaquelin Ambler (brothers)
- Parent(s): Richard Ambler, Elizabeth Jaquelin,
- Education: Trinity College
- Occupation: Planter, politician

Edward Ambler (December 31, 1733 – October 29, 1768) was a Virginia planter and politician who represented Jamestown in the House of Burgesses before his relatively early death.

== Early life ==
The eldest son born to the former Elizabeth Jaquelin and her merchant husband Richard Ambler was born circa 1733, years after his merchant father married his heiress mother. Although his mother gave birth to six sons and three daughters, only three boys reached adulthood: this man, and his younger brothers John(1735-1766) and Jaquelin Ambler (1742-1798). His maternal grandfather, Edward Jaquelin had acquired much land on the western end of Jamestown Island (in part by marrying that heiress), and represented it in the House of Burgesses in the 1712-1714 session. Richard Ambler was a British merchant who traded primarily from his house in the port of Yorktown (where the York River enters the Hampton Roads area of Chesapeake Bay). He was also the tax collector for the York River area, as successively would be his sons. Like his younger brother John, Edward Ambler received an education appropriate to his class, primarily in England, possibly at Leeds Academy and Cambridge University. The youngest brother, who ultimately succeeded to the family business, Jaquelin Ambler, was educated at the College of William & Mary and later in Philadelphia.

== Career ==
Edward assisted his father in operating their mercantile business in Yorktown, as well as expanded his family's landholdings. Later he took up residence in a brick mansion his father had erected in Jamestown, after it caught fire and half was destroyed at the end of his brother's life. Two outbuildings burned to the ground two months after this man's death, and a valuable male slave died while attempting to save some of his belongings. As had his grandfather Edward Jaquelin, father Richard Ambler and brother John, Edward Ambler farmed using enslaved labor, and in 1768 and 1769 his estate owned 1,050 acres of land and a large number of slaves.

Jamestown voters elected Ambler as their (part-time) representative in the House of Burgesses, to replace his late brother John, but he did not choose to continue that legislative career.

== Personal life ==
In 1754, Ambler married Mary Cary, the daughter of Colonel Wilson Cary (1702-1772) of Elizabeth City County, who is now known as a diarist. Edward Ambler was known for preferring red velvet suits trimmed with gold lace. Her brother Col. Wilson Miles Cary, the tax collector of the port of Hamp would become a noted patriot in the Revolutionary War before moving westward to Fluvanna County. She bore seven children, but only John and Sarah (1760-1782, who married William Hartwell Macon of New Kent County), survived to marry and have children, his elder brother Edward Cary Ambler drowning in 1775:

== Death and legacy ==
Edward Ambler suffered from a "tedious" undiagnosed illness in his final years, possibly tuberculosis like his brother, although Jamestown was also notoriously unhealthy in summers. He died in Williamsburg on October 29, 1768 and was buried at Jamestown, as ultimately would be his widow. Mary Cary Ambler lived until 1781. The American Revolutionary War devastated this family's Tidewater holdings during the final campaign and Siege of Yorktown. Mary Ambler took her children from Jamestown and rented their strategically important Jamestown home to Captain Edward Travis IV. She died at their Hanover County plantation known as "The Cottage" in May 1781, but specified that her remains be returned to Jamestown. She saved considerable family papers, now housed at the Library of Congress and at the Virginia Historical Society. Their son John inherited extensive holdings from his father, and married in 1782 after he reached legal age, but left the Jamestown mansion and plantation in favor of a home in Richmond's Shockoe district and an upriver plantation. One of his grandsons was also named Edward Ambler and became a James City County justice of the peace as well as participated in the War of 1812 before representing Henrico County in the Virginia House of Delegate 1824-1826 and continued westward to Lynchburg, but his step brother John Jaquelin Ambler would become the family's historian and relate the story of their departure from Jamestown.
