= John Blair Sr. =

American politician (1687–1771)

John Blair

Member of the Virginia Governor's Council
- In office 1740-1771

Member of the House of Burgesses from Williamsburg, Colony of Virginia
- In office 1736-1740
- Preceded by: John Clayton
- Succeeded by: John Harmer

Member of the House of Burgesses from Jamestown, Colony of Virginia
- In office 1734-1735
- Preceded by: Archibald Blair
- Succeeded by: Lewis Burwell

Personal details
- Born: c. 1687 Scotland
- Died: November 5, 1771 (aged 83–84) Williamsburg, Virginia
- Resting place: Bruton Parish
- Spouse: Mary Munro
- Children: 10, including John Blair, Jr.
- Relatives: James Blair (uncle)
- Education: College of William and Mary
- Occupation: Merchant; politician
- Known for: Justice of the Peace; Deputy Auditor General; Member House of Burgesses; Member Virginia Governor's Council; Acting Governor Virginia

John Blair (c. 1687 – November 5, 1771) was a merchant and politician of the colony of Virginia. He served in both houses of the Virginia General Assembly. As a member of the House of Burgesses, he initially represented Jamestown then Williamsburg (the successive seats of the colony's government), before being appointed to the Governor's Council. There he served for more than 25 years, including four times becoming acting governor during changes of the royal governors and while governor Francis Fauquier was in the New York and Georgia colonies. Nonetheless, this John Blair, the earliest of the four men of the name serving in the Virginia General Assembly, may be best known either as the nephew and heir of Rev. James Blair (who founded the College of William and Mary, where many descendants would be educated) or father of John Blair, Jr. (a lawyer who served in many governmental posts, including as a burgess, delegate to the Constitutional Convention, Virginia judge and finally as associate justice of the United States Supreme Court).

== Early life ==
Blair was born in Scotland around 1687, the only known son of Archibald Blair. His Scottish grandfather, Rev. Peter Blair, was minister at St. Cuthbert's parish in Edinburgh, married Mary Hamilton in 1654 and in his final years served as the rector of Jedburgh parish in Roxburghshire, Scotland. Archibald Blair was the youngest of the couple's three sons, had graduated from the University of Edinburgh in 1685 (having studied medicine) and probably married this man's mother shortly thereafter. Meanwhile, his eldest brother Rev. James Blair had previously graduated from that university and been ordained a minister, but emigrated to Virginia around 1685 because he refused to sign a loyalty oath required by the Scots parliament. In Virginia Rev. James Blair would become the leading representative of the Church of England for five decades, as well as the minister in the colony's capital, and helped found the College of William and Mary. Rev. James Blair soon married a daughter of a leading family, but had no children, so after his brother Archibald and this boy emigrated to the colony, and the son was educated and married, he and his family ultimately became that cleric's principal heirs. Only one of Archibald and James's sisters (Christian Blair (1665–1725)) also emigrated to Virginia (after marrying Rev. John Munroe, who accepted a post at St. John's Parish in King William County). Ultimately, this man would marry his cousin Mary, daughter of that Rev. John Monroe. The middle brother, John Blair (c. 1662 – after 1689) remained in Scotland, where he became an apothecary in Edinburgh and a burgess of that city in 1683 and Scotland's postmaster general in 1689. Some of his children also became merchants, including grandsons (by sons Peter the skinner and another Archibald) John Blair (died 1757) and another James Blair. Those men worked for years in Virginia as employees and at least the former became trading partner of this man.

Dr. Archibald Blair immigrated with this son to the Virginia colony in the 1690s, possibly following his wife's death, since no re record exists of her emigration. Due to unhealthy circumstances at Jamestown, particularly during summers, Williamsburg (at first called "Middle Plantation") was established as a trading center, and the colony's government offices relocated there around 1699. Dr. Archibald Blair remarried twice, first when this man was still a boy to Sarah Archer Fowler, a widow who probably helped raise this boy as well as bore four daughters who reached adulthood, married and became Archibald Blair's heirs. They included Sarah Blair who married Wilson Cary, Ann Blair who married Peter Whiting, Elizabeth Blair who married John Bolling and later Richard Bland, and Harrison Blair who became the third wife of Dr. George Gilmer. After Sarah's death Archibald remarried, to the twice widowed Mary Wilson Roscoe Cary, the daughter of burgess William Wilson and who had outlived burgesses William Roscoe as well as Miles Cary II (who died in 1709). as well as practiced as a doctor and operated an in Williamsburg. Archibald also joined with his brother James Blair and Philip Ludwell, who jointly owned a retail store in Williamsburg, which is discussed below, since upon coming of age, this man would succeed his father as its manager. This John Blair graduated from the College of William and Mary around 1707 and remained in Williamsburg his whole life.

== Businessman and planter ==
Until his death in 1733, Blair's father, Archibald, in addition to his medical practice and apothecary shop was the largest shareholder of Dr. Blair's Store, a mercantile house. This man managed the store for many years, probably succeeding his Edinburgh-born cousin of the same name. Blair was also a partner with John Blair Jr. (the son of a cousin) in another store from 1740 to 1759. Blair owned two of the largest taverns in the colony, the Raleigh Tavern (named after Sir Walter Raleigh) and the Chowning Tavern, renting them to tavern keepers. He owned Chowning from 1726 to around 1738, and sold Raleigh in 1742. In 1745, Blair and 16 other investors obtained a 1,000-acre (400 ha) land grant on the Potomac and Youghiogheny rivers. Upon receiving his inheritance from Rev. James Blair in 1743, this John Blair bought a plantation south of Taskinas Creek on the York River about ten miles downstream of its confluence with the Mattaponi River, which he operated using enslaved labor.

== Public career ==
Blair's public career may have begun in 1715, when he (or a cousin with the same name) was appointed keeper of the Royal Storehouse in Williamsburg. Blair took the oaths of office as a justice of the peace for York County on August 17, 1724 (serving until he was sworn in as a member of the Virginia Governor's Council in 1745) and in 1727 as a James River upper district naval officer (serving until he became deputy Auditor General of Virginia on August 15, 1728). He served as deputy Auditor General until his death in 1771, while simultaneously holding various other positions.

Blair was elected to the House of Burgesses from Jamestown for the 1734 session, succeeding his father, whose term had begun in 1728 and who died in 1733. In the next session, which began in 1736, the citizens of Williamsburg elected Blair as their representative, though he was replaced by John Harmer for the 1742 session, possibly because his nomination for Governor's Council was in process, as discussed below. While in office, Blair helped oversee the colonists' defense from attacks by Indians. From April 22, 1741, to October 15, 1741, he served as clerk of the Governor's Council. During part of that time, his uncle James Blair was the acting governor.

He is likely the John Blair who was Williamsburg's mayor in 1751.

Blair having inherited approximately £10,000 from his uncle James, Governor William Gooch now considered him qualified for a seat on the upper house of the colonial legislature, the Virginia Governor's Council and recommended to the king in February 1745 that he be appointed to fill a vacant seat. However, the king had already named Blair to fill a different vacancy on November 15, 1744. He was seated on August 6, 1745. He became the council's senior member or president in 1757 and served four times as Virginia's acting governor. The first was after the departure of Robert Dinwiddie, from January 12, 1758, to June 5, 1758, when Francis Fauquier arrived. The second time was in September and October 1761 when Fauquier was consulting with General Jeffery Amherst in New York. In 1763, Blair was acting governor when Fauquier was in the Province of Georgia in September to December. The final time was after Fauquier's death on March 4, 1768, until the arrival of his replacement, Norborne Berkeley on October 26, 1768.

Although appointed for life, he resigned on October 15, 1770, after the death of governor Berkeley. In poor health himself, he did not want to serve as acting governor again for the fifth time. He died the following year. Blair having a large family to support, the Council petitioned the king to grant Blair a pension. The king and Privy Council did not act before Blair's death.

=== Deputy Auditor General ===
Holding the position for 43 years, he was responsible for certifying the accuracy of official government revenue accounts, including quitrents and taxes on exported tobacco, then a major component of Virginia's agricultural production. Blair successfully improved procedures and records to prevent the evasion of paying quitrents. However, in his final years the efficacy of the office was poor, probably due to his failing health and the death of his assistant. Blair's son became the next deputy auditor general.

=== Governor's Council ===
In 1746, he voted to license Reverend Samuel Davies to preach in Williamsburg, one of the first non-Anglican ministers licensed in Virginia. This was not popular with the established church as Davies advanced the cause of religious and civil liberty and preached to religious dissenters against the Anglican Church.

=== Governor ===
During his first term as acting governor in 1758, he addressed the General Assembly on March 31 requesting that Virginia raise an additional regiment for offensive operations in the Ohio Valley against the New France forces in the French and Indian War, which was approved. Also approved was the issuance of £32,000 of treasury notes to fund defenses of the colony.

In 1768, Fauquier had intended to call the Assembly into session. After Fauquier died, Blair, again acting Governor, followed through with a session that closed in April at which time he sent to the king and Parliament the assembly's challenges, led by speaker Peyton Randolph of Parliament's right to tax the colonies. The response was the speedy appointment of Berkeley as new governor with instructions to quash such protests of the crown's authority over the colonies. Blair also urged Virginia's clergy to raise money to aid the victims of a fire in Old Montreal (then under British rule) that destroyed the Congregation Notre-Dame convent and 88 houses.

=== Other civic action ===
Blair served on a 1745 committee to revise the laws of Virginia, on a committee that oversaw the 1748–1753 rebuilding of the Capitol after it burned in 1747, and on another in 1763 to correspond with Virginia's London agent.

He was appointed to the Board of Trustees of the public hospital for lunatics established in 1769. Blair was the only participant in the bricklaying ceremonies for both of the Williamsburg Capitol buildings (in 1699 or 1701 and 1752 or 1754).

== Religious duty ==
Blair served as a vestryman of Bruton Parish, from around 1744 or earlier, and was a churchwarden about 1749. He was also a visitor of the College of William and Mary in 1758.

== Personal life ==
Blair married his first cousin Mary Munro about 1726. Munro, the daughter of the Reverend John and Christina Monro of St. John's Parish, King William County, was born circa 1708 and died in 1768 They had ten children, (Note: Another source says 12 children.) including eight daughters. Their fourth child and eldest surviving son, John Blair, Jr. became an associate justice of the United States Supreme Court. Their eldest daughter, Christian (1727–1784), married Armistead Burwell who was elected Burgess in 1753 –1754. Their next two children, Mary and James, never reached adulthood, then a second daughter Mary (1734–1799), survived at least two husbands, as well as continued the family line. On December 6, 1753, she married Colonel George Braxton, and while several of her children died as infants, son George Braxton IV and daughter Elizabeth (who would marry Henry Whiting and move to Jefferson County), survived their father, who died October 3, 1761. On December 31, 1774, she remarried, to Colonel R. Burwell, who died January 30, 1777. Her third marriage was on June 2, 1795, to Mr. R Prescott who died June 2, 1795. Her sisters Sarah Archer Blair and Ann Blair and brother Archibald Blair also died as children, but the next Sarah Blair (1737–1799) married Wilson-Miles Cary. One of their youngest daughters received the name Agan (Scottish for Anna) (1746–1813), and married Colonel John Banister. Another daughter was Elizabeth (Betsy), who married Captain/Commander/Admiral Thompson. His younger son Dr. James Blair studied medicine in Scotland, married Catherine Eustace in 1771 and shortly thereafter separated from his wife and died the next year. This led to a dower lawsuit between his estate and wife (Blair v Blair), involving his brother John as executor and Thomas Jefferson and Edmund Randolph as council. Some considered this matter a scandal.

== Death and legacy ==
John Blair Sr. died in Williamsburg on November 5, 1771, and was buried in Bruton Parish churchyard. In addition to his children and grandchildren, Blair's diary survived him. According to that, he loved gardening and maintained a garden with flowers, vegetables, and a fruit tree orchard. His family house, originally built circa 1747 and now known as the John Blair House, is now located on Duke of Gloucester Street in the National Register of Historic Places district living history museum of Colonial Williamsburg. The house is one of the oldest in Williamsburg, and was reconstructed in 1937. It features typical American colonial architecture, including hip roof dormers. The stone steps were imported from England. His Taskinas plantation passed to his son John Blair Jr., who was not a hands-on manager, but passed it on to his son in law Rev. James Henderson. It is now part of York River State Park.
