= John Stevenson (doctor) =

Scottish-American merchant and developer

John Stevenson (c. 1718 – March 23, 1785), a Scot, pioneer merchant and developer of Baltimore, Maryland, if not indeed its actual founder, was known as the "American Romulus." Records indicate that John Stevenson and his brother, Henry, also a medical doctor came to British North America from Ireland in 1734. On November 13, 1735, Stevenson married Mary Tipton; she died December 6, 1736.

== Merchant ==
John Stevenson, "a native of Londonderry, in the Kingdom of Ireland, and of a very respectable Family", was born c. 1718. He had "lived upwards of forty years" in Baltimore at his death in 1785 "and was formerly one of its most eminent Merchants." "He was the first Exporter of Wheat and Flour from this Port, and consequently laid the Foundation of its present commercial Consequence."

Stevenson began by shipping flour to Ireland which turned Baltimore from a sleepy city trading in tobacco to a trading powerhouse rivaling New York, Philadelphia and Boston. Baltimore being a port nestled alongside a vast wheat growing countryside and much closer than these other cities. Baltimore restructured the city's economy based on flour. Trails were transformed into roads, and flour mills were built along the Jones Falls, Gwynns Falls, and Patapsco River. Warehouses were built on the 1,000-foot-long (300 m) wharves that extended into the harbor. The roads from Baltimore soon extended all the way to Pennsylvania, and Baltimore ships sailed not only to Ireland, but to ports in Europe, the Caribbean, and South America.

Sometime in these early years Stevenson met his lifelong friend and business partner Jonathan Plowman Jr. Stevenson and Plowman Jr. remain known for their partnership trading in indentured servants, particularly during the 1750s and 1760s, according to the National Park Service. The fact that Plowman Jr.'s father was brought over as an indentured servant at age 12 may only testify to the goodwill of the two. Plowman Sr. most likely encouraged Stevenson to help bring the poor and oppressed out of England and to a new life and a new chance for success in America, much as he and his son had done.

== Medical doctor ==
There were smallpox epidemics in the county in 1750, 1757, in 1772, and another in 1779. Stevenson inoculated all who came to him without charge against the pox. Many were resistant to change and did not accept the inoculation. In fact in 1776 the Council of Safety in Baltimore, forbade the inoculation of the troops lest it cause an epidemic.

In 1769 Stevenson's brother, Henry Stevenson established the first smallpox hospital in the colonies there in Baltimore.

== Justice of the peace ==
Stevenson, and his best friend and business partner Jonathan Plowman Jr., were both named Justices of the Peace to help resolve legal issues in Baltimore. Both of their names are listed as witnesses on many wills found in the Maryland Archives.

== Delegate to Constitutional Convention ==
Stevenson was elected as a representative to the Maryland Constitutional Convention which framed Maryland's first state constitution. Elected August 1, 1776, he and the other delegates went to Annapolis for the Convention that started August 14, 1776 and lasted till November 11, 1776.

The eighth session of the Annapolis Conventions decided that the continuation of an ad hoc government by the convention was not a good mechanism for all the concerns of the province. A more permanent and structured government was needed. The new convention was elected to draw up Maryland's first state constitution. Replacing references to parliament and the king, with "of the people". The Constitutional Convention of 1776 drafted a constitution, and adjourned on November 11, never to meet again since the Conventions were replaced by the new state government.

== Death ==
Stevenson died at his home on Market Street, Baltimore on March 23, 1785, in his 67th year. He was buried in the Presbyterian churchyard. Stevenson had been a member from 1761 of the committee that organized the First Presbyterian Church in Baltimore, as had Jonathan Plowman.
