= John Ambler (burgess) =

Virginia politician (1735–1766)

Member of the Virginia House of Burgesses representing Jamestown
- In office 1766
- Preceded by: Edward Champion Travis
- Succeeded by: Edward Ambler
- In office Nov. 1759-1761
- Preceded by: Edward Champion Travis
- Succeeded by: Edward Champion Travis

Personal details
- Born: December 31, 1735 Jamestown, Colony of Virginia
- Died: May 27, 1766 (aged 30) Barbados
- Resting place: Jamestown Churchyard
- Relations: Richard Ambler (father), Edward Ambler, Jaquelin Ambler (brothers)
- Education: Trinity College; Inner Temple, Middle Temple
- Occupation: Lawyer, planter, politician

John Ambler (December 31, 1735 – May 27, 1766) was a Virginia lawyer and planter who represented Jamestown twice in the House of Burgesses before his early death from tuberculosis.

== Early life ==
The second eldest son born to the former Elizabeth Jaquelin and her immigrant and merchant husband Richard Ambler was born on New Year's Eve in 1735, eleven years after his merchant father married his heiress mother. Although his mother gave birth to eleven children, only three boys reached adulthood and survived their parents: this man, his elder brother and heir Edward Ambler (1733-1768), and Jaquelin Ambler (1742-1798). His maternal grandfather, Edward Jaquelin had acquired much land on the western end of Jamestown Island, and represented it in the House of Burgesses in the 1712-1714 session. Richard Ambler was a British merchant who traded primarily from his house in the port of Yorktown (where the York River enters the Hampton Roads area of Chesapeake Bay. He was also the tax collector for the York River area (northern Hampton Roads of Chesapeake Bay), as successively would be his sons. Like his elder brother Edward, John Ambler received an education appropriate to his class, primarily in England, although sources differ as to where he attended (Trinity College and Inner and Middle Temples or Leeds Academy and Cambridge University. Unlike Edward, John Ambler received a law degree as well as traveled extensively in Europe, reportedly mastered seven languages before re-crossing the Atlantic Ocean.

== Career ==
Upon returning to Virginia, Ambler took up residence in a mansion his father had erected in Jamestown, but at some point it caught fire and half of it was destroyed. Ambler also operated plantations using enslaved labor, and beginning in November 1762 leased acreage in Governor's Land across the isthmus from Jamestown, as had his grandfather Edward Jaquelin.

Jamestown voters elected Ambler as their (part-time) representative in the House of Burgesses, to replace Edward Champion Travis, who had resigned after accepting a position as coroner. During his term, the burgesses considered building a tobacco inspection warehouse on Ambler's property. He was also elected to another session of the House of Burgesses, but died before it met, and was succeeded by his elder brother Edward Ambler.

== Death and legacy ==
John Ambler never married and suffered from tuberculosis, as would his elder brother. He traveled to Barbados hoping to recover, but died there on May 27, 1766, having outlived his father by only three months. He named his older brother Edward as his executor and heir, and Jamestown voters also elected Edward to represent them in the House of Burgesses during this man's second elected term. His epitaph called him peerless in attending to family and social duties.
