= John Holloway (Virginia politician) =

Virginian politician (c. 1666–1734)

John Holloway Sr.

30th Speaker of the Virginia House of Burgesses
- In office 1720–1734
- Preceded by: Daniel McCarty
- Succeeded by: Sir John Randolph

Member of the Virginia House of Burgesses representing York County
- In office 1728–1734 Serving with Lawrence Smith
- Preceded by: Edward Tabb
- Succeeded by: Edward Diggs

Member of the Virginia House of Burgesses representing Williamsburg
- In office 1723–1726
- Preceded by: n/a
- Succeeded by: John Clayton

Member of the Virginia House of Burgesses representing York County
- In office 1720–1722 Serving with Lawrence Smith
- Preceded by: William Barber
- Succeeded by: Edward Tabb

1st Mayor of Williamsburg, Virginia
- In office 1722–1723

Member of the Virginia House of Burgesses representing King and Queen County
- In office 1710–1714 Serving with William Bird
- Preceded by: John Walker
- Succeeded by: Gawin Corbin

Personal details
- Born: c. 1666
- Died: December 14, 1734 Virginia
- Occupation: Attorney, politician

John Holloway (c.1666 – December 14, 1734) was a politician and lawyer in the British colony of Virginia. He served as Speaker of the House of Burgesses (1720–34), having represented at various times, King and Queen County, York County and Williamsburg. He also served as the first mayor of Williamsburg, Virginia (1722–23), and treasurer of the colony (1723–34).

== Early and family life ==
Born probably in London, and the grandson of George Holloway of Oxford, Holloway was educated and became a lawyer. He also served as a soldier in King William's army in Ireland, and invested in a business venture that failed.

Holloway emigrated to the Virginia colony from England around 1700. He married Elizabeth Cocke, widow of Dr. William Cocke, the Secretary of State, and sister of Mark Catesby. However, they had no children.

== Career ==
Holloway first settled in King and Queen County and its voters elected him as one of their representatives to the House of Burgesses in the 1710-1712 and 1712-1714 sessions.

Some time during the 1710s, Holloway and fellow attorneys John Clayton and William Robertson prepared a collection of Virginia statues in force, which Clayton later revised and William Parks published in 1733.

Midway during the decade, Holloway moved to the colony's capital at Williamsburg, part of which is in York County, and part in James City County. York County voters elected Holloway as one of their representatives in the House of Burgesses in 1720, and fellow burgesses elected him as their speaker, and kept re-electing him until his death. When the legislature incorporated Williamsburg as a town in its own right, Holloway became its first mayor, as well as its sole representative in the House of Burgesses (for a couple of terms, after which he resumed as one of York County's representatives).

Holloway also served as the colony's treasurer until his death, and was succeeded as both Speaker and as treasurer by John Randolph of Charles City County an attorney whom some considered as his political rival.
