= Battle of Hampton =

- Part of the Chesapeake campaign during the War of 1812
Date	25 June 1813
Location	Hampton, Virginia
Result	British victory

Belligerents
United Kingdom	United States

Commanders and leaders
Stapleton Crutchfeld	Unknown

Units involved
Royal Marines; Independent Companies of Foreigners	Virginia militia

Strength
2,000 regulars (Note: Including both Army regulars and Royal Marines)	450 militia

Casualties and losses
5 killed 33 wounded 10 missing	Unknown

The Battle of Hampton was a successful British attack against Hampton, Virginia, in the War of 1812, following their defeat at the Battle of Craney Island. 2,000 Army regulars and Royal Marines, under Stapleton Crutchfeld, defeated 450 Virginia militia and occupied Hampton for one day, capturing guns, ammunition, wagons, horses, livestock and other foodstuffs. The Independent Companies of Foreigners, a unit recruited from French prisoners of war, sacked Hampton. Crutchfeld's forces suffered 5 killed, 33 wounded and 10 missing.

== See also ==
- Timeline of the War of 1812
