= Jaquelin Ambler =

Virginia merchant & planter (1742–1798)

Treasurer of Virginia
- In office 1782-1798

Alderman of Richmond, Virginia
- In office 1792-1793

Member of the Virginia Council of State
- In office 1780-1782

Personal details
- Born: August 9, 1742 Yorktown, Colony of Virginia
- Died: January 10, 1798 (aged 55) Richmond, Virginia
- Resting place: St. John's Church, Richmond, Virginia
- Spouse: Rebecca Lewis Burwell
- Relations: John Ambler, Edward Ambler (brothers)
- Parent(s): Richard Ambler, Elizabeth Jaquelin
- Education: College of William & Mary, College of Philadelphia
- Occupation: Merchant, planter, politician

Military service
- Branch/service: Virginia militia
- Rank: Captain

Jaquelin Ambler (August 9, 1742 – January 10, 1798) was a Virginia merchant, planter and government official who during the American Revolutionary War served in the Virginia Governor's Council and later as the Treasurer of Virginia.

== Early life ==
The seventh of nine children and youngest surviving son born to the former Elizabeth Jaquelin (1709-1756) and her immigrant merchant husband Richard Ambler (1690-1755), ultimately inherited his father's business with his nephews and may have had the most distinguished political career in the family. His mother bore six sons and three daughters before her death, but only three sons survived their father. Both his elder brothers died, possibly of tuberculosis, in 1766 and 1768. His father had at about age 20 immigrated to the Virginia colony and established a mercantile business at Yorktown, Virginia. He married an heiress and became a justice of the peace of York County (1724-1737), vestryman of Yorkhampton Parish and customs collector of the York River district for 35 years until surrendering the position to his middle surviving son, John Ambler. Unlike his elder brothers, who were educated in England, Ambler was educated at the College of William and Mary in nearby Williamsburg, and then the College of Philadelphia, graduating in 1761.

== Career ==
After apprenticing with his father and brother Edward for two years, he became a partner in the family business. He lived in Yorktown, as well as operated a plantation using enslaved labor in nearby Warwick County. However, in 1766 both his father and brother John died within months of each other, and Edward also died of illness in 1768. Meanwhile, Jaquelin became the customs collector for the York River area, and held that post for a decade, as well as helped his brother Edward's widow raise his young nephews. He also served on the Yorkhampton Parish vestry, became a justice of the peace in York County in 1767, and served as the county sheriff (1771 to 1773).

During the American Revolutionary War, Ambler moved his family westward for safety, since Yorktown and Jamestown were strategically important. They initially moved to the frontier in Winchester but in 1777 moved partway back to Hanover County and in 1778 to a small house in Yorktown, where one of their neighbors was Capt. Thomas Marshall, whose son John Marshall fell in love with one of Ambler's daughters.

Ambler served on Virginia's Naval Board in the spring of 1779 (the last months of its existence), then on the Virginia Board of Trade. This important agency oversaw importation, domestic manufacture, and allocation of military supplies and necessities. However Ambler was financially devastated by the American Revolutionary War, the last campaigns of which were on his family's lands, including the Siege of Yorktown. As the British invaded twice, the state government moved to Richmond and the conflict neared conclusion in the spring 1780, he was appointed to the legislature's upper house, the Council of State. He served two years before fellow members appointed him the state treasurer, a position he held until his death. As director of public buildings, Ambler moved to Richmond and helped construct the Virginia State Capital in Richmond. He also bought several properties on Shockoe Hill.

== Personal life ==
On May 24, 1764, having reached legal age and control of his inheritance, Ambler married Rebecca Burwell, daughter of Councillor (and briefly acting Governor) Lewis Burwell. She had been orphaned at the age of ten and raised by Yorktown merchant William Nelson and his wife Elizabeth, alongside their own children. She is now known as "Belinda", an adolescent crush of Thomas Jefferson, who was a classmate of one of Nelson's sons at the College of William & Mary in nearby Williamsburg. Jaquelin and Rebecca altogether had one son and seven daughters, which may have contributed to Rebecca's poor health during her later years. However, only three daughters survived this man—neither their son nor daughters Martha nor Lucy reached adulthood and married. Their eldest daughter Betsy married twice and survived both husbands, but had no children, later becoming known for her piety and founding of the Female Humane Association of the City of Richmond. Mary (Polly) Ambler married John Marshall, and had many children, then like her mother suffered multiple illnesses in her final years. Other sisters including Ann (Nancy) married prominent attorney Daniel Call or George Fisher. John Marshall's sister married this man's nephew (his brother Edward's son) John Ambler, who inherited most of the family's wealth as well as continued the tradition of legislative service, served in the War of 1812, and lived near this man's Richmond residence.

Jaquelin Ambler was pious during his final years, and the rector of Henrico Parish, John Buchanan, lived in his Richmond household for several years.

== Death and legacy ==
Ambler suffered a painful kidney condition and died at his Richmond home on January 10, 1798. The General Assembly adjourned so members could attend his funeral and interment at historic St. John's Church in Richmond. His widow survived until 1806, and was buried beside him. His Jamestown home had burned slightly before the American Revolutionary War and during the Civil War, and had been rebuilt both times, but when it again burned in 1895, it was not rebuilt. His Richmond home, at 408 N. 10th Street (at Cary St), was the home of a later city treasurer, Samuel Crofton Greenhow, but fell into disrepair and was demolished in 1894, and the nearby home of his nephew John Ambler was destroyed before the Civil War. The entire block today is an office building for the Richmond Department of Social Services.
