= John Custis (burgess) =

American planter and politician

Coordinates: 37.229053°N 76.003698°W

John Custis III

Member of the Virginia Governor's Council
- In office 1700-1713

Member of the House of Burgesses for Northampton County
- In office 1693–1699 Serving with William Kendall, William Waters, Nathaniel Littleton
- Preceded by: Thomas Harmanson
- Succeeded by: William Waters
- In office 1684–1686 Serving with William Kendall, Isaac Foxcroft
- Preceded by: seat established
- Succeeded by: Thomas Harmanson

Personal details
- Born: 1654 Northampton County, Virginia Colony
- Died: January 26, 1714 (aged 59–60) Machipongo, Northampton County, Virginia colony
- Spouse(s): Margaret Michael, Sarah Littleton Michael
- Children: John Custis IV, six sons and two daughters
- Relatives: John Custis Sr.(II) (father), John Custis I (grandfather)
- Occupation: Planter, attorney, politician, soldier

John Custis III (1654 – January 26, 1714) was a Virginia-born planter and politician who served in both houses of the Virginia General Assembly in the British colony of Virginia, as well as in various local offices on the Eastern Shore of Virginia in Northampton County. He is sometimes designated John Custis III or "of Wilsonia" to distinguish him from his son (John Custis IV or "of Williamsburg"), as well as his father (and great-uncle), all of the same name, and who all also served in the Assembly's upper house, the Virginia Governor's Council.

== Early life ==
Coat of Arms of John Custis

Arms of George Washington Parke Custis

Custis was born in late 1653 or early 1654 in Northampton County, Virginia, to British merchant and eventual emigrant John Custis II and his first wife, Elizabeth Robinson Eyer, who died shortly after the birth. His father, in addition to farming, held various local offices and eventually won appointment to the Governor's Council and remarried twice more but without issue. John Custis III was raised mostly at the mansion his father built and called Arlington plantation, which he had purchased from Thomas Burdett, whose daughter Alicia had become his second wife (but died probably in 1680). When John III was a child, his father not only held several local offices, but during Bacon's Rebellion in 1676 he financially and militarily assisted Virginia's Governor William Berkeley. Upon fleeing Jamestown, Berkeley made Arlington his temporary residence, so it briefly became the colony's capital. The elder Custis was appointed to the Governor's Council the following year and basically remained on that body until his final years. John Custis II also would marry a third time, to the twice widowed Tabitha Scarborough Smart Brown, the daughter of the former Speaker Edmund Scarborough and whose daughter from a previous marriage married John Custis II's nephew before property disagreements arose between John II and Tabitha. The elder John Custis died and was buried at Arlington in 1696, and his widow married her fourth powerful husband, Edward Hill, who had been the colony's treasurer as well as Speaker of the House of Burgesses. Meanwhile, this young John Custis III received a private education appropriate to his class from tutors.

== Career ==
Custis was a planter who grew tobacco using enslaved labor. He mostly resided on his Wilsonia plantation, which is now Machipongo, Virginia. Custis often appears as an attorney in early Northampton County records, including successfully representing the rector in Teackle v. Parker late in the century. He also invested in real estate near the northern boundary of Virginia's Eastern shore and Chincoteague Island, often with fellow planter and politician William Kendall as partner. In 1705, a court found his slave Sarah guilty for burning a barn full of grain and several barrels of Her Majesty's gunpowder, and was hanged, although Custis was not ordered to compensate the government for the destroyed gunpowder.

This John Custis at various times would hold most of the public offices in Northampton County, which was created in 1663 when the Virginia General Assembly split Accomack County. His father John Custis II became the county's coroner in 1673, and two years later appointed his son as his deputy, to conduct the office in his absence. When his father received an appointment to the Governor's Council in 1677, his position as justice of the county court (which held administrative as well as judicial functions) went to John Custis III. Like his father, John Custis III also won election three times as the county sheriff (in 1682, 1684, and 1688), so his father was responsible for imprisoning some of Nathaniel Bacon's followers in 1676. In 1683 this John Custis summoned the churchwardens of Hunger's Parish to the General Court in Williamsburg on parishioners' behalf, for moving the church without the parish's consent, as well as continuing their terms without re-election. He would first serve on the parish's vestry in 1691.

Northampton County voters elected John Custis III as one of their two delegates in the House of Burgesses in 1684, and he served many terms in the lower house of the Virginia General Assembly until appointed to the Governor's Council in late 1699 (remaining in the upper house for the rest of his life, as was customary). Although Custis III was disqualified for his first legislative term because he simultaneously held the county office of sheriff, when the election was held again, he won again, so served alongside Isaac Foxcroft in the 1685-1686 session. He next won election in 1693, when he and William Kendall represented the county; voters replaced Kendall by William Waters in the year's second session, and both Custis and Waters won re-election until 1697, when Waters was elected sheriff. Meanwhile, Custis' political influence grew in the colony, as he came to chair the House of Burgess' Committee for Elections and Privileges, and also held a high-ranking seat on the Committee for Propositions and Grievances. Possibly his most important service was chairing the committee that recommended moving the colony's capitol to Middle Plantation, which became Williamsburg. During his final terms in the lower house, Custis represented Northampton County together with Nathaniel Littleton; in 1699, partly because of Custis' promotion to the Governor's Council, both were replaced by William Waters and John Powell.

Custis' royal appointment to the governor's Council was signed on December 26, 1699, the King accepting the recommendation of Governor Francis Nicholson. John Custis III began serving in the upper house of the Virginia General Assembly on July 19, 1700, and held that office until his death, although his last recorded appearance was on April 30, 1713. Meanwhile, his son John Custis IV began representing Northampton County in the House of Burgesses in 1705.

== Personal life ==
This John Custis married twice. His first wife, the former Margaret Michael, bore him nine children, of whom five reached adulthood, including sons John Custis IV (who married Francis Parke), Hancock Custis (who married the widow Mary Littleton and died in 1728) and Henry Custis (who married Tabitha Custis and then the widow Anne Kendall Custis and died in 1733) and daughters Elizabeth (who married cousin Thomas Custis and died circa 1717) and Sorrowful Margaret (the name reflecting that her mother died following the birth, though she herself married first William Kendall, and after his death Thomas Cable, before herself dying in 1750). In 1691, Custis married her brother's widow, but Sarah Littleton Michael bore no further children. John Custis IV as the eldest son by primogeniture received most of his father's significant estate.

== Death ==
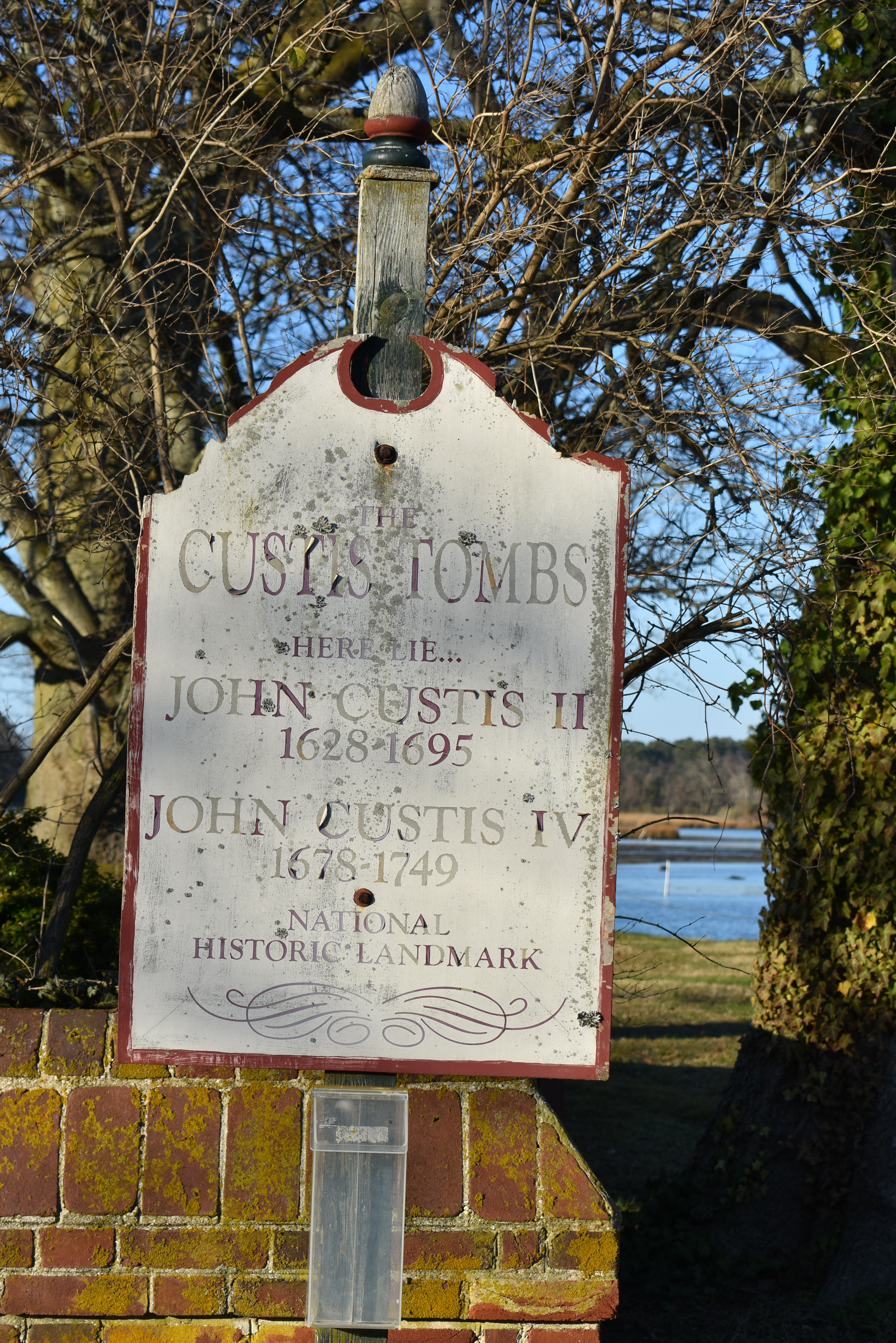
The Custis Tombs

John Custis III suffered ill health, including gout and arthritis, during his final years. He wrote his will in 1708, by which time he owned over 7,000 acres of land and 30 slaves. He died at his Wilsonia plantation on January 26, 1714, and was buried there. Arlington burned to the ground during his son's tenure, and while major signage indicates only John Custis II and John Custis IV are buried at the Arlington plantation's Custis Tombs, a smaller sign indicates Custis III was also reburied there.
