= James G. Spady =

American writer, historian, and journalist (1944–2020)

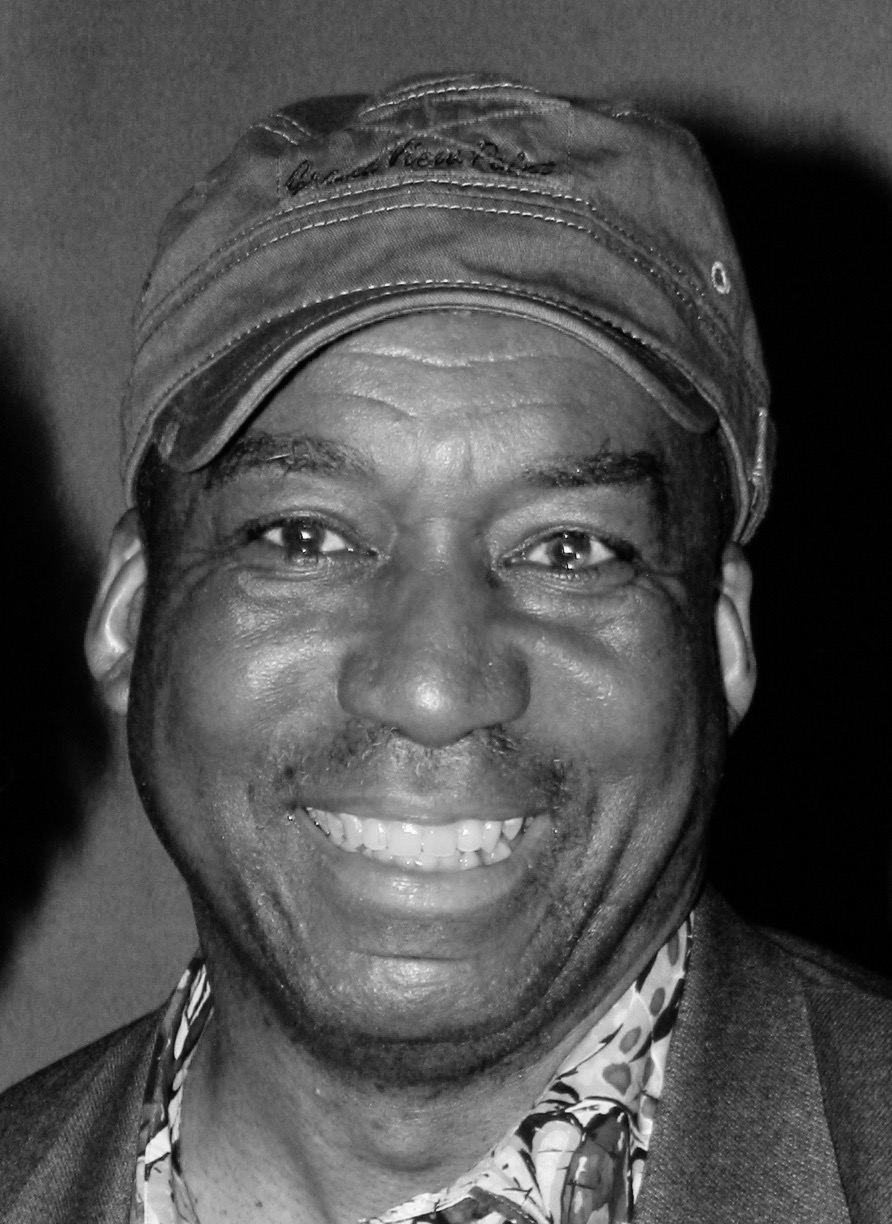
- Born: April 2, 1944; Capeville, Virginia, United States
- Died: February 17, 2020 (aged 75); Philadelphia, Pennsylvania, United States
- Occupations: Writer, historian, journalist
- Notable work: Marcus Garvey, Africa and the UNIA (1985); Nation Conscious Rap (1991); The Global Cipha: Hip Hop Culture & Consciousness (2006)
- Awards: American Book Award (1988); National Newspaper Publishers Association's Meritorious Award

James G. Spady (April 2, 1944 – February 17, 2020) was an American Book Award-winning writer, historian, and journalist. Over his fifty-year career, Spady authored and edited numerous books, worked in radio, television, and film, wrote hundreds of newspaper articles for various print media, and received the National Newspaper Publishers Association's Meritorious Award.

== Early life and career ==
James G. Spady was born in Capeville, Virginia. As a young man, he joined the Philadelphia NAACP Youth Council, where he met civil rights leader, attorney, and Philadelphia NAACP President, Cecil B. Moore. Under Moore's leadership, Spady joined the historic 1965 protests to desegregate Girard College, a whites-only K-12 school for poor, orphaned boys. That successful effort entailed seven months of picketing in front of the school's imposing exterior wall which—upon his visit to the protests—Dr. Martin Luther King Jr. called "a kind of Berlin Wall to keep the colored children of God out." Later, Spady would continue his activism by helping organize Muhammad Ali's 1967 visit to Howard University where Ali gave his "Black is Best" speech.

Spady's scholarly work began shortly thereafter, following extensive travels across the African continent and western Europe. Most notably, in May 1968, he and colleagues founded the Black History Museum Library at the Heritage House in North Philadelphia (later relocating to the YWCA on Girard Avenue and the adjoining historic African-American social club, The Pyramid Club). The library housed—according to contemporary accounts—"three thousand volumes, pamphlets, brochures, slave tracts, papers, correspondences, paintings, musical instruments, recordings, unpublished manuscripts, news clippings, and other materials." The library published the Black History Museum UMUM Newsletter beginning in October 1971, which focused on African and African diasporic contributions to history, science, music, and literature, and featured original contributions from writers and scholars across the United States and beyond. The formal museum/library space was forced to close by 1973 after a fire and subsequent theft, but continued to release its newsletter and publish books for many years thereafter under various iterations of the Black History Museum UMUM imprint. Importantly, the Black History Museum Library preceded—and helped lay the foundation for—the Afro-American Historical and Cultural Museum (now known as the African American Museum in Philadelphia), whose first director, Charles H. Wesley, was a mentor to Spady and a supporter of this earlier effort.

== Scholarly work ==
In his work as a historian and journalist, James G. Spady interviewed, wrote about, and in some cases befriended a wide range of the most significant scholars, musicians, and writers of the twentieth century, including: Nina Simone, James Brown, Fela Kuti, Stevie Wonder, Bob Marley, Miles Davis, and Dizzy Gillespie; James Baldwin, Gwendolyn Brooks, Ntozake Shange, and Sterling Brown; Cheikh Anta Diop, Mercer Cook, Merze Tate, Adelaide Cromwell, Charles H. Wesley, and Benjamin Quarles.

But Spady also committed a great deal of his life to documenting and honoring the life and work of trailblazing but oft-overlooked cultural figures, intellectuals, and political activists. He led an effort to document the life and work of pioneering African-American architect Julian Abele. He published a booklet, Julian Abele and the Architecture of Bon Vivant (1982), and ultimately convinced the Philadelphia Museum of Art and University of Pennsylvania to officially recognize Abele's role in designing the museum as well as several Penn campus buildings. Spady also was instrumental in bringing renewed attention to the pioneering work of poet, folklorist, and professor, Sterling A. Brown, by organizing a major public tribute to him at Washington, DC's Martin Luther King Jr. Memorial Library in 1976 and enlisting poet Robert Hayden to serve as Chairman for the day's program. That program featured tributes from Ruby Dee and Ossie Davis, A.B. Spellman, Dr. Montague Cobb, Dr. Allison Davis, and Milford Graves, as well as Loïs Mailou Jones who drew charcoal portraits of Sterling Brown live during the event. Spady and the Black History Museum UMUM Committee subsequently edited and published, Sterling A. Brown: A UMUM Tribute (1976 and 1982), which featured contributions by Amiri Baraka, Alan Lomax, Ophelia Egypt, Houston Baker, Léon Damas, Arthur Huff Fauset, and Léopold Sédar Senhgor. In 1979, the Washington, D.C. City Council declared Brown's birthday, May 1, Sterling A. Brown Day, and he was named the city's poet laureate in 1984. Brown remarked in an interview with The Washington Post: "I've been rediscovered, reinstituted, regenerated and recovered."

Spady carried out this kind of work for a number of other significant figures, including African-American composer William L. Dawson. He and the Black History Museum Committee published the book, William L. Dawson: A UMUM Tribute and a Marvelous Journey, in 1981. After interviewing and befriending Senegalese intellectual Cheikh Anta Diop in the late 1960s, Spady wrote one of the first English-language scholarly articles to examine his work ("Negritude, PanBanegritude, and the Diopian Philosophy of African History"] in 1972). When Third World Press published an English translation of Diop's book, The Cultural Unity of Black Africa (1978), it included an afterword by James G. Spady at the request of Diop himself. Spady later commissioned and published a trilingual epic poem by poet and professor Mwatabu Okantah entitled Cheikh Anta Diop: Poem For The Living (1997); this was the first trilingual epic poem ever to be published in English, French, and Wolof.

As a longtime Philadelphia resident, that city's history and contributions were often the subject of Spady's work. He wrote a biography of his late friend, fellow Philadelphian, and Black Arts Movement visionary, Larry Neal, entitled Larry Neal: Liberated Black Philly Poet with a Blues Streak of Mellow Wisdom (1989). In addition, Spady fought for the commemoration of the life and work of his mentor, attorney, and civil rights leader, Cecil B. Moore, about whom he published a small booklet, Cecil B. Moore: A Soldier for Justice (1985). Shortly before Spady's death, he wrote the text that formed the basis for SEPTA's recently installed historical exhibit at the Cecil B. Moore Subway Station on Philadelphia's Broad Street Line. Spady was also asked by famed Philadelphia radio DJ and civil rights figure Georgie Woods to write his biography, which became the book, Georgie Woods – 'I'm Only A Man!': The Life Story of a Mass Communicator, Promoter, Civil Rights Activist (1992).

Spady was a longtime board member of the Marcus Garvey Memorial Foundation, an educational organization co-founded in 1961 by his mentor, Thomas W. Harvey, who had served as a successor to Marcus Garvey as President-General of the Universal Negro Improvement Association (UNIA). In 1985, Spady published Marcus Garvey, Africa, and the Universal Negro Improvement Association. In 2011, he authored Marcus Garvey, Jazz, Reggae, Hip Hop, and the African Diaspora and co-edited New Perspectives on the History of Marcus Garvey, the UNIA, and the African Diaspora

Spady dedicated much of the last 35 years of his life to documenting Hip Hop history and culture. He co-authored the first trilogy of books about Hip Hop, with Nation Conscious Rap (1991), Twisted Tales: In the Hip Hop Streets of Philly (1995), and Street Conscious Rap (1999), ultimately adding a fourth volume with The Global Cipha: Hip Hop Culture and Consciousness (2006).

== Awards ==
Awards Spady received include the American Book Award in 1988 and the National Newspaper Publishers Association's Meritorious Award.

== Archives ==
Following Spady's death in 2020, at the age of 75, his family together with a group of University of Pennsylvania alumni whom he had mentored worked to build an archive of his writings, which was eventually acquired in 2023 by the University of Pennsylvania Libraries.

== Selected works ==
=== Books ===
- Black Poets Write On!: An Anthology of Black Philadelphian Poets (1970)
- Sterling A. Brown: A UMUM Tribute (1976 and 1982)
- Indigené: An Anthology of Future Black Arts (1978)
- William L. Dawson: A UMUM Tribute and a Marvelous Journey (1981)
- 9 to the Universe: Black Artists (1983)
- Marcus Garvey, Africa, and the Universal Negro Improvement Association (1985)
- Larry Neal: Liberated Black Philly Poet with a Blues Streak of Mellow Wisdom (1989)
- Nation Conscious Rap (1991)
- Georgie Woods – 'I'm Only A Man!': The Life Story of a Mass Communicator, Promoter, Civil Rights Activist (1992)
- Twisted Tales: In the Hip Hop Streets of Philly (1995)
- Street Conscious Rap (1999)
- 360 Degreez of Sonia Sanchez: Hip Hop, Narrativity, Iqhawe and Public Spaces of Being (2000)
- The Global Cipha: Hip Hop Culture and Consciousness (2006)
- Marcus Garvey, Jazz, Reggae, Hip Hop, and the African Diaspora (2011)
- New Perspectives on the History of Marcus Garvey, the UNIA, and the African Diaspora (2011)

=== Journal articles ===
- "Dr. William Leo Hansberry: The Legacy of an African Hunter," Current Bibliography on African Affairs, Vol. 3, No. 11-12 (1970), 25–40.
- "The Ancient Zimbabwe Empire", Negro History Bulletin, (1971), 33–34.
- "The Cultural Unity of Cheikh Anta Diop, 1948–1964", Black Images: A Critical Quarterly on Black Arts and Culture, I, III–IV (1972), pp. 14–22.
- "Negritude, PanBanegritude, and the Diopian Philosophy of African History", A Current Bibliography on African Affairs, Vol. 5, No. 1 (1972), pp. 11–29.
- "Memorial Services for Arna Bontemps", CLA Journal, Vol. 17, No. 1 (September 1973), pp. 117–119.
- "The Afro-American Historical Society: The Nucleus of Black Bibliophilies, 1897–1913", Negro History Bulletin, Vol. 37, No. 4 (June/July 1974), pp. 254–257.
- "Major Richard R. Wright: Scholar and Activist", Umoja: Southwestern Black Journal (1975), pp. 11–17.
- "Sterling A. Brown Honored at UMUM Fete in Washington, D.C.", The Black Scholar, Vol. 8, No. 5 (1977), pp. 40–44.
- "Tri-Muse: The Historiography of Joel A. Rogers, Drusilla Dunjee Houston and William Leo Hansberry", in Y'Bird, Vol. I, No. 2 (1978), pp. 98–116.
- "Indigene = Folkski Equations in the Black Arts", The Black Scholar, Vol. 10, No. 3/4 (November/December 1978), pp. 24–33.
- Dr. Nnamdi Azikiwe: Portrait of a Pan African Giant", Black Collegian, December 1980/January 1981.
- "Surrealism and the Marvelous Black Plunge in Search of Yemanga and the Human Condition", Cultural Correspondence, 12–14 (Summer 1981), pp. 92–95.
- "Dr. W. Montague Cobb: Anatomist, Physician, Physical Anthropologist, Editor Emeritus of The Journal of the National Medical Association, and First Black President of NAACP", Journal of the National Medical Association, Vol. 76, No. 7 (1984), 739–744.
- "The Changing Perception of Cheikh Anta Diop and His Work", Journal of African Civilizations, Vol. 8, No. 1 (June 1986), pp. 89–101.
- "Dr. Cheikh Anta Diop and The Background of Scholarship on Black Interest in Egyptology and Nile Valley Civilizations", Présence Africaine, No. 149/150, HOMMAGE à Cheikh Anta Diop (1er et 2e TRIMESTRES 1989), pp. 292–312.
- "'IMA PUT MY THING DOWN': Afro-American Expressive Culture and the Hip Hop Community", TYANABA: Revue de la Société d'Anthropologie, Vol. 20, No. 2 (1993), 93–98.
- "Moving in Silence: Motion, Movement and Music in a Hip Hop Centered Cultural Universe", Black Arts Quarterly, Vol. 6, No. 3 (2002).
- "Jean Harvey Slappy's Philosophy and the Tradition of Marcus Garvey and Thomas W. Harvey" (with Giles R. Wright), American Philosophical Association's Newsletter on Philosophy and the Black Experience, Vol. 2, No. 2 (Spring 2003), pp. 57–60.
- "Dreams, Memories and X-Ray Stars in 2003: The Distinctive Role of DMX in the Poetics of African American Identity" (book review of: Smokey D. Fontaine and Earl Simmons, E.A.R.L.: The Autobiography of DMX), American Philosophical Association's Newsletter on Philosophy and the Black Experience, Vol. 2, No. 2 (Spring 2003), pp. 89–90.
- "The Hip Hop Nation as a Site of African-American Cultural and Historical Memory", Drumvoices Revue, Vol. 12, No. 1 & 2 (2004), pp. 154–168.
- "The Fluoroscope of Brooklyn Hip Hop: Talib Kweli in Conversation", Callaloo, Vol. 29, No. 3 (Summer 2006), pp. 993–1011.
- "Mapping and Re-Membering Hip Hop History, Hiphopography and African Diasporic History", in Western Journal of Black Studies, Vol. 37, No. 2 (Summer 2013), pp. 126–157.

=== Book chapters ===
- "Dr. J.: The Interstellar Connector", in Free Spirits: Annals of the Insurgent Imagination, eds Paul Buhle, Jayne Cortez, Philip Lamantia, Nancy Joyce Peters, Franklin Rosemont, Penelope Rosemont (San Francisco: City Lights Books, 1982).
- "Blackspace", in Blacks in Science: Ancient and Modern, ed. Ivan Van Sertima (New Brunswick, NJ: Transaction Books, 1983), pp. 258–265.
- "Drusilla Dunjee Houston: A Umum Commentary, A Search, and Personal Notes", in Wonderful Ethiopians of the Ancient Cushite Empire, by Drusilla Dunjee Houston (Baltimore: Black Classic Press, 1985).
- "Gwendolyn Brooks and the Principle of Generosity: A Night in North Philly", in Say That The River Turns: The Impact of Gwendolyn Brooks, ed. Haki Madhubuti (Chicago, IL: Third World Press, 1987), pp. 70–71.
- "Marcus Mosiah Garvey: Man of Nobility and Mass Action", in Great Black Leaders: Ancient and Modern, ed. Ivan Van Sertima (Edison, NJ: Transaction Books, 1988).
- "Elmer Samuel Imes: Pioneer Black Physicist", in Blacks in Science: Ancient and Modern, ed. Ivan Van Sertima (New Brunswick, NJ: Transaction Books, 1991).
- "The Changing Perception of C.A. Diop and his Work: The Preeminence of a Scientific Spirit", in Great African Thinkers, Vol. 1: Cheikh Anta Diop, ed. Ivan Van Sertima (1992).

=== Encyclopedia entries ===
- "Robert Mara Adger", in Dictionary of American Negro Biography, eds Rayford W. Logan & Michael R. Winston (New York: W.W. Norton & Company, 1982), pp. 6–7.
- "William Carl Bolivar", in Dictionary of American Negro Biography, eds Rayford W. Logan & Michael R. Winston (New York: W.W. Norton & Company, 1982), p. 50.
- "Leon Gardiner", in Dictionary of American Negro Biography, eds Rayford W. Logan & Michael R. Winston (New York: W.W. Norton & Company, 1982), pp. 251–252.
- "Richard Robert Wright, Sr.", in Dictionary of American Negro Biography, eds Rayford W. Logan & Michael R. Winston (New York: W.W. Norton & Company, 1982), pp. 674–675.
