= Lucy Chester Parke =

- Born: 1710; St. John's, Antigua, British Leeward Islands
- Died: 1770 (aged 60–61); Antigua, British Leeward Islands
- Other names: Lucy Chester, Lucy Dunbar Parke
- Occupation: plantation owner
- Years active: 1723–1770

Lucy Chester Parke (January 1709 – November 1770) was a British colonial subject of Antigua who inherited the Gambles Plantation from her father. She gained note as an infant because of her illegitimacy, but was bequeathed an estate in Antigua, which she operated until her death. She spent over thirty years litigating his bequest with the American side of her father's family.

== Early life ==
Lucy Chester was most likely born in January 1709, in St. John's on Antigua, as her father's will written on 29 January 1709, specified that she was an unchristened infant. She was the illegitimate daughter of Katharine (also known as Catharine) Chester, wife of Edward Chester, an influential businessman, who was the factor of the Royal African Company and a member of the Assembly of Antigua and her lover, Daniel Parke, governor of the British Leeward Islands. Katharine and Parke had been discovered, when Edward walked in on one of their lovemaking sessions. He attempted to sever ties with his wife and threw her out of the house, but was threatened at sword point by Parke. Forced to take his adulterous wife back and support her, Edward was further cuckolded, when Parke's will not only made Katharine's child his heir, but insisted that she bear the given name of his mother and take his surname to inherit. When Parke was murdered on 7 December 1710, the details of his will brought attention on the child.

One of those who took note of Lucy Chester was Charles Dunbar, surveyor-general of the Leeward Islands royal customs service. Dunbar was an unsavory character, who manipulated others for his own financial gain. He came up with a scheme to marry his nephew, Thomas Dunbar, to Chester in the hopes that he could access her fortune. Chester's mother Katharine died in 1715, when Chester was around six years old and the child took the surname of Parke before her marriage. Within five years, Lucy Chester Parke married Thomas Dunbar on 10 December 1720, who changed his surname to Dunbar Parke.

== Inheritance and dispute ==
Parke's will was proven on 15 May 1711, leaving all of his properties in the four Leeward islands to Lucy Chester, should she survive to her majority and take his surname, using his coat of arms. He bequeathed to his legitimate daughters, Frances Custis and Lucy Byrd all of his estates in Virginia and England, which were to pass to their children, provided that they also continue to use his surname. If Chester did not survive, or refused to take his name, her share of Parke's estate would pass to her mother. Under the terms of the will, Frances Parke was the primary beneficiary and was ordered to pay the substantial debts Parke had acquired during his lifetime. Frances Parke had married John Custis, and to meet the terms of the will, the couple sought legislative action in 1712 to break the entail, so that they could sell part of the estate to pay her father's debts. Frances Parke died of smallpox on 14 March 1715, leaving as her heirs, Frances Parke Custis and Daniel Parke Custis, first husband of Martha Washington.

Lucy Parke married William Byrd II, who agreed to take on the debts of Parke's estate in exchange for the land and slaves left to Frances Parke. Lucy Parke Byrd died from smallpox on 18 December 1716, leaving as her only heir, Wilhelmina Byrd, who married Thomas Chamberlayne. Lucy Chester Dunbar Parke obtained possession of the Leeward Island properties and Gambles Plantation in 1723. Upon taking possession, Dunbar Parke applied to John Custis to pay the debts in the Leeward Islands out of the Virginia and England estates. Custis refused and the Dunbar Parkes filed a bill in the Virginia Court of Chancery. Custis again refused to pay insisting that the only two legitimate children of Parke were his deceased wife and deceased sister-in-law and that the intent of Daniel Parke was surely that the legitimate heirs pay only the debts in Virginia and England. Thomas Dunbar Parke died in 1734 and thereafter, the case was pursued by his executors, which included Charles Dunbar.

Suits and countersuits were followed by appeals and counter appeals, which were lodged for almost three decades. In 1754, the Chancery Court dismissed the Dunbar Parke claim and the decision was appealed to the Privy Council. In 1757, the Privy Council reversed the Virginia decision, causing Martha Custis' attorneys to advise her to appoint a legal guardian to represent her children in the lawsuit to protect their interests. As she had become a common-law guardian upon the death of Daniel Parke Custis, her attorneys recommended that she needed a formal guardian. George Washington, whom Custis married in 1759, did not take over as the children's guardian on behalf of his wife until after the settlement of the case concluded in 1761.

== Death and legacy ==
Parke died in Antigua, and was buried on 20 November 1770, leaving three children, Daniel, Lucy and Elizabeth Dunbar Parke.
