= Hancock Custis =

18th-century Virginian politician

Member of the Virginia House of Burgesses representing Accomack County, Virginia
- In office 1710–1712 Serving with Richard Drummond
- Preceded by: John Wise
- Succeeded by: Tully Robinson

Personal details
- Born: Accomack County, Virginia
- Died: 1728 Accomack County, Virginia
- Spouse: Mary
- Children: Sons John Custis VV, Southey, Levin, and Theophilus; Daughter Leah
- Parent(s): John Custis III, Margaret Michael
- Relatives: John Custis IV, Henry Custis (brothers)
- Occupation: Planter, Politician

Hancock Custis (died 1728) was a planter who served in the Virginia House of Burgesses, the elected lower house of the colonial Virginia General Assembly from Accomack County, Virginia in 1710–1712.

== Early life and family ==
Coat of Arms of John Custis

Arms of George Washington Parke Custis

Hancock Custis was the middle of the three surviving sons born to the former Margaret Michael and her husband, Colonel John Custis III. His elder brother John Custis IV married Francis Parke, and moved to Williamsburg, having served in the House of Burgesses and the Virginia Governor's Council. His younger brother Henry Custis The family also included sister Elizabeth (who married cousin Thomas Custis and died circa 1717) and Sorrowful Margaret (the name reflecting that her mother died following the birth, though she herself died in 1750).

Hancock Custis's brother, Major John Custis IV, became the father of Daniel Parke Custis, first husband of Martha Washington. Major John Custis named one of his sons "Hancock."

== Personal life ==
Hancock Custis married the widow Mary Littleton's will, which was proved May 7, 1728, mentions his wife Mary. Hancock and Mary Custis's children were sons John, Southey, Levin and Theophilus and daughter Leah, who married Levin Gale.

== Career ==
=== Planter ===
Hancock Custis inherited a farm at King's Creek from his uncle, Adam Michael.

=== Legislator ===
Hancock Custis' public career, like those of his father and eldest brother, included legislative service. Accomac County voters elected Hancock Custis as one of their representatives in the Virginia House of Burgesses in 1710, but he did not win another term.

== Death ==
Hancock Custis died between the date of his signing the last codicil to his will, August 17, 1727, its admission to probate on May 7, 1728.
