= Governor Douglas =

Governor Douglas may refer to:

- Francis Douglas, 1st Baron Douglas of Barloch (1889–1980), Governor of Malta from 1946 to 1949
- Howard Douglas (1776–1861), 3rd Lieutenant-Governor of New Brunswick from 1824 to 1831
- Jim Douglas (born 1951), 80th Governor of Vermont
- John Douglas (governor) (1835–1885), Governor of British Ceylon in 1883
- Walter Douglas (governor) (1670–1739), Governor-General of the Leeward Islands from 1711 to 1716
- William Lewis Douglas (1845–1924), 42nd Governor of Massachusetts
