= John Custis Sr. =

Colonial merchant, planter and politician

John Custis

Member of the Virginia Governor's Council
- In office 1680–1692

Member of the House of Burgesses for Northampton County
- In office 1677–1677 Serving with Isaac Foxcroft
- Preceded by: William Kendall (burgess)
- Succeeded by: John Custis (burgess)

Personal details
- Born: 1629 Rotterdam, Holland
- Died: 29 January 1696 (aged 66–67) Northampton County, Virginia colony
- Parent(s): Henry Custis, Johanna Wittington
- Relatives: John Custis I (uncle), William Custis (brother), John Custis III (son), John Custis IV and Hancock Custis (grandsons)
- Occupation: Planter, merchant, soldier, politician

John Custis II (Sr.) (1629 – January 29, 1696) was a Colonial merchant and planter who aligned with governor William Berkeley during Bacon's Rebellion and began a political career in which he served in both houses of the Virginia General Assembly and became one of the founders of the Custis family, one of the First Families of Virginia.

== Early and family life ==
Coat of Arms of John Custis

Arms of George Washington Parke Custis

The son of the former Johanna Wittingham and her Gloucestershire-born husband, Henry Custis, may have been born in Rotterdam in the Netherlands. His Royalist-leaning father Henry Custis fled there from England with his family during the English Civil War. Henry Custis owned a popular tavern in Rotterdam catering to fellow emigrants, and would trade with various merchants. His paternal grandparents, Edmund Clift Custis and Bridgett Smithier, had many children, including a son named John Custis (this man's uncle, who had also emigrated to the Virginia colony, but his older age according to the custom of the day may account for this man's now-confusingly being referred to John Custis II).

== Emigrant, planter and politician ==
This John Custis emigrated to the Virginia Colony, probably from Rotterdam in 1649 or 1650. By that date, his sister Ann had become the second wife of the widower Argall Yeardley, the son of George Yeardley (who became governor of the Virginia colony and died there in 1627). Ann's husband was not only a prominent planter on Virginia's Eastern Shore but had already served nearly a decade on the Virginia Governor's Council. Ann Custis probably sailed across the Atlantic Ocean with John Custis and their kinsman Henry Norwood, who left in a sloop from Argoll Yeardley's house for Jamestown.

After emigrating to the Virginia colony, Custis became a merchant and landowner. In 1650, Argall Yeardley issued him a certificate for 600 acres of land. In the 1650s, Custis also began holding important local offices, including as surveyor and appraiser of estates. This John Custis and his younger brother William were naturalized British citizens on the same day in November 1658, by a special act of the Virginia General Assembly, possibly because John had been denied appointment as the local sheriff because of his foreign birth. He became the county sheriff in 1659 and again in 1665 and 1666. Custis also was appointed captain of the county militia in 1664, its colonel in 1673, and retired in 1692 as commander of all militia on the Eastern Shore.

As the Virginia agent for various trading firms (and fluent in Dutch as well as English), Custis assembled cargo loads of Virginia tobacco which were shipped to the Dutch colony of New Amsterdam (then governed by Peter Stuyvesant, but which later became New York) as well as to New England and Rotterdam. Further complicating matters, England fought the Anglo-Dutch Wars in this era, and the booming tobacco prices in the 1650s fell drastically after the passage of the Navigation Acts in 1660, which required tobacco be shipped only to British merchants. Nonetheless, Custis owned more than a thousand acres of Virginia land by 1664, and during the next quarter century acquired an additional 10,000 acres, and his workforce of servants and slaves became one of the largest on the Eastern Shore. Both brothers had settled on what was initially the only shire on Virginia's Eastern Shore, then called Accomac County after a native American settlement. When it was divided (a contentious process for the division in 1670 was reversed then reinstated in 1674), John Custis' land was in what became the new Northampton County and William's land was in Accomac County. Custis may have become one of the justices of the peace for Accomac County as early as 1660; he clearly became one of the justices of the peace for Northampton County in 1674, alongside Thomas Rydings, Daniel Jenifer and Thomas Brown, who joined veterans Southy Littleton, Charles Scarburgh, Edmund Bowman and John Wise who had become justices of the peace in that county's 1670 creation. Complicating matters, in 1674, King Charles had granted the right to collect quitrents from all of Virginia except the Northern Neck of Virginia to favorites Henry Bennett (Earl of Arlington) and Thomas Culpeper, so the Virginia General Assembly later that year petitioned the King asking him to reverse the grant, which seemed the equivalent of additional taxes upon already financially strapped colonists, but received an equivocal answer.

After fleeing Jamestown in late July 1676, during Bacon's Rebellion, Governor Berkeley took refuge at Arlington plantation, the grand house this John Custis had erected earlier that decade in what had become Northampton County, possibly because sandbars on Old Plantation Creek forced larger ships to anchor well out to sea and made landing enemy troops difficult (and thus made it defensible). In any event, when Capt. William Carver came ashore to negotiate and dine with Berkeley on September 1, he was forced to use a small boat, and during the meeting Berkeley received word that the former captain of Carver's flagship believed his crew could recapture the vessel with some help, so Berkeley managed to send a boat of his loyalists to retake the vessel the next morning. Thus, the vessel was retaken with its crew, and Carver, Giles Bland (a former customs officer), and two other men soon executed for treason, and Berkeley and his loyalists soon sailed to (and retook) Jamestown.

Records have been lost as to whether Northampton County voters had first elected John Custis as one of the burgesses representing them in the spring of 1676 (in the General Assembly session that granted some of Bacon's demands), but he was clearly a major general in Berkeley's army which opposed the rebellion. The royal commissioners who investigated the conflict specifically praised Custis' loyalty to the governor, as well as his generous offer to lend the Crown a thousand pounds sterling to provision the king's ships. Commissioner (and former Speaker of the House of Burgesses) Francis Moryson once addressed Custis as "honest Jack", although some of his neighbors alluded to his imperious manner with the nickname "King Custis". After the rebellion was crushed, Northampton County's voters clearly elected John Custis as one of their two representatives in the House of Burgesses (along with Isaac Foxcroft), and he attended the 1677 assembly session at Green Spring. Furthermore, his younger brother, merchant William Custis came to represent Accomac County (alongside Southey Littleton, whose legislative service had clearly begun the previous year). Some time before July 5, 1677, after governor Berkeley had sailed to England and died, Lieutenant governor (and commissioner) Herbert Jeffrys appointed Custis to the Virginia Governor's Council, and he continued to sit as an additional member of the Accomack and Northampton County Courts. However, somehow his name was omitted from the list of Council members when Francis Howard was appointed governor in October 1683, so Custis petitioned the Crown for reinstatement in 1685.

== Personal life ==
Custis married three times, and each marriage brought additional land. His first wife, the widow Elizabeth Robinson Eyer, bore one son, John Custis III, before her death two or three years later. Custis married the thrice-widowed Alicia Travellor Burdett Walker in 1656. They lived at her father's house, which Custis had purchased from Thomas Burdett while patenting land next to it. During the 1670s, Custis built a 3-storey brick house that he named "Arlington" on Old Plantation Creek in Northampton County, which one historian presumes was named after the Custis family home in Gloucestershire. It was possibly the finest mansion erected in the Chesapeake Bay area during the 17th century (rivaled only by Governor Berkeley's Green Spring plantation near the colonial capital at Jamestown). However, Alicia died by 1680, when John Custis married the twice widowed Tabitha Scarburgh Smart Brown, who had inherited land from her father Edmund Scarburgh (one of the Eastern Shore's leading planters and former speaker of the House of Burgesses). Tabitha already had borne a daughter who married Custis' nephew. However, the marriage grew rocky over Custis' management of Tabitha's property (and her daughter's prospective inheritance).

== Death and legacy ==
John Custis prepared his last will in testament in 1691, and on April 15, 1692 resigned from the Virginia Governor's Council, citing extreme violent sicknesses and fits, as well as failing memory and hearing. Although thereafter relieved of civic responsibilities, Custis did not actually die until January 29, 1696, presumably at his Arlington mansion, and was buried near the manor house. By this time his son had already begun his Virginia political career, and would in 1700 begin more than a decade's service on the Virginia governor's council, and one of his two grandsons to become burgesses would also serve more than two decades. Archeological excavations have been performed at the former Arlington mansion site, and descendant George Washington Parke Custis who moved into what in John Custis' day was the Northern Neck Proprietary named a mansion there Arlington after this mansion.
