= Custis Tombs =

Historic cemetery in Virginia, United States

- U.S. National Register of Historic Places
- Virginia Landmarks Register
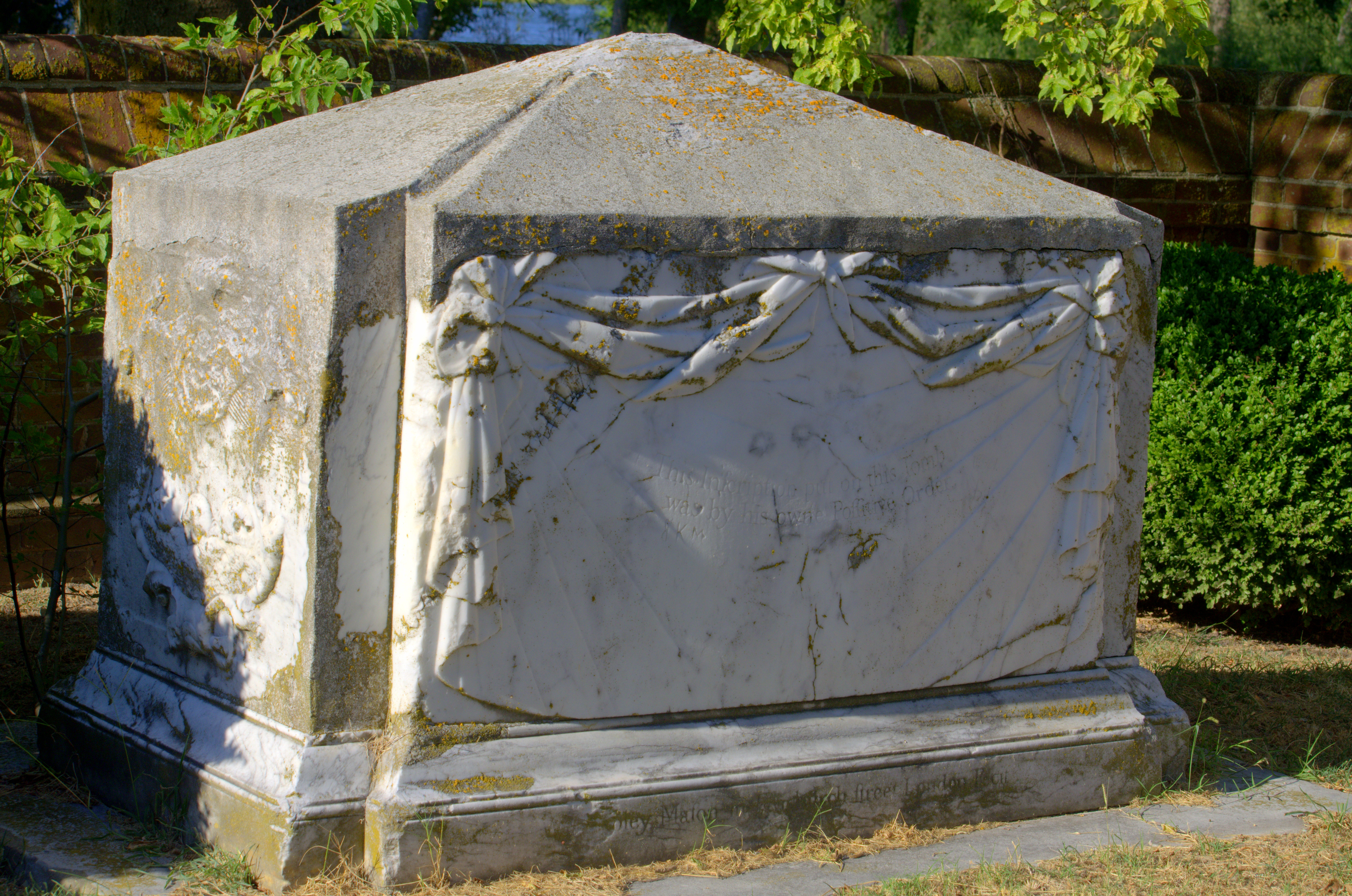
- John Custis IV tomb in 2016

- Location within Virginia Location within the United States
- Location: Northwest of the junction of Rtes. 644 and 645, near Cheapside, Virginia
- Coordinates: 37°13′44″N 76°0′14″W
- Area: less than one acre
- Built: c. 1650
- NRHP reference No.: 70000815
- VLR No.: 065-0066

Significant dates
- Added to NRHP: April 17, 1970
- Designated VLR: November 5, 1968

Custis Tombs, also known as Custis cemetery at Arlington, is a historic family burial ground located near Cheapside, Virginia, United States. It consists of two tombs surrounded by a poured concrete platform raised a few inches above ground level. It includes the grave of John Custis Sr. (c. 1629–1696), Major General and member of the Council for Virginia and progenitor of the Custis family in America. The other tomb is the box-like marble tomb of John Custis IV (1678–1749) with its pyramidal top and drapery carvings on the long sides. The tombs were associated with Arlington mansion and located west of the separately listed Arlington Archeological Site.

The site was listed on the National Register of Historic Places in 1970.
