= William Custis =

North American Colonial English merchant, planter and politician

Member of the House of Burgesses for Accomack County
- In office 1677–1677 Serving with Southey Littleton
- Preceded by: Hugh Yeo
- Succeeded by: Charles Scarburgh

Personal details
- Born: 1633 Netherlands
- Died: 1698 (aged 64–65) Accomack County, Virginia colony
- Parent: Henry Custis
- Relatives: John Custis II (brother)
- Occupation: Planter, politician

William Custis (1633 – 1698) was a North American Colonial English merchant, planter and politician. He was one of the founders of the Custis Family of Virginia, one of the First Families of Virginia, as well as the earliest of four men of the same name to serve in the Virginia General Assembly. Two others of the same name like him also only served in one legislative session, although William H.B. Custis served in three different sessions of the Virginia House of Delegates as well as the Virginia Secession Convention of 1861, although he was not seated as a U.S. Congressman.

The Netherlands-born younger brother of merchant John Custis II was naturalized with his brother in 1658. At the time, the Custis merchant family had three branches which traded among themselves, one in England and Ireland, the other in the Netherlands and Belgium, and a third in the American colonies. Their father, Henry Custis, had emigrated to Rotterdam in the Netherlands from Gloucester County in England to escape the English Civil Wars, and operated a tavern catering to fellow emigrants, as well as engaged in commerce. Their elder sister Ann married Argoll Yeardley, the son of Sir George Yeardley, who twice served as Governor of the Virginia Colony (where Sir George died in 1627). In 1649 or 1650, John Custis II traveled to Jamestown with his sister and her husband, and William Custis also emigrated to the colony around that time. Argoll Yeardley would serve in the House of Burgesses in 1653, two years before his death.

William Custis married three times. By his first wife (whose name did not survive), he had a son, named after his father and who carried on the family name, but his wife died, as did their younger son (another) John Custis. William Custis remarried, to Joan Hall in Northampton County. She died before 1692 in what had become Accomack County (likewise on Virginia's Eastern Shore), after giving with to three sons (none of whom survived to adulthood) and a daughter, Joanna Mary Custis. William Custis remarried, and was survived by his widow, Bridget Custis, whose daughter Bridget Custis died before 1727.

In 1656, William Custis was suspected of complicity in the murder of Paul Rynmers, but when nothing happened after he followed orders to touch the corpse, Custis was released. In the 1660s, Custis bought 1200 acres of land for a farm; also in that decade a man who killed some of Custis's marked cattle was prosecuted and fined a thousand pounds of tobacco. Custis also filed indentures for several native American boys, as did fellow large landowners. In 1670 William Custis became one of the four justices of the new Accomack County Court, together with Thomas Rydings, Daniel Jenifer and Thomas Brown, who thereby joined Southey Littleton, Charles Scarburgh, Edmund Bowman and John Wise, all of whom jointly administered the county as well as handled trials.

In 1677, Accomack County voters elected Colonel Southey Littleton (who had also been elected the previous year) and Captain William Custis as their (part-time) representatives in the House of Burgesses about a decade after the county on Virginia's Eastern Shore was split and Northampton County created, in part because of controversy over former Speaker Edmund Scarborough, whose daughters would marry into the Custis family. During that term, his brother, General John Custis (who eventually married the twice widowed Tabitha Scarborough Smart Browne), represented Northampton County together with Capt. Isaac Foxcroft.
