= Walter Douglas (colonial administrator) =

British colonial governor

Colonel Walter Douglas (1670–1739) was a British colonial administrator who served as Captain-General and Governor-General of the Leeward Islands from 1711 to 1716.

== Early life and family ==
Walter Douglas was one of seven sons of William Douglas of Baads (d. 1705) and his wife Joan, daughter of James Mason of Park, Blantyre. His brothers included the surgeon John Douglas (d. 1759) and the physician and anatomist James Douglas (1675–1742), both Fellows of the Royal Society.

He is said to have been educated at the University of Utrecht, which he left to join William of Orange during the Glorious Revolution of 1688. He later came under the patronage of the Duke of Queensberry.

== Governor of the Leeward Islands ==
Douglas was appointed Governor of the Leeward Islands in 1711 following the killing of his predecessor, Daniel Parke, during a rebellion in Antigua. He held office until 1716.

In 1711 he was elected a Fellow of the Royal Society.

After his governorship, Douglas was prosecuted in the Court of King's Bench on charges of bribery and extortion. He was found guilty of having demanded large sums of money from the inhabitants of Antigua before issuing a royal pardon to those involved in Parke’s killing. He was fined £500 and sentenced to five years' imprisonment; his fine was later remitted.

== Later life ==
In 1720 Douglas succeeded to the estate of Baads following the renunciation of his brother William, but subsequently sold it. It is thought that he later retired to France.

== Family ==
Douglas married Lady Jane St Leger. They had two sons, including John St Leger Douglas, a West Indian plantation owner. His grandson was John St Leger Douglas, who served as a Member of Parliament.

== See also ==
- British Leeward Islands
- Daniel Parke
- List of governors of the Leeward Islands
- History of Antigua and Barbuda
