= Cheapside, Virginia =

Unincorporated community in Virginia, United States

Coordinates: 37°12′05″N 75°59′03″W

Cheapside is an unincorporated community in Northampton County, Virginia, United States.

The nearby Custis Tombs were listed on the National Register of Historic Places in 1970.
