= Daniel Parke =

British military officer and colonial administrator (1664–1710)

Daniel Parke Jr.
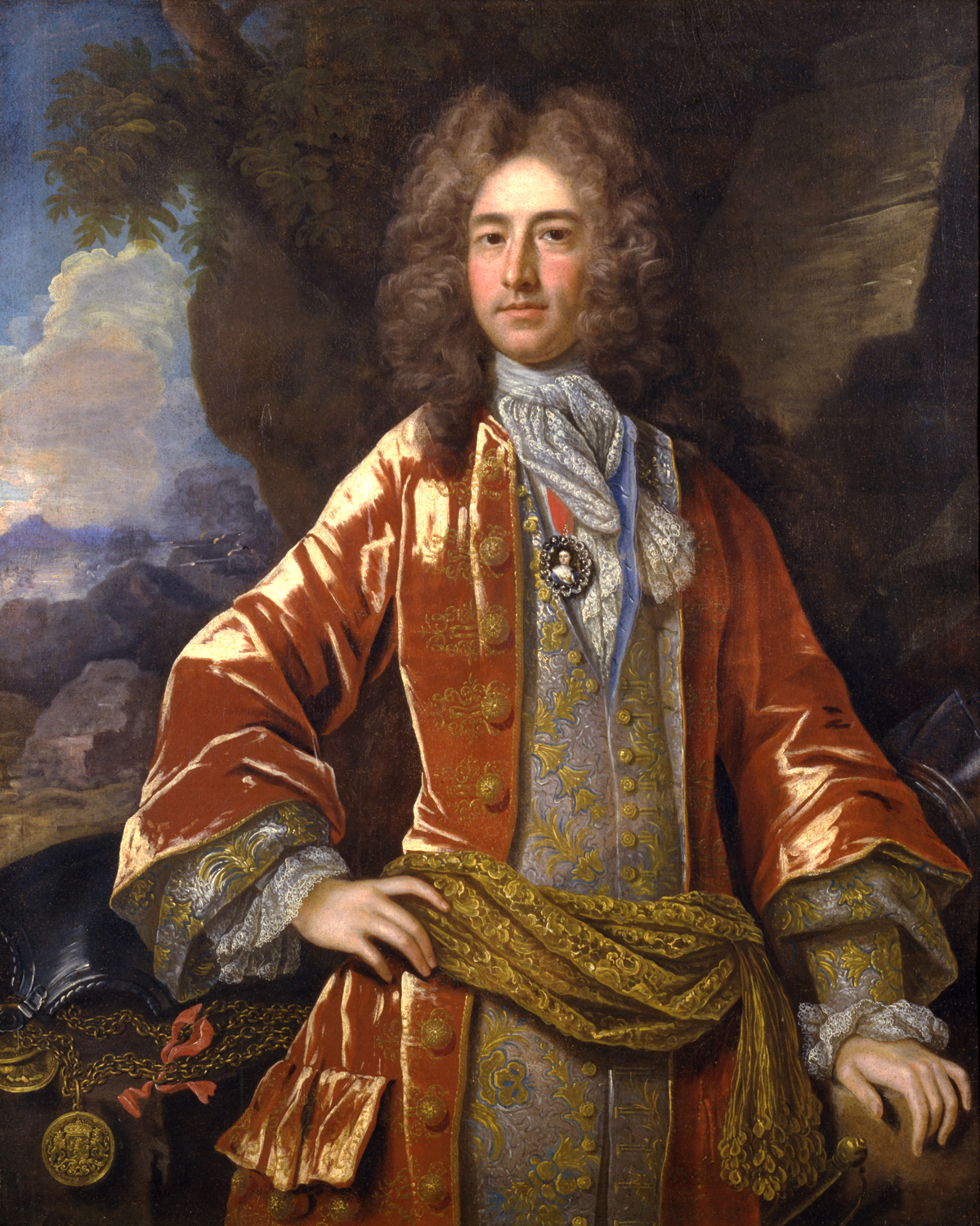
- Portrait by John Closterman, c. 1704–1706

Governor of the Leeward Islands
- In office 1706–1710
- Monarch: Queen Anne
- Preceded by: John Johnson
- Succeeded by: Walter Hamilton

Personal details
- Born: 1664 Queen's Creek, Virginia
- Died: December 7, 1710 (aged 45–46) Antigua, Leeward Islands
- Spouse: Jane Ludwell (m. 1685)
- Children: 5, including Lucy
- Parent(s): Daniel Parke Sr. Rebecca Evelyn
- Profession: Military officer, planter, politician, colonial administrator

Military service
- Allegiance: England
- Rank: Colonel
- Battles/wars: War of the Spanish Succession; Battle of Schellenberg; Battle of Blenheim

Colonel Daniel Parke Jr. (1664 – December 7, 1710) was a British military officer, planter, politician and colonial administrator who served as the governor of the Leeward Islands from 1706 to 1710, when he was lynched by a mob in Antigua. Best known for his military service in Europe under the Duke of Marlborough during the War of the Spanish Succession, Parke was the only governor in British America to be murdered.

Born in 1664 in the colony of Virginia into a prominent colonial family, Parke was sent to England at a young age before returning to English North America in 1674. In 1685, he married Jane Ludwell, the daughter of colonial official Philip Ludwell. Parke returned to Virginia after a second stay in England and pursued a career in politics, being elected to the House of Burgesses in 1693 and appointed to sit on the Governor's Council in 1695.

In 1701, he moved to England for a second time and in the next year began serving as an aide-de-camp to Marlborough after the War of the Spanish Succession broke out. After the 1704 Battle of Blenheim, he personally delivered the duke's victory dispatch to Queen Anne. Parke did not receive the governorship of Virginia as he had hoped, and instead was subsequently appointed as the governor of the British Leeward Islands in 1706.

Parke travelled to Antigua in 1706, focusing his efforts on improving colonial fortifications and suppressing smuggling. Popular discontent against his administration resulted in two assassination attempts against him. In December 1710, tensions came to a head between Parke and the island's colonists as a mob of militiamen attacked his house, murdering him. After his death, Parke's estates and debts were passed onto his children.

== Early life ==
Coat of Arms of Daniel Parke

Daniel Parke Jr. was born in 1664 in the English colony of Virginia. He was probably born in Queen's Creek, York County on his father's plantation. His father was Daniel Parke, an Englishman who worked as a merchant in London before immigrating to English North America and becoming a planter and politician who sat on the Virginia Governor's Council. His mother was Rebecca Knipe, who was a cousin of famed diarist John Evelyn.

Growing up, Parke was sent by his parents to be educated in England, living under the care of his mother's English family in Wotton House, Surrey. In 1674, he was sent back to Virginia; his father died five years later. In 1685, Parke married Jane Ludwell, the daughter of planter Philip Ludwell. Five years later, he travelled to England with Ludwell to lodge official complaints about the conduct of the royal governor of Virginia, Nathaniel Bacon.

After staying in England for two years, Parke once again returned to Virginia in 1692. He subsequently decided to embark on a career in politics, and was elected to the House of Burgesses a year later. In 1695, Parke was appointed to sit on the Virginia Governor's Council. His nascent political career was rife with tensions as he engaged in several disputes and feuds with other politicians, eventually moving back to England in 1701.

== Military career ==
In 1702, England joined the War of the Spanish Succession, declaring war on France. Parke subsequently attached himself to the English Army as an aide-de-camp to John Churchill, 1st Earl of Marlborough, a senior commander in the army. When Marlborough was dispatched to the Low Countries to take command of a Grand Alliance army of English, Dutch and German troops, Parke accompanied him as part of his general staff.

During the war, Parke claimed to hold the rank of colonel and was referred to as such by his European contemporaries. However, historian James Falkner noted that there is no reference to any commission held by Parke in English Army commission lists and registers of the period; Falkner argued that his colonelcy, if it actually existed, was most likely acquired in the Virginia militia. Parke did make several attempts to acquire an officer's commission in the English Army while in Europe, though these were consistently rebuffed.

On 2 July 1704, Parke participated in the Battle of Schellenberg, a Grand Alliance victory over a combined Bavarian and French army in Southern Germany. During the battle, he was involved in storming a hill near Donauwörth, being wounded in both ankles by enemy fire. Despite his injuries, he had sufficiently recovered to be at Marlborough's side on 13 August 1704 for the next major battle of the war at Blenheim, which was fought near the village of Höchstädt between a Grand Alliance army and a Franco-Bavarian force; the battle resulted in an allied victory.

After the battle, Marlborough wrote a dispatch message describing his victory, which stated in part that "I... beg you will give my duty to the Queen, and let her know her army has had a glorious victory." He handed it to Parke and charged him with delivering it to Queen Anne in London. Parke rode via horseback for eight days non-stop, personally delivering the note to the queen in Windsor Castle, Berkshire. In gratitude for his actions, the queen rewarded him with a bejewelled portrait miniature of herself, an annual gratuity of 1,000 pounds, and her personal thanks.

Parke claimed that Marlborough had offered him the position of governor of Virginia in reward for his military service in Europe. However, after returning to England, he discovered that George Hamilton, 1st Earl of Orkney had been appointed to the position instead. Infuriated, he petitioned for an equivalent position, and was offered the governorship of the Leeward Islands, which were host to a number of English colonial possessions. Parke reluctantly accepted the posting, writing that it was "the hardest taske of all the Queen's Governors, tho' the least sallary."

== Governorship and murder ==
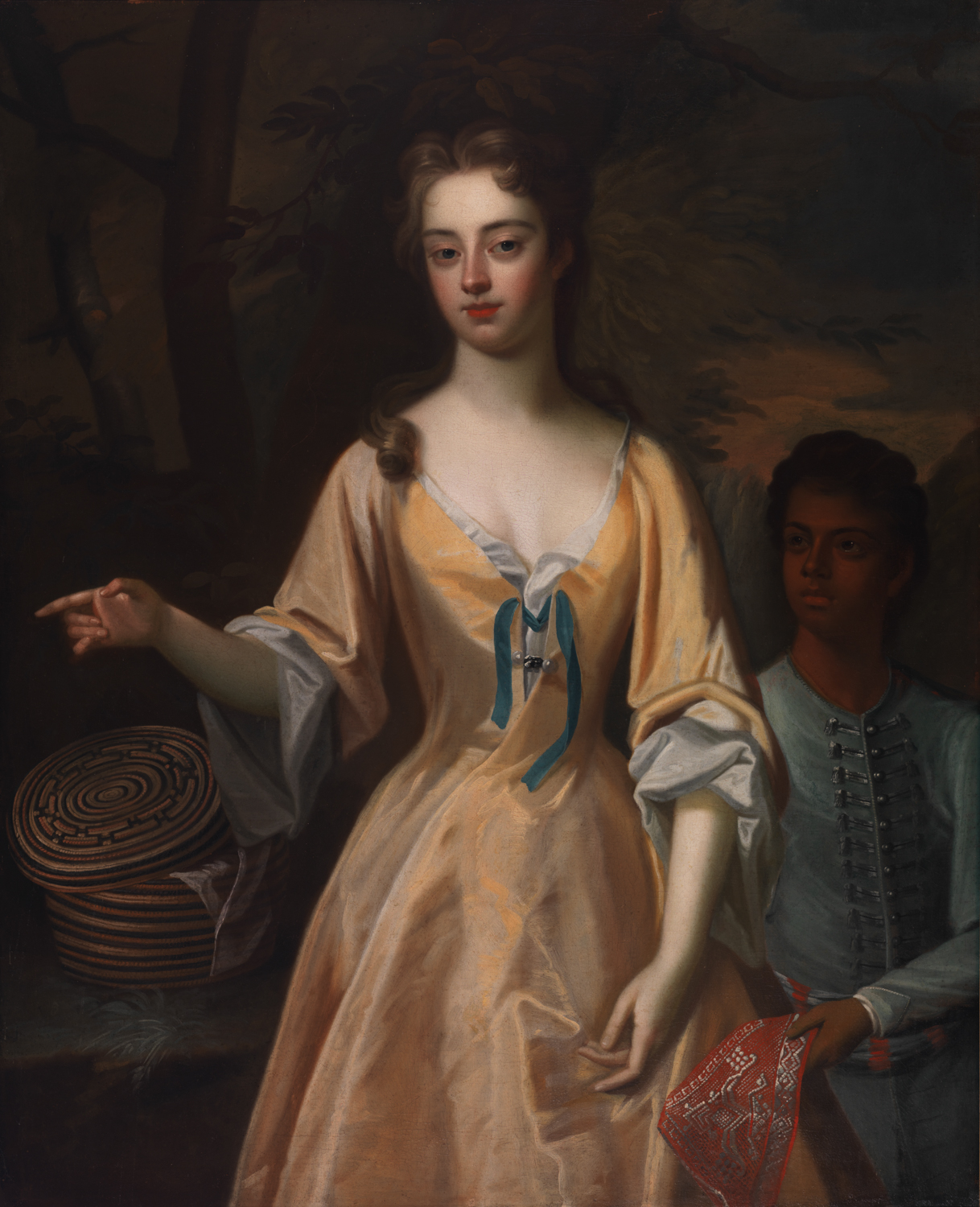
A 1716 portrait of Lucy, Parke's legitimate daughter

On 14 July 1706, Parke arrived by ship in the English colony of Antigua. After officially assuming the role of governor, his first months in office were occupied with directing efforts to improve the fortifications of the Leeward Islands in order to defend the region against French attacks by sea; he also engaged in efforts to suppress smuggling activities carried out by colonial planters. However, Falkner noted that Parke's "commendable vigour was unmatched by any sense of tact."

During his tenure as governor, he quickly made enemies with several members of the colonial elite, including fellow administrator Christopher Codrington and local Royal African Company factor Edward Chester. Parke used his powers as governor to confiscate estates owned by Codrington, who responded by stirring up colonial discontent against him; Chester's anger against Parke stemmed from discovering that he was engaged in an open sexual affair with Chester's wife.

Shocked by the lawless state of the Leeward Islands, he embarked on a campaign to restore the rule of law to the region. During his tenure as governor, Parke was subjected to two assassination attempts from discontented colonists. The first assassin shot at an army officer who he had mistaken for Parke. The second attempt was carried out by a Black marksman (named Sandy or Alexander) who was hired by the Rev. James Field, which also failed to kill him.

In the first week of December 1710, the governor's council requested Parke to convene the colonial legislature in order to address concerns over a potential French invasion as part of the ongoing war. Disputes between Parke and the legislature (including the granting of privateering commissions to known pirates such as Jacob Hall and John Ham) led its members to ask him to leave Antigua and allow its colonists to manage their own defences, which he rejected. A group of infuriated colonists then conspired to overthrow his governorship by force, and called out the colonial militia.

On December 7, a rowdy mob formed of the Antiguan militia attacked Parke's residence, which was defended by a small detachment of grenadiers (from a British Army regiment known as Luke Lillingstone's Regiment of Foot) and six of his associates. The militia overwhelmed the soldiers, killing and wounding several before storming the house and capturing Parke, who was dragged outside his residence, stripped naked, and brutally beaten to death. His last words to the mob were reportedly: "Gentlemen, you have no sense of honor left, pray have some of humanity."

== Personal life, family and legacy ==
According to Falkner, Parke was "energetic, colourful, and contentious character, wilful and headstrong to an astonishing degree" though also "self-seeking and sublimely indifferent to the opinion of others." Despite his violent temperament and frequent propensity to engage in feuds, Marlborough frequently expressed praise for his military abilities during the War of the Spanish Succession. After his death, he was succeeded as governor in 1711 by Walter Douglas, who chose not to pursue charges against any of the individuals involved with his murder.

Parke had three daughters with his wife, Frances, Lucy and Evelin, before she died in 1708 in "circumstances owing to his neglect". Evelin died in 1696 while Frances married John Custis and Lucy married William Byrd II, both in 1706. He also had children with two mistresses: the first was a son named Julius who was sired with a Mrs. Barry after meeting her in England (she gave birth after they returned to Virginia in 1692) and the second was a daughter named Lucy whom Parke acknowledged as his child. Her mother was Catharine Chester, the wife of Edward Chester.

In addition to his political career in Virginia, he attempted to gain a seat in the English Parliament after he travelled back to England in 1701, purchasing land in Whitchurch, Hampshire. Parke ran as a candidate for the constituency of Malmesbury in the 1701 English general election as a Whig candidate, though his attempts to rig the election were uncovered and he was not elected. Upon learning of his autocratic rule in the Leeward Islands prior to his murder, English government officials quietly supported Douglas' decision not to pursue charges against Parke's murderers.

After his death, his estates in England, Virginia and Antigua came under dispute by various claimants who disputed his last will; Parke had acquired extensive debts throughout his life, and his bequests to Julius infuriated his legitimate daughters. His debts were partially transferred onto Frances, who along with her husband spent years contesting their payment, while some of Parke's slaves were transferred to William Byrd II. The illegitimate Lucy spent over three decades successfully defending her ownership of Parke's Antiguan estates in colonial courts.

Legal offices
Preceded by John Johnson	Governor of the Leeward Islands; 1706 – 1710	Succeeded by Walter Hamilton
