= Ophelia Settle Egypt =

American sociologist

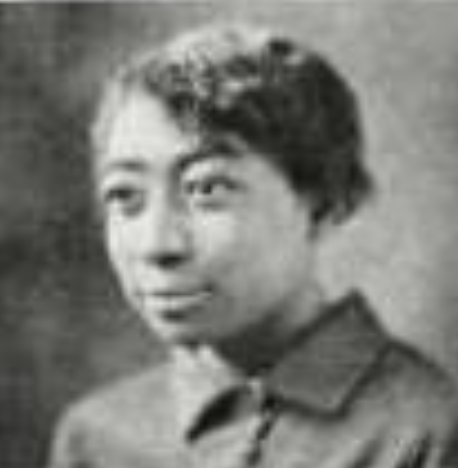
- E. Ophelia Settle, from the 1925 Howard University yearbook
- Born: Ophelia Settle; February 20, 1903; Clarksville, Texas
- Died: May 25, 1984 (aged 81); Washington, D.C.
- Occupations: Social worker, college educator, writer

Ophelia Settle Egypt (February 20, 1903 – May 25, 1984), also known as E. Ophelia Settle, was a social worker, educator, sociologist and writer who conducted some of the first oral history interviews with formerly enslaved people.

== Early life and education ==
Ophelia Settle Egypt was born as Ophelia Settle near Clarksville, Texas in 1903, the daughter of Green Wilson Settle and Sara Garth Settle. Her father was a schoolteacher. Egypt graduated from high school in Denver, Colorado in 1921, and from Howard University in 1925.

She earned a master's degree in sociology from the University of Pennsylvania in 1944, and pursued further studies at Columbia University School of Social Work. Egypt studied medicine and sociology at Washington University on a fellowship from the National Society for the Prevention of Blindness, but as a black woman she was considered a "special student", and required to take lessons privately from a tutor. Egypt later earned an advanced certificate from the Pennsylvania School of Social Work for her work towards a PhD.

== Career ==
Egypt taught in North Carolina during the year after she graduated from Howard University. She was a research assistant for the black sociologist Charles S. Johnson at Fisk University in Nashville, Tennessee from 1928 to 1930. Under Johnson, she conducted one hundred interviews with elderly formerly enslaved people. Her interviews were part of Fisk University's publication “Unwritten History of Slavery: Autobiographical Accounts of Negro Ex-Slaves (Social Science Source Document No. 1).”

From 1933 to 1935, Egypt served as a caseworker in St. Louis, Missouri. In 1935, Egypt became director of social services at Dillard University in Louisiana. From 1935 to 1939, Egypt worked in New Orleans as the director of the medical social work program for Flint Goodridge Hospital.

She taught social work at Howard University in the 1940s. Egypt also worked at Howard University's School of Social Work from 1939 to 1951 while she helped develop the Social Work Program. In the 1950s, she worked as a probation officer in the D.C. Juvenile Court. Later, Egypt worked as a social worker in southeast Washington, D.C., and directed a home for black "unwed mothers" at the Ionia R. Whipper Home.

In Washington D.C., Egypt founded Parkland's first Planned Parenthood clinic in 1956. This clinic was renamed the Ophelia Egypt Clinic in 1981. In 1973, Egypt was a member of the D.C. Black Writers Workshop, and wrote a biography of James Weldon Johnson for young readers, published in 1974. She corresponded with writer Langston Hughes, among other notable acquaintances. She gave an oral history interview in 1981 and 1982, to the Moorland-Spingarn Research Center.

== Personal life and legacy ==
Ophelia Settle married educator Ivory Lester Egypt in 1940. They had a son, Ivory Lester Jr., born in 1942. The Parklands Planned Parenthood Clinic was named for Egypt in 1981.

In 1984, Egypt died from lung problems in Washington, D.C. at Providence Hospital, aged 81 years.

The Ophelia Egypt Papers, including photographs and manuscripts, are archived in the manuscript division, Howard University Library. These papers are from Egypt's work in the 1930s.
