= Capeville, Virginia =

Unincorporated community in Virginia, United States

Coordinates: 37°12′11″N 75°57′26″W

Capeville is an unincorporated community in Northampton County, Virginia, United States.

The Arlington Archeological Site was listed on the National Register of Historic Places in 2008.
