= Daniel Parke Custis =

American planter and politician (1711–1757)

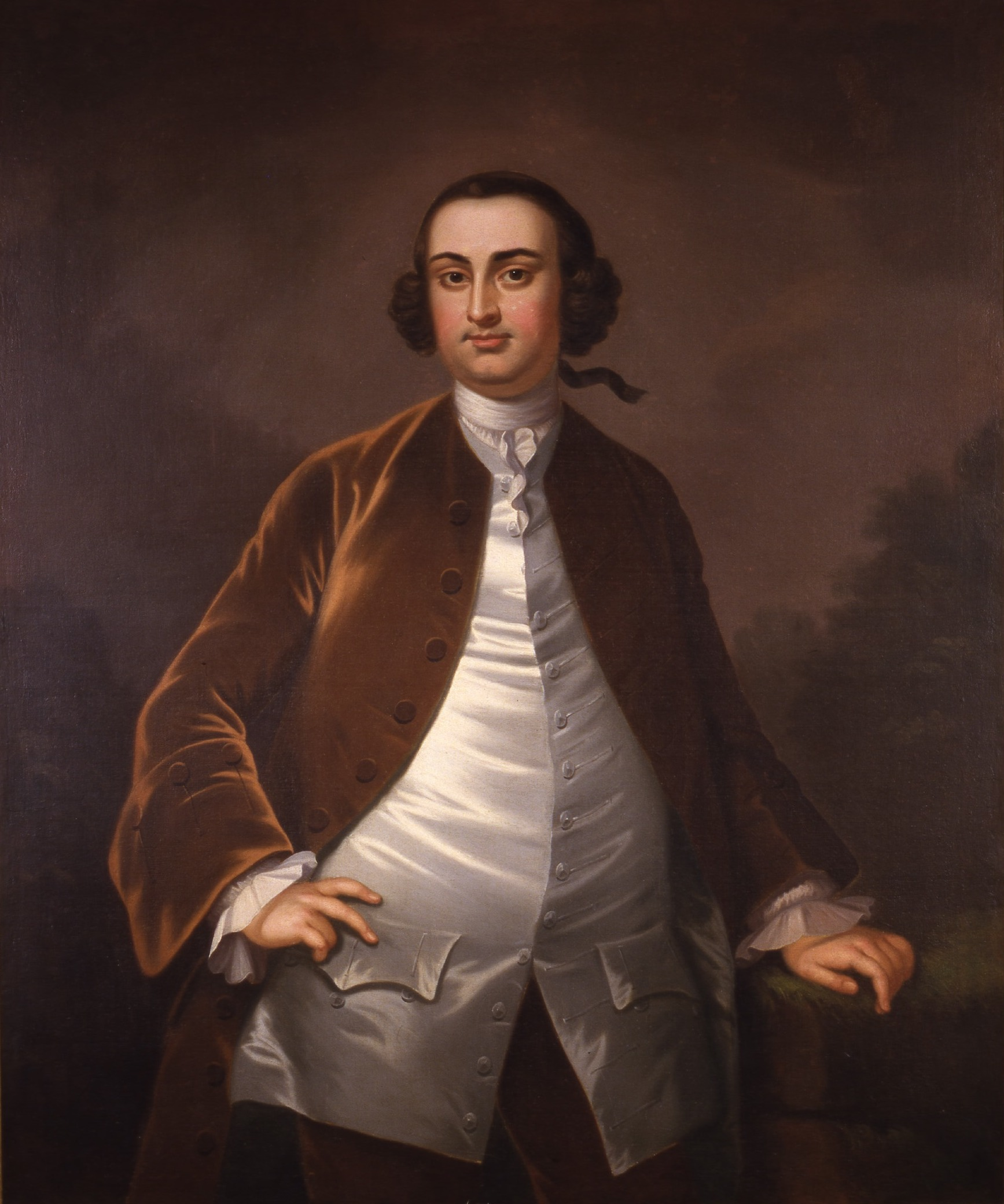
- Portrait by John Wollaston, 1757
- Born: October 15, 1711; York County, Virginia, British America
- Died: July 8, 1757 (aged 45); New Kent County, Virginia, British America
- Resting place: Bruton Parish Episcopal Church Cemetery
- Occupations: Planter and Politician
- Spouse: Martha Dandridge (m. 1750)
- Children: Daniel Parke Custis Jr. Frances Parke Custis; John Parke "Jacky" Custis; Martha "Patsy" Parke Custis
- Parent(s): John Custis IV; Frances Parke Custis
- Relatives: Daniel Parke (maternal grandfather)

Daniel Parke Custis (October 15, 1711 – July 8, 1757) was an American planter and politician who was the first husband of Martha Dandridge. After his death, his widow, Martha Dandridge Custis, married George Washington who later became the first president of the United States.

== Early life and career ==
Lieutenant colonel's commission in the New Kent County militia issued to Custis by Governor Sir William Gooch on August 8, 1740

Custis was born in York County, Virginia, on October 15, 1711. He was one of two children of John Custis IV (1678–1749), a powerful member of Virginia's Governor's Council, and Frances Parke Custis. The Custis family was one of the wealthiest and most socially prominent of Virginia. Custis' mother, Frances, was the daughter of Daniel Parke, a political enemy of the Custises, and his wife.

As Daniel Custis was the sole male heir in the Custis family, he inherited the plantations and slaves owned by his father. However, Custis did not choose to take a leading role in colonial Virginia politics.

== Marriage and children ==
At the age of 37, Custis met 16-year-old Martha Dandridge at St. Peter's Church, which they both attended. He was also a vestryman. His father, John Custis, disapproved of the relationship, but eventually relented. After a two-year courtship, Custis and Dandridge were married on May 15, 1750. The couple lived at Custis's plantation called the White House in New Kent County, Virginia.

They had four children:

- Daniel Parke Custis, Jr. (November 19, 1751 – February 19, 1754)
- Frances Parke Custis (April 12, 1753 – April 1, 1757)
- John Parke "Jacky" Custis (November 27, 1754 – November 5, 1781)
- Martha Parke "Patsy" Custis (1756 – June 19, 1773)

== Death ==
Custis died on July 8, 1757, in New Kent County, Virginia, with some historians stating the cause of death as a heart attack, but others stating that he died from a severe throat infection.

Custis is buried in the graveyard of the Bruton Parish Church in Williamsburg, Virginia beside two of his children, Daniel Parke Custis, Jr., and Frances Parke Custis. Eighteen months after Custis died, his widow Martha married George Washington on January 6, 1759.

== Estate ==
As Custis died intestate, or "without a will", his widow Martha received the lifetime use of one third of his property (known as a "dower share"), and the other two thirds were held in trust for their children. The January 1759 Custis estate also included at least 85 slaves. According to the Mount Vernon slave census, by 1799 the dower share included 153 slaves. The October 1759 Custis estate inventory listed 17,779 acres (71.95 km^{2}), or 27.78 square miles of land, spread over five counties.

Upon Martha Custis' marriage to George Washington in 1759, her dower share came under his control, pursuant to the common law doctrine of seisin jure uxoris. He also became guardian of her two minor children, and administrator of the Custis estate. John Parke Custis was the only child to reach his majority, upon which he inherited the non-dower two-thirds of his father's estate.

Upon George Washington's death on December 14, 1799, the dower share and slaves reverted to Martha. Through a provision in his will, Washington directed that his 124 slaves be freed following his wife's death. As Washington stated in his will, he "earnestly wished" to free his own slaves at the time of his death but acknowledged that doing so would create "insuperable difficulties" because they had intermarried with Martha's "dower negroes," over whom he had no authority. He also believed that it would "excite the most painful sensations" and "disagreeable consequences" to attempt to separate them.

Washington's slaves were not part of the Custis estate, and Martha had no legal power to free them or the dower slaves, but they were freed at her request on January 1, 1801. The principal reason that Martha gave for requesting that her husband's slaves be set free is that she was concerned about her personal safety. Washington's slaves, having found out that they would be free upon her death, were suspected of wanting to hasten her death. They were also perceived as being restive and were believed to have been the cause of several suspicious fires on the Mount Vernon estate.

Martha Washington died on May 22, 1802, having outlived all four of her children. Because of her dower share, the Daniel Parke Custis Estate could not be liquidated for more than 45 years. The dower share was eventually divided among John Parke Custis's widow, Eleanor Calvert Custis Stuart, and their four children. Martha bequeathed Elisha, the one slave she owned herself, to her grandson George Washington Parke Custis.
