= John Custis =

American planter and politician (1678–1749)

Coordinates: 37.2291°N 76.0037°W

John Custis Esq.
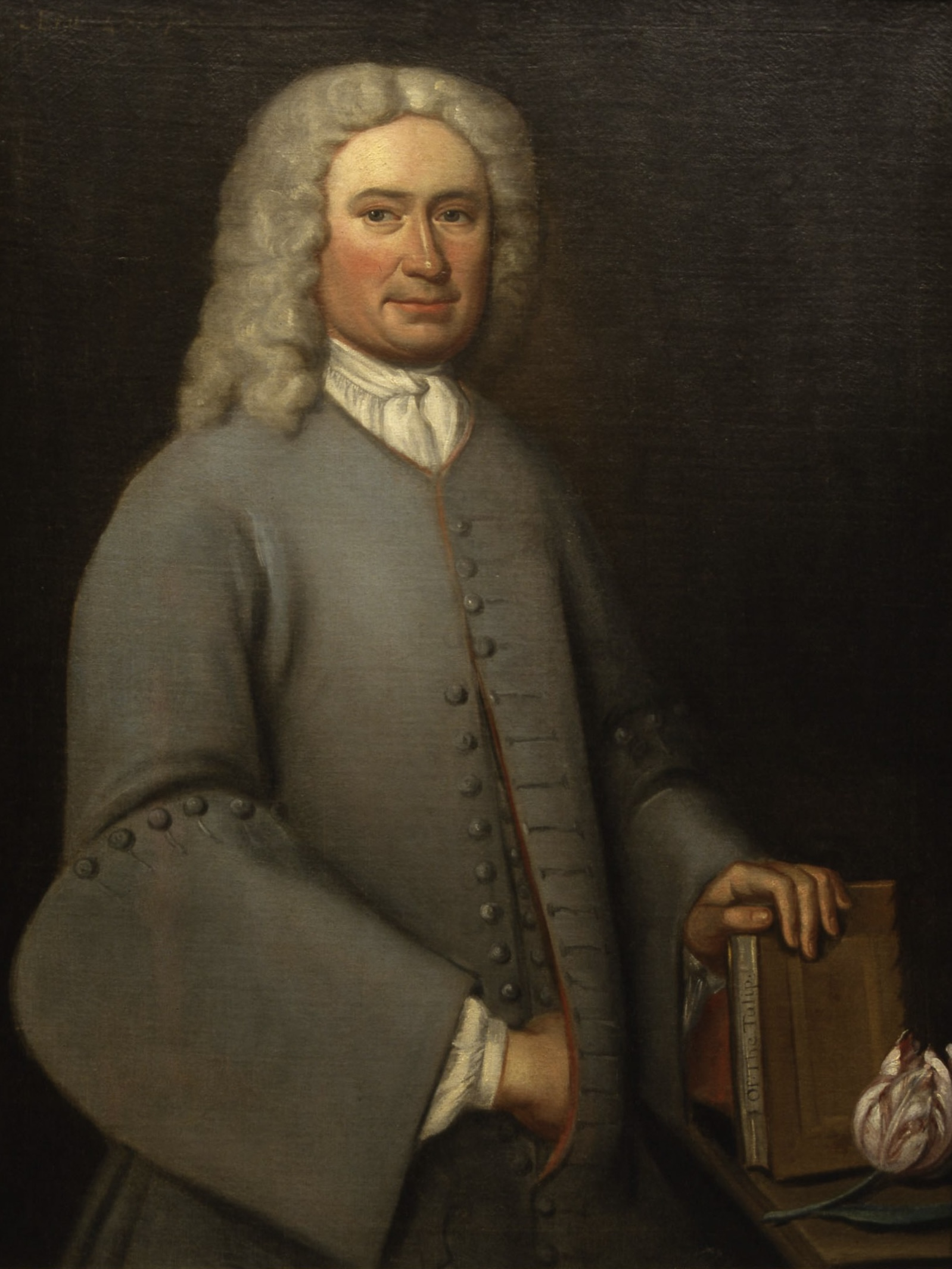
- Portrait by Charles Bridges, c. 1735–1744

Member of the House of Burgesses for Northampton County
- In office 1705–1706 Serving with William Waters
- Preceded by: Benjamin Nottingham
- Succeeded by: Benjamin Nottingham

Member of the House of Burgesses for the College of William & Mary
- In office 1718–1719
- Preceded by: Peter Beverley
- Succeeded by: Thomas Jones

Personal details
- Born: August 1678 Arlington plantation, Virginia
- Died: November 22, 1749 (aged 71) Williamsburg, Virginia
- Spouse: Frances Parke (m. 1706)
- Children: 5
- Parents: John Custis III (father); Margaret Michael Custis (mother)
- Profession: Planter, politician

Military service
- Allegiance: British America (1735–1749)
- Branch/service: Virginia Militia (1735–1749)
- Rank: Colonel

Colonel John Custis IV (August 1678 – November 22, 1749) was an American planter, politician, government official and military officer who sat in the House of Burgesses from 1705 to 1706 and 1718 to 1719, representing Northampton County, Virginia, and the College of William & Mary. A prominent member of the Custis family of Virginia, he utilized his extensive landholdings to support a career in horticulture and gardening.

Born in 1678 into a slaveholding family who resided in Northampton County, Virginia, Custis was sent to London at a young age to study the tobacco trade under Micajah Perry. He returned to his grandfather's plantation at Arlington in 1699 to familiarize himself in the management of slaves. In 1705, he was elected to the Virginia General Assembly, sitting there for a year. Custis married Frances Parke, the eldest daughter of Daniel Parke, in 1706.

In 1714, his father John died, passing control of the family estates to Custis, which included two plantations and numerous slaves. His wife died two years later, and in 1717, Custis moved to Williamsburg, Virginia. There, he revived his interest in political affairs and was again elected to the general assembly for another year. In 1727, Custis was appointed to serve on the Governor's Council of Virginia, having established himself in Williamsburg.

Custis purchased the White House plantation in 1735, arranging for his son and heir Daniel to manage it. Over the last decades of his life, Custis grew increasingly ill, and was removed from his position on the Governor's Council in August 1749. On November 14, 1749, he wrote his will and testament, dying eight days later on November 22. Custis' body was buried in the family cemetery near Cheapside, and his estate passed over to Daniel's control.

== Early life ==
John Custis was born in August 1678 at the Arlington plantation in Northampton County, Virginia. Custis' father was John Custis III (also known as John Custis of Wilsonia), a prominent planter and member of the Custis family of Virginia who sat on the Governor's Council. His mother was Margaret Michael Custis, who went on to have six more children after 1678. She died while giving birth to her second daughter from complications during childbirth. (Note: Custis' father named his second daughter Sorrowful Margaret Custis.)

As the firstborn son, his parents arranged for Custis to receive an education from private tutors. His grandfather, John Custis II, eventually sent him to study under tobacco merchant and politician Micajah Perry in England. After returning to Virginia, once Custis reached the legal age of 21 in 1699, he was sent to his grandfather's slave plantation in Arlington to study the Virginian tobacco trade and how to manage the enslaved population there.

In 1705, Custis was elected to the House of Burgesses, the lower house of the General Assembly of Virginia, representing Northampton County. Unlike his father, Custis only served a single term in the House of Burgesses, choosing not to run for re-election in 1706. On May 4, 1706, he married heiress Frances Parke, who was the eldest daughter of Daniel Parke. Custis was appointed as a justice of the peace in the same year.

== Political career ==
Despite living in the same house with his wife from their marriage onwards, the relationship between Custis and Frances soon became strained to the point where both refused to speak with each other, instead communicating through their enslaved servants, including a manservant named Pompey. According to their great-grandson, the antiquarian George Washington Parke Custis, their marriage was one where "the connubial bliss was short."

On January 26, 1714, Custis' father died, and the family estate passed into his control. (Note: Custis' father died after suffering from gout and arthritis.) This included 7,000 acres (2,800 ha) of land (consisting of Arlington and another plantation located in Northumberland County) and 30 slaves. On March 14, 1715, Frances died from smallpox at Arlington. Two years later in 1717, Custis relocated from his plantation to the city of Williamsburg, the capital of Virginia which hosted the General Assembly.

There, Custis revived his interest in politics, once again standing for election to the House of Burgesses. He ran for the seat of the College of William & Mary, which had been established in 1693 and subsequently granted a seat in the house. Voters affiliated with the college elected him to the House of Burgesses, where Custis continued to sit until 1718. During this period, his plantation at Arlington burned down, and Custis eventually decided against rebuilding the property, due to the fact that growing and selling tobacco was becoming less profitable.

Not wishing to reside at his father's Northumberland County plantation, Custis instead settled down in Williamsburg, living there for the rest of his life. In the city, he ordered the construction of an elaborate colonial mansion called the Six Chimney House, where Custis was attended to by numerous enslaved servants. Next to the house, Custis arranged for a large 4-acre (16,000 m^{2}) garden to be planted, reflecting an emerging interest in horticulture that saw him correspond with American and English naturalists such as John Bartram, Mark Catesby, and Peter Collinson.

Custis was appointed to serve on the Governor's Council on September 11, 1727. Eight years later, he purchased the White House, a plantation situated along the Pamunkey River in New Kent County from fellow planter John Lightfoot III and inherited the plantation's slaves. Custis then sent his son Daniel, who was twenty-five years old by that point, to manage the White House and learn how to oversee the daily operations of a slave plantation. During this time, Custis was recorded as having been commissioned into the Virginia Militia, holding the rank of colonel by 1735.

== Later life and death ==
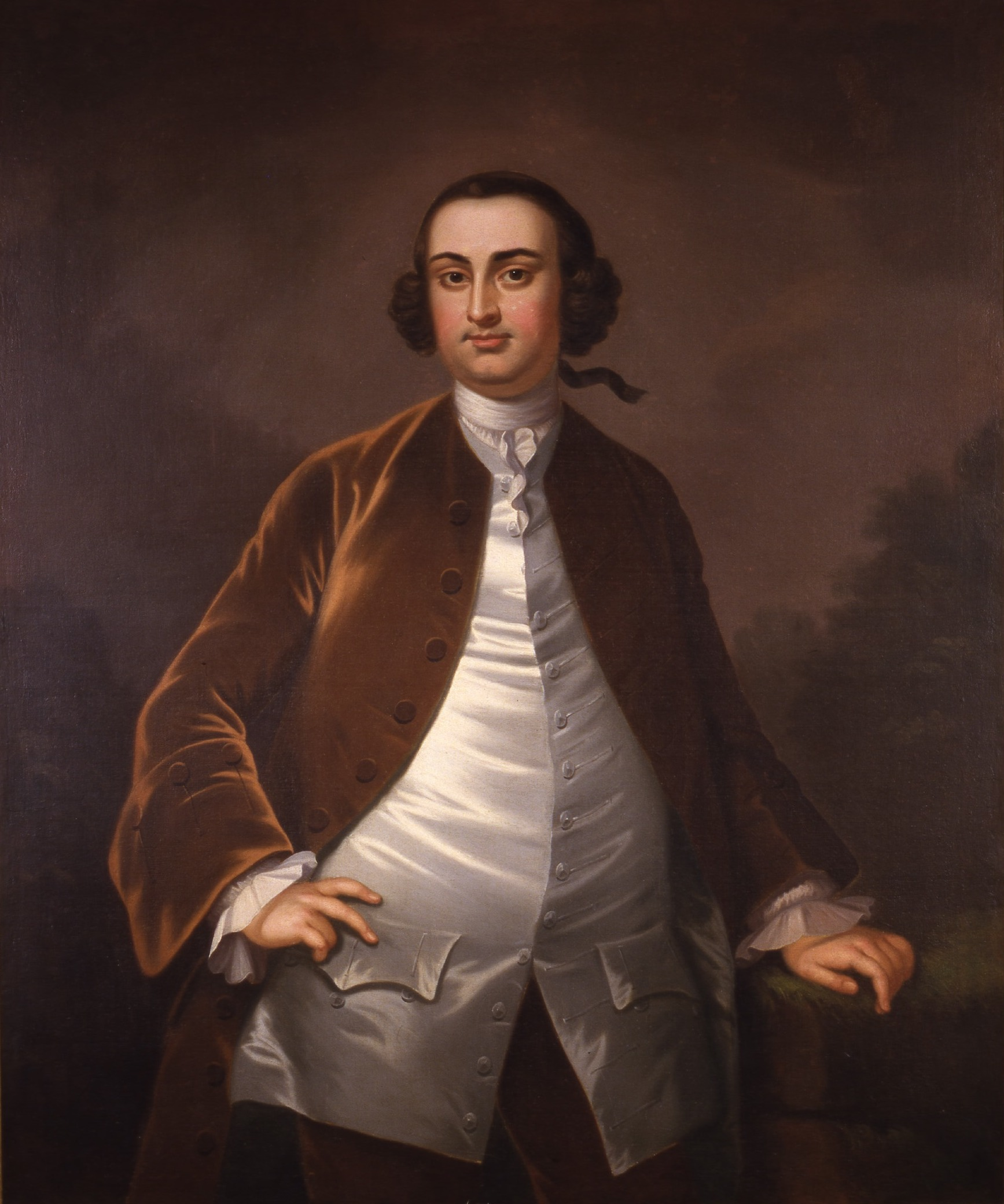
A 1757 portrait of Daniel Parke Custis by John Wollaston

As Custis grew older he started to experience several issues with his health, which led him to correspond with his contacts in the horticultural sphere and seek curative advice. In 1742, Collinson wrote him a letter with a list of suggested medical treatments, which Custis responded to by writing that it was "impossible... to take a case... without seeing the patient". Custis continued to expand his garden at Williamsburg during this period, planting several fir and pine trees.

In 1744, Custis issued a petition to the governor of Virginia, Sir William Gooch and the Governor's Council, successfully asking that they manumit an enslaved child who Custis fathered and thought should be free. As noted by Henry Wiencek, the petition was incredibly unusual in Virginia, particularly coming from a wealthy planter such as Custis. The petition stated in part that the child was "Christened John but commonly called Jack, born of... his Negro wench, Alice."

At the age of 37, Daniel met 16-year-old Martha Dandridge at St. Peter's Church in New Kent, Virginia, in New Kent County, Virginia, near Talleysville, Virginia, where he served as a vestryman and she attended services regularly. The pair soon formed a romantic relationship; Custis initially opposed Daniel being together with Martha due to her family's relatively poor financial status, though he ultimately relented. (Note: When Custis heard about the proposal, he initially threatened to disinherit his son if he went through with the marriage. He eventually changed his mind after Martha arranged a meeting with him, with Custis concluding that she was "beautifull & sweet temper'd".) The couple eventually married on May 15, 1750, after a prolonged courtship which lasted roughly two years.

Over the last decades of his life, Custis grew increasingly sick, to the point where he was removed from the Governor's Council on August 26, 1749, after being too impaired to serve his duties properly. (Note: Prior to his death, Custis had suffered several medical issues since the 1710s. These included headaches, photophobia, arthralgia and yaws, the last of which he had contracted from his slaves.) He also started to write his last will and testament, completing it by November 14, 1749, and dying on November 22 in Williamsburg. Custis' body was, per his own last will, buried near Cheapside, Virginia, in the Custis Tombs, the familial cemetery of the Arlington plantation.

As he was the sole legitimate heir, Custis willed that his plantations would pass into Daniel's possession; this included the White House, where he and Martha moved to after their marriage. Custis also instructed Daniel to arrange for the following phrase to be inscribed on his gravestone: "Yet lived but Seven years which was the Space of time he kept a Batchelors House at Arlington on the Eastern Shoar of Virginia." George Washington Parke Custis claimed that the inscription was meant to "perpetuate [the] infelicity" of his troubled marriage.

== Personal life, family and legacy ==
Over the course of his marriage, "held together less by love than land and inheritance", Custis had four children with Frances. Two of his sons died young, while a daughter, Frances, married but died childless before November 1749 without producing any children of her own; Daniel was their sole son to reach adulthood. Both of Custis' children who died young were buried at the Custis Tombs. When Daniel died on July 8, 1757, at New Kent County (most likely due to a sudden heart attack), he was buried in the parish graveyard of the Bruton Parish Church in Williamsburg.

Though Custis married his wife in part due to her wealth, the extensive debts that her father accrued during his lifetime were transferred to his daughter after he was lynched by a mob in Antigua on December 7, 1710. These debts proved to be larger than Parke's estate, forcing Custis and Daniel to spend large amounts of effort contesting them. Custis later wrote that he considered his pre-marital life at Arlington to be the happiest years of his life, and Custis' "prickly personality and frigid marriage" with Frances would "[generate] gossip that came down through the centuries".

In addition to his horticultural activities, Custis also eventually cultivated an interest in art collecting. In 1723, he wrote a letter to his friend William Byrd II, who was on a visit to London at the time, requesting that he acquire "two pieces of as good painting as you can procure", which Custis intended on placing "in the Summer before my chimneys to hide the fireplace." Two years later in 1725, Custis commissioned English painter Charles Bridges to paint a portrait of him, which as of 2008 resides in an art collection in the Washington and Lee University in Lexington, Virginia.

After inheriting his plantations, Daniel quietly settled down in Virginia as a member of the colonial plantocracy. Together with Martha, he had four children, though only two survived past childhood, a son named John and a daughter named Martha. The shock of losing two of his children was speculated by George Washington Parke Custis to have contributed to Daniel's early death in 1757 at the age of forty-five. Martha married George Washington, a prominent planter and soldier who would go on to lead the Continental Army in the American Revolutionary War and become the 1st President of the United States.
