= Arlington Archeological Site =

Archaeological site in Virginia, United States

- U.S. National Register of Historic Places
- Virginia Landmarks Register
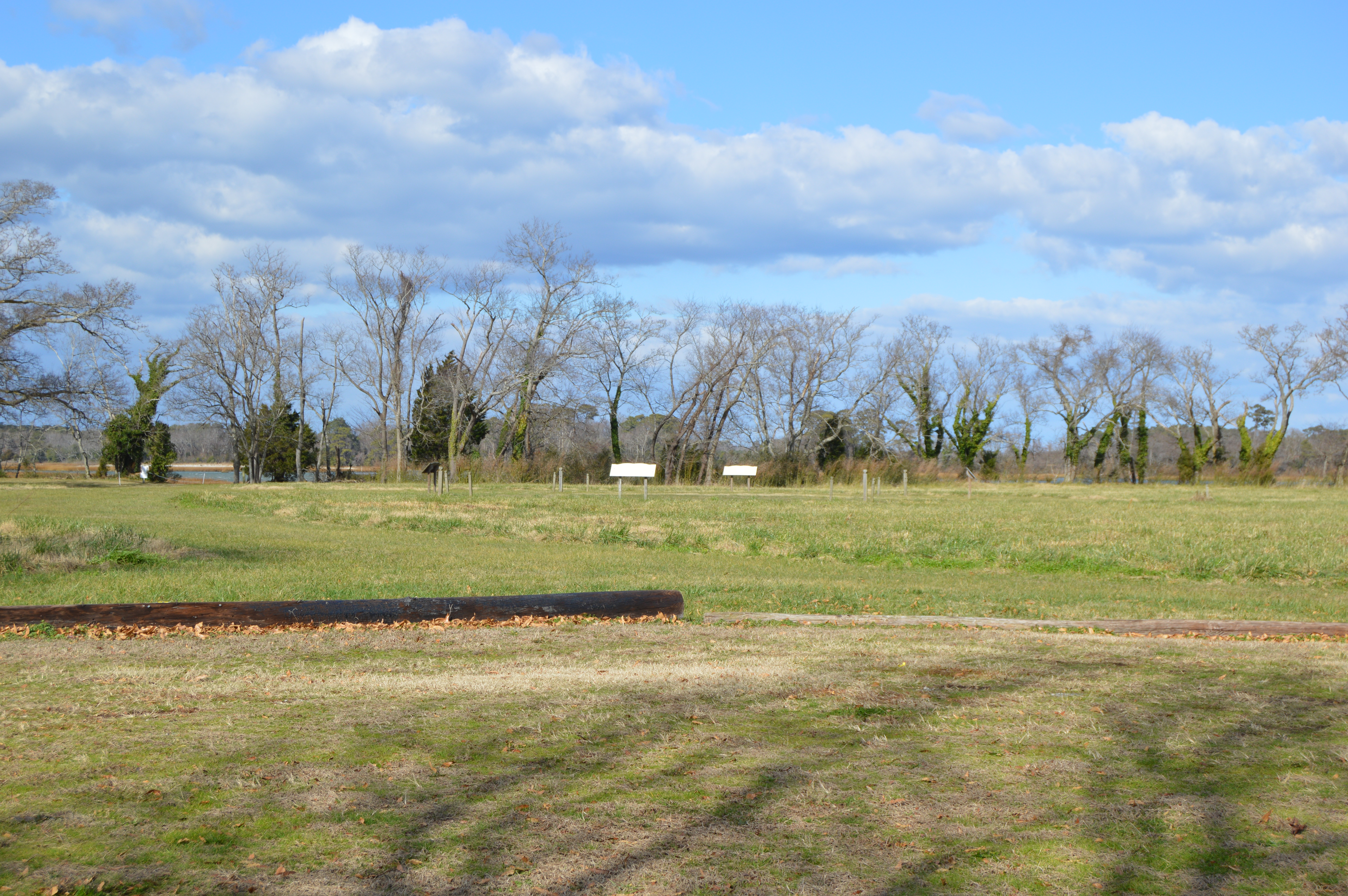
- Overview, with interpretive signage in the distance
- Nearest city: Capeville, Virginia
- Area: 7.3 acres (3.0 ha)
- Built: 1614
- NRHP reference No.: 08000422
- VLR No.: 065-0001

Significant dates
- Added to NRHP: May 12, 2008
- Designated VLR: March 20, 2008

Arlington Archeological Site is a historic archaeological site located near Capeville, Northampton County, Virginia. It is located east of the Custis Tombs. The site includes archaeological features ranging from Accomack Plantation, the first English settlement of the Eastern Shore in 1619, to probable tenant or slave quarter features dating to the second half of the 18th century. The site also includes the foundations of the Arlington Mansion, established about 1670 and demolished about 1720, at Arlington Plantation, the ancestral home of the Custis family of Virginia. Some sources state that the name of the Northampton County property derived from Henry Bennet while other sources state that it was named after Arlington, Gloucestershire, the birthplace and early home of Henry Custis, the father of John Custis Sr. Archaeological investigations and excavations of the site were conducted in 1987-1988 and 1994.

The former Arlington Mansion lent its name to the Arlington House in Arlington, Virginia.

It was listed on the National Register of Historic Places in 2008.
