= George Jordan (Virginia) =

Attorney General for the Colony of Virginia
- In office 1677-1678 (acting)
- Preceded by: Robert Beverley
- Succeeded by: William Sherwood
- In office October 12, 1670 – at least October 3, 1672
- Preceded by: Peter Jenings
- Succeeded by: Robert Beverley

Member of the House of Burgesses for Surry County, Colony of Virginia
- In office 1674-1676 Serving with Lawrence Baker
- Preceded by: William Browne
- Succeeded by: Robert Canfield
- In office 1658-1659 Serving with William Cawfield
- Preceded by: William Butler
- Succeeded by: William Browne

Member of the House of Burgesses for James City County, Colony of Virginia
- In office 1646-1648 Serving with William Barrett, Walter Chiles, Ambrose Harmer, Thomas Lovinge, Robert Shepheard, William Davis, Bridges Freeman, Robert Hutchinson, Peter Ridley
- Preceded by: Thomas Swann
- Succeeded by: George Read
- In office 1644 Serving with Richard Brewster, Robert Hutchinson, Thomas Loven, John Shepard, Edward Travers, Thomas Warren, Stephen Webb
- Preceded by: John Fludd
- Succeeded by: George Stephens

Personal details
- Born: circa 1620 Surrey, England
- Died: 1679 Surry County Colony of Virginia
- Resting place: Four Mile Tree plantation, Surry County, Virginia
- Spouse(s): Alyce Jordan, Elizabeth Coats
- Children: Fortune Jordan Hunt
- Relatives: Arthur Jordan
- Occupation: attorney, planter, politician

George Jordan (1620-1679) was an English attorney who also became a planter and politician in the Colony of Virginia. He twice served as the colony's attorney general (before and after Bacon's Rebellion) and at various times represented James City County (before the creation of Surry County for land on the south bank of the James River) and Surry County in the House of Burgesses, and may have served on the Virginia Governor's Council.

== Early and family life ==
Jordan was born in Surrey, England. He had a younger brother Arthur Jordan (1628-1698), who also emigrated to the Virginia colony, and whose descendants would carry on the family name, including with a son (this man's grandson), whom contemporaries sometimes called George Jordan Jr. Their sister named Fortune (in honor of whom this man named his daughter), also emigrated and became the second wife of Col. John Flood, and after his death renounced all her widow's rights and married James Mills, a Surry county merchant.

At Jamestown in 1635, Jordan married Alyce Myles, daughter of John Myles who had immigrated from Hereford, England. She had died by 1655, when Jordan married Elizabeth Coats. In his will, Jordan specifically mourns their daughter, Fortune Jordan, who married Thomas Hunt of Jamestown, to whom Jordan sold a 400-acre plantation in Surry County. However, both son-in-law and daughter had died by 1671, and Jordan administered the estates of the parents for the child.

Complicating matters, two other men with the surname Jordan also emigrated early to the Virginia colony, settled nearby on the south side of the James River and served in the House of Burgesses, as would this man. However, he does not appear related to either the "ancient Planter" Samuel Jordan who settled about 25 miles upstream in what was then Charles City County (but became Prince George County and for whom Jordan Point, Virginia is named), nor the soldier Thomas Jordan who immigrated circa 1623, later claimed headrights for 18 additional immigrants and served as a burgess for Warrosqueake in 1629 and whose descendants settled in that downstream portion of Surry County that became Isle of Wight County. Nor does this man appear related to the probable Quaker Thomas Jordan who moved from Isle of Wight to Nansemond County. However, this man's will named his nephew Thomas Jordan as heir to half of his estate, as well as executor, so he clearly had a relative of that name, another of Arthur's sons.

== Career ==
The future Col. George Jordan emigrated to Virginia in 1637, and was named as a headright by Capt.Henry Browne, who had immigrated to Virginia three years earlier, had a seat on the Governor's Council, and in whose family graveyard at Four Mile Tree plantation this man would be buried. In any event, during his decades in Virginia Jordan accumulated significant landholdings, by patents for persons whose emigration he paid, including his first wife, variously known as Ann or Alyce. In 1675, Jordan was one of the wealthiest men in Surry County, paying taxes on seven tithable servants, none of whom was Black, unlike the other wealthy men, Col. Thomas Swann, Major William Browne, Francis Mason, Arthur Allen and Cpt. Lawrence Baker.

Jordan was first elected as one of the burgesses representing James City County in the House of Burgesses in 1644, and while he was not-re-elected the following year, he was again elected in 1646, and was one of two men re-elected the following year. Upon the creation of Surry County from land in James City County south of the James River in 1652, Jordan became one of the justices of the peace who jointly administered the new county. In 1658-59 he was elected as one of the burgesses representing Surry county, but only for the 1659 session, and again around the time of Bacon's Rebellion discussed below.

Accounts differ as to whether Jordan had been formally appointed to the Virginia Governor's Council in 1670, or whether he attended meetings ex officio because of his positions at attorney general and deputy escheator. Members of the Governor's Council could not serve as burgesses, and Jordan was a burgess in 1674-76, just before and during Bacon's Rebellion. During the actual conflict in late 1676, Jordan served as Lt. Col. for the Surry County militia under Col. (and councillor) Thomas Swann and garrisoned a fort in Surry County's Southwark parish which was not the site of actual fighting.

Following the conflict, the commissioners investigating the rebellion (Herbert Jeffreys, John Berry and Francis Moryson) on May 1, 1677 requested Jordan and fellow burgess Major Theophilius Hone (whose house was destroyed in the Jamestown arson by Bacon's followers) prepare a report about loss of goods and cattle in James City, New Kent and York Counties, which survives but reportedly is extremely difficult to read. Jordan also specifically cleared and requested a pardon for Mrs. Sarah Grindon, the wife of Thomas Grindon, who had been charged as an insurgent. Jordan prepared a list of men whose estates had been escheated to the crown, including signed a document about disposition of the estate of Richard Lawrence, one of Bacon's ardent supporters and a Jamestown resident who was executed for his participation.

== Death and legacy ==
Jordan died in late 1678. His fellow burgess Lt.Col. William Browne and William Thompson testified thathis May 1678 will was authentic, and it was admitted to probate in November. It directed that he be buried beside his wife and children in the Four Mile Tree plantation orchard, and made several charitable bequests (the most unusual of which provided that a sermon on mortality be preached at his house on October 15, the anniversary of the death of his daughter), as well as bequests to descendants of his brother and sister.
