= William Browne (burgess) =

Member of the House of Burgesses for Surry County, Colony of Virginia
- In office Nov. 1682 Serving with Arthur Allen II
- Preceded by: Samuel Swann
- Succeeded by: Samuel Swann
- In office 1677-1680 Serving with Benjamin Harrison, Samuel Swann, Thomas Swann Jr.
- Preceded by: Robert Canfield
- Succeeded by: Samuel Swann
- In office 1671-1673 Serving with William Cockerham
- Preceded by: Thomas Warren
- Succeeded by: George Jordan
- In office 1660-1662 Serving with William Cawfield, Lawrence Baker, William Cockerham
- Preceded by: Thomas Warren
- Succeeded by: Thomas Warren

Personal details
- Born: circa 1630 Surrey, England
- Died: July 3, 1705 Surry County Colony of Virginia
- Resting place: Four Mile Tree plantation, Surry County, Virginia
- Relatives: Capt. Henry Browne (father-in-law)
- Occupation: planter, politician

William Browne (circa 1630-July 3, 1705) emigrated from Surrey, England to become a major planter and politician in the Colony of Virginia. He lived on the south bank of the James River at now-historic Four Mile Tree plantation, named for its distance from Jamestown and which in his tenure became part of Surry County. While his lawyer son, also William Browne, held only county offices, his grandson, also William Browne (d. 1786), would become a patriot in the American Revolutionary War, and serve in the Virginia House of Delegates.

== Early and family life ==
His father in law Capt. Henry Browne emigrated from England in 1634 and sat on the Virginia Governor's Council for nearly three decades. By 1637 Capt. Brown acquired a 2,250-acre plantation known as Pipsico, before adding another tract that became known as Four Mile Tree. Capt. Henry Brown also paid for the passage of George Jordan, who remained a family friend and who occasionally served alongside this man.

Browne married Mary Browne (1638-1681), who bore three daughters and a son, William Browne Jr. (1671-1746), who married Jane Meriwether, and had a son to carry on the family's name. This man's eldest daughter Ann (1656-1725) married Walter Flood Sr. Their daughter Mary Ann (1657-1735) married William Swann (or Spencer), and after his and her twin sister Jane's death, the widower, Thomas Jordan (who may have been the heir of Col. George Jordan, whose children predeceased him).

== Career ==
Browne inherited the Four Mile Tree plantation from his father-in-law, and farmed it using enslaved labor. He also acquired land in James City County across the James River, as well as patented land in Isle of Wight County, and in the Northern Neck of Virginia.

Browne became a justice of the peace in Surry County in 1668, a position he held until his death (and became the presiding justice in 1787, the justices jointly administering counties in this era) in 1687. He became major in the county militia in 1672, and served as its lieutenant colonel in 1679 and 1687. Meanwhile, in 1677, Browne signed a petition challenging the James City County government. Browne also served as the Surry county sheriff in 1674 and 1687.

Browne was first elected as one of Surry County's representatives in the House of Burgesses in 1660 and re-elected several times, although he also lost some bids for re-election. In November 1682, he requested 2.5 years of rent for a Jamestown row house which the General Court used as an office. On April 7, 1785, Browne and his second wife sold George Lee their 3/4 acre lot in Jamestown, which contained some row houses and which had formerly belonged to Thomas Woodhurst, and which had been damaged when Bacon's supporters set the capital city afire in 1676. Brown also received rent from the colony's government in 1691, 1692 and 1694 for providing a storehouse for ammunition belonging to the Jamestown fort.

== Death and legacy ==
Browne died on July 3, 1705. The will which he had executed on December 4, 1704, left his property (including some in either Jamestown or James City County) to his grandson, also Henry Brown (d. 1735).
