= Claremont, Virginia =

- Town
- Seal

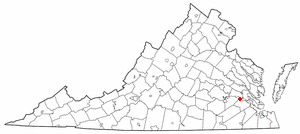
- Location of Claremont, Virginia
- Coordinates: 37°13′38″N 76°57′56″W
- Country: United States
- State: Virginia
- County: Surry

Area
  - Total: 2.54 sq mi (6.58 km^{2})
  - Land: 2.54 sq mi (6.58 km^{2})
  - Water: 0 sq mi (0.00 km^{2})
- Elevation: 125 ft (38 m)

Population (2020)
  - Total: 305
  - Estimate (2019): 336
  - Density: 132.3/sq mi (51.09/km^{2})
- Time zone: UTC-5 (Eastern (EST))
  - Summer (DST): UTC-4 (EDT)
- ZIP code: 23899
- Area codes: 757, 948
- FIPS code: 51-16880
- GNIS feature ID: 1464932
- Website: https://claremontva.gov/

Claremont is an incorporated town in Surry County, Virginia, United States. As of the 2020 census, Claremont had a population of 305. A granite marker is a memorial to British settlers' arrival in the area. It received its name during the colonial era from the royal residence in Surry Shire in England. The town was incorporated in 1886, had a port on the James River, and gained railroad service as a terminus for a while before being abandoned. Claremont was home to the Temperance, Industrial, and Collegiate Institute, a school for African Americans founded by Ph.D. John J Smallwood, who was formerly enslaved in N.C. The area includes a historical marker commemorating the institution.

== History ==
A granite marker in a circle in the center of town commemorates the landing here on May 5, 1607, of English settlers, before the landing at Jamestown across the navigable portion of the James River. English and Scotch emigrants had settled there, near the principal native American village called Quioughcohanock (probably located on what later became known as "Wharf Bluff") by 1632. In 1649, Arthur Allen patented lands in Surry County and by 1655 built Allen's Brick House in the lower part of the county. His descendants owned this property until 1882. His son Arthur Allen II in addition to his agricultural and mercantile activities became Speaker of the House of Burgesses. By the late 17th and early 18th centuries, Claremont was a busy port town and shipped many goods, but especially hogsheads of tobacco. Colonel William Allen served in the American Revolutionary War. Speaker Allen's grandson John Allen lived at Claremont Manor House. He served in the Virginia House of Delegates and Virginia Ratifying Convention. His principal heir, Lt. Col. William Allen (1768–1831), also lived at Claremont and served many terms in the House of Delegates before the War of 1812 and supposedly became the largest land owner and slaveholder in the Commonwealth of Virginia of his day. He never married and required his great-nephew and heir, William Griffin Orgain to change his surname to Allen to inherit. That William Allen became a lumber magnate, built a railroad, and in May 1861 became a Confederate officer and captain of the Jamestown Heavy Artillery (which he financed), Rails from his railroad were re-smelted to armor the Confederate ironclad Merrimac. However, Allen resigned his military commission in 1862.

After the Civil War, Claremont became a shipping port for railroad ties cut for the Prussian government and shipped to Hamburg. Willie Allen, who inherited Claremont Manor, moved to New York and sold the property. J. Frank Mancha, a Maryland or Delaware real estate developer, began developing and subdividing the property to build a new town there in 1879. Incorporated in 1886, the town of Claremont became the eastern terminus of the new Atlantic and Danville Railway (A&D), a narrow gauge railroad, which was completed to a point near Emporia called James River Junction, where it connected with a standard gauge track towards Danville. Unfortunately for Claremont, the A&D decided to link its western leg with a new eastern terminus in West Norfolk on the harbor of Hampton Roads, and the line to Claremont, which was never standard-gauged, went into semi-abandonment. After some use for lumber transport as the Surry, Sussex and Southampton Railway, the rails were removed in the late 1930s.

In the years since the area has remained a rural enclave, but some resort use has developed along the bluffs and beaches of the James River. Many homes along the riverfront were severely damaged, and Claremont's neighboring beach, Sunken Meadow, was destroyed in 2003 by Hurricane Isabel.

In 2006, the old A&D station at Claremont Beach (village, not the wharf) was still standing.

== Geography ==
Claremont is located at 37°13′38″N 76°57′56″W (37.227291, -76.965458).

According to the United States Census Bureau, the town has a total area of 2.5 square miles (6.6 km^{2}), all land.

== Demographics ==
Historical population
| Census | Pop. | Note | %± |
|---|---|---|---|
| 1890 | 189 | | — |
| 1900 | 565 | | 198.9% |
| 1910 | 630 | | 11.5% |
| 1920 | 572 | | −9.2% |
| 1930 | 434 | | −24.1% |
| 1940 | 380 | | −12.4% |
| 1950 | 374 | | −1.6% |
| 1960 | 377 | | 0.8% |
| 1970 | 383 | | 1.6% |
| 1980 | 380 | | −0.8% |
| 1990 | 358 | | −5.8% |
| 2000 | 343 | | −4.2% |
| 2010 | 378 | | 10.2% |
| 2020 | 305 | | −19.3% |
U.S. Decennial Census

As of the census of 2000, there were 343 people, 147 households, and 99 families residing in the town. The population density was 135.3 people per square mile (52.1/km^{2}). There were 240 housing units at an average density of 94.6 per square mile (36.5/km^{2}). The racial makeup of the town was 73.18% White, 22.74% African American, 2.04% Native American, and 2.04% from two or more races.

There were 147 households, out of which 23.1% had children under the age of 18 living with them, 53.7% were married couples living together, 9.5% had a female householder with no husband present, and 32.0% were non-families. 27.9% of all households were made up of individuals, and 11.6% had someone living alone who was 65 years of age or older. The average household size was 2.33 and the average family size was 2.83.

In the town, the population was spread out, with 19.8% under the age of 18, 5.8% from 18 to 24, 25.7% from 25 to 44, 31.5% from 45 to 64, and 17.2% who were 65 years of age or older. The median age was 44 years. For every 100 females, there were 92.7 males. For every 100 females age 18 and over, there were 92.3 males.

The median income for a household in the town was $34,643, and the median income for a family was $46,667. Males had a median income of $42,250 versus $30,000 for females. The per capita income for the town was $22,741. About 6.3% of families and 7.5% of the population were below the poverty line, including none of those under age 18 and 10.2% of those age 65 or over.

== Temperance, Industrial, and Collegiate Institute ==
Dr. John Jefferson Smallwood established the Temperance, Industrial, and Collegiate Institute in Claremont on October 12, 1892, with fewer than ten students. Smallwood was born enslaved in Rich Square, North Carolina in 1863. The school's campus covered 271 acres along the James River and served boys and girls from Virginia as well as other states.

The Richmond Planet covered the opening of Lincoln Memorial Hall on its campus in 1912, a significant accomplishment for the Institute. Smallwood became severely ill in September of that same year and was taken to the Retreat for the Sick in Richmond, Virginia. He died on September 29, 1912, at the age of 49.

After Smallwood's death, a period of mergers and name changes followed. One of which was Marcus Garvey’s organization, the UNIA (Universal Negro Improvement Association) remaining the school; Liberty University (Universal Liberty University) until the school closed in 1928, it had more than 2,000 alumni. A marker commemorating the school is at 37° 9.931′ N, 76° 58.404′ W. in Spring Grove, Virginia at the intersection of Colonial Trail West (Virginia Route 10) and Martin Luther King Highway (Virginia Route 40), on the right when traveling east on Colonial Trail West. A prominent memorial to Smallwood, where he rest, can be found at the Abundant Life Church Cemetery on Cabin Point Rd. in Spring Grove.
