= Thomas Milner (politician) =

Virginia politician d. 1694

23rd Speaker of the Virginia House of Burgesses
- In office 1691–1693
- Preceded by: Arthur Allen
- Succeeded by: Philip Ludwell

Member of the House of Burgesses representing Nansemond County
- In office 1688–1693 Serving with Thomas Lear, John Brassier, Godwin
- Preceded by: John Brasseur
- Succeeded by: John Wright

Personal details
- Born: unknown England
- Died: April 27, 1694 Nansemond County, Virginia Colony, British America
- Children: Francis, Thomas Milner Jr.
- Profession: merchant, surveyor, military officer, planter, politician

Thomas Milner (died April 27, 1694), emigrated from England to the Virginia colony where he became a merchant, planter, military officer and politician who twice served as Speaker of the Virginia House of Burgesses.

== Early life ==
Although his parentage and date of birth are unknown or disputed, he is assumed to have emigrated to the Virginia colony from Yorkshire or Lincolnshire, in part because he used the same coat of arms as that Milner family.

== Career ==
Milner's name appears as a headright in a land patent in 1650, and within two decades he had become a prominent surveyor in the colony. In 1672, British merchant John Seward of Bristol named Milner as one of his attorneys in Virginia. By that time, Milner had begun his career as a planter by patenting 350 acres across from Dumpling Island in Nansemond County (based on people for whose emigration he had paid). Between 1672 and 1674, Milner acquired 3,362 acres in Nansemond and Lower Norfolk Counties, mostly in a partnership with Thomas Butt. In 1688, together with Mr. Heslete, Milner marked a boundary between Virginia and North Carolina.

Shortly before Bacon's Rebellion in 1676, Milner was a major in the Nansemond County militia and was one of three men who raised troops in that county to march against Native Americans, although many county records of that era have been lost. During the rebellion, he, like Thomas Swann of Surry County and about five dozen other burgesses, signed Bacon's oath. By 1680, Milner was Lt.Col. of the Nansemond militia.

After the rebellion, probably around 1682 when clerk Robert Beverley was imprisoned, Milner was elected as clerk by the House of Burgesses and confirmed by the Governor and Council, although in early 1682 Governor Culpeper had claimed that only he had authority to appoint the clerk for the House of Burgesses. His signature, along with that of William Sherwood, appear on several grievances sent by burgesses to the King and Council of State in England in 1684.

Milner was clerk of the Virginia General Assembly in 1684 and possibly as early as 1682, but disagreement exists as to whether he served as burgess for Nansemond County in 1682. Clearly, Milner lost the election for clerk of the House of Burgesses to Beverley in 1685. Also undisputed is that Nansemond County voters elected Milner to represent them as a burgess in 1688, and re-elected him several times before his death. Upon his election as burgess in 1688, Milner was soom appointed as chairman of two important committees, that for examination of election returns and for propositions and grievances. When Speaker Allen left the chair during an important debate about whether to assist the New York colony in defending itself against the French (which was ultimately rejected), Milner was elected chairman of the committee of the whole House for that debate. He also supported Speaker Allen and other burgesses in opposing Governor Effingham's policies. When Speaker Allen refused to swear allegiance to WIlliam and Mary after the Glorious Revolution, fellow burgesses elected Milner as their Speaker without opposition for the 1691–1692 session. Effingham's successor, Gov. Francis Nicholson seemed to have a better relationship with Milner and the burgesses, for both sessions passed considerable legislation. Thus, Nicholson suggested that Milner receive a post as customs collector, and Rev. James Blair arranged for Milner's appointment as trustee of the newly formed College of William and Mary. The burgesses re-elected Milner speaker in both 1693 sessions, but he and the burgesses came into conflict with the newly appointed governor Sir Edmund Andros.

== Personal life ==
Coat of Arms of Thomas Milner

Milner had two sons who also served as burgesses for Nansemond County after his death, Thomas Milner Jr. and Francis Milner. His relation to George Milner who served as an officer under Bacon during Bacon's Rebellion and preserved his own life when surrendering the West Point garrison on January 16, 1677, is unknown. Likewise unknown is this man's relationship with John Milner who sided with Bacon and was exempted from the general pardon, and became a trader with Native Americans in Henrico County and associated with William Byrd I. Those George and John Milner may instead have been associated with Robert Milner who sailed to Virginia in 1620 and established residence in Charles City County on the other side of Williamsburg and Jamestown from Nansemond County. This man's son Thomas Milner Jr. married into the Cary family of Virginia and his grandson of the same name married into the Selden family of Virginia, else genealogists who worked several decades ago believe the male Milner line in Virginia ended with the death of Samuel Milner in 1788. This man's daughter (Thomas Jr.'s sister) Mary Milner (1667–1700) married Col. Miles Cary (b. 1665) who became a burgess representing Warwick County, but none of their children survived (his issue were with his second wife Mary Wilson Rowscow). His son Francis' daughter Anne married Major Thomas Cary (b. 1647) of Windmill Point plantation in Warwick County.

== Death and legacy ==
Milner died on April 27, 1694. He is among the names on a memorial tablet in WIlliamsburg near the former Eastern State Hospital.
