= Sarah Drummond =

Early Virginia landholder (died before 1696)

Sarah Drummond was a member of Bacon's Rebellion, one of the first landowning women in America, and the wife of William Drummond, the first colonial governor of Albemarle Sound settlement, Province of Carolina.

== Early life ==
There is little known about Sarah Drummond's early life. There is no surviving record of her birth date, birth name, parents or place of birth. In 1662, Sarah received a patent for a 0.5 acres (0.20 ha) lot that was "bequeathed" by an Edward Prescott. It is unknown if she was related or married to Prescott. In the early 1650s, Sarah Drummond married William Drummond, who was the first colonial governor of Albemarle Sound settlement in the Provence of Carolina. Together, they had at least five children, "two boys, two girls, and at least one other child". Drummond and her family lived on the "Governer's land in James City County", which was 25 acres of land leased to her husband William Drummond by Sir William Berkeley in 1648. Despite the land lease, Berkeley and the Drummonds often clashed in opinions and had animosity between them. "It is unknown whether personal animosity or differences about public policy led Drummond to support Nathaniel Bacon in opposition to Berkeley during the rebellion of 1676."

== Involvement in Bacon's Rebellion ==
Sarah Drummond and her husband were important members of Bacon's Rebellion in 1676. Drummond was "an important member of the leadership" of Bacon's Rebellion, being an outspoken woman and being essentially a landowner, she held incredible influence in the colonies. Sarah Drummond participated in the rebellion by spreading the word to other households and publicly questioning the authority of William Berkeley. Many of the people who joined Bacon's Rebellion were indentured servants, slaves, and women, as Bacon promised them freedom for their service to his cause. Women, on the other hand, joined as they were threatened by the patriarchal control that Berkeley had over Virginia. One instance where Sarah was informed that Britain might send the army to Virginia to put down the rebellion, she picked up a twig or straw and cried: "I value the power of England no more than that". When Bacon's Army burned through Jamestown in autumn of 1676, The Drummond's expressed their support for the cause by burning down their own house. Drummond and her husband remained loyal to Bacon until the end. When Nathaniel Bacon died in October, the Drummonds continued to "fight back on the governor's forces for another two and a half months." The rebellion finally ended once Drummond's husband was captured in Chicahomony Swamp.

== Land dispute ==
On January 20, 1677, five days after his capture, William Drummond was presented to William Berkeley, and was greeted with sarcasm: "Mr. Drummond! you are very welcome, I am more Glad to See you, than any man in Virginia, Mr. Drummond you shall be hang'd in half an hour." After her husband was hung for his involvement in Bacon's Rebellion, their land was seized by the Governor of Virginia, William Berkeley. The Drummond's "crops and other goods were seized" by Frances Culpeper Berkeley, Berkeley's wife. After the seizure of her husband's property and their luxuries, Sarah Drummond was determined to get back her husband's land and clear his name.

In 1677, she sailed to England to lobby her cause. In England, Drummond wrote "The Humble Petition of Sarah Drummond", in which Drummond argues that her husband was not provided a proper trial having been denied a jury, and thus was wrongly executed. Drummond "petitioned the Committee for Trade and Plantations to have her property restored". Although the followers of Berkeley believed that William Drummond was given a fair trial as the land belonged to Berkeley and not William Drummond, Sarah Drummond garnered support through her claims that the seizure of her husbands property had left she and her children starving and desolate in the woods, as she states: "and forced Your petitioner, with her five poor Children, to fly from their habitation, and wander in the Deserts and Woods, till they were ready to starve". Drummond's words spread throughout England and eventually reached King Charles II. The Committee for Trade and Plantations requested that the property should be handed back over to Drummond, and on October 22, 1677, The king gave the order, reinstating the plantation to Sarah Drummond.

Upon returning to America, Drummond filed a lawsuit against Frances Berkeley to regain her property. The hearing began in June 1678, and was a controversial event in Jamestown, as many of Berkeley's followers still believed that the property was rightfully owned by Berkeley. "Drummond's son in law, Samuel Swann, acted as her attorney, and they eventually obtained a verdict in her favor."

== Death ==
Sarah Drummond gave power of attorney to one of her son's to regain her property on October 10, 1679, and her name last appears on a public record, leasing land in 1683. Sarah Drummond's date of death was not recorded, however, it is believed that she died and was buried on Samuel Swann's plantation, before the 28th of April, 1696.

Sarah Drummond's writings have gone down in history, providing context to Sir William Berkeley's actions "before and after the rebellion" to historians.
