= William Allen (burgess, 1758–1761) =

Member of the Virginia House of Burgesses representing Surry County
- In office 1758–1761 Serving with Hartwell Cocke, William Clinch
- Preceded by: Benjamin Cocke
- Succeeded by: Henry Browne

Personal details
- Born: 1734 Upper Chippokes plantation, Surry County, Colony of Virginia
- Died: 1793 (aged 58–59) Claremont plantation, Surry County, Virginia
- Spouse(s): Clara Walker; Mary Lightfoot
- Children: John, William
- Education: College of William and Mary
- Profession: Planter, officer, politician

William Allen (1734-1793), was a planter and patriot in the Colony of Virginia, who represented Surry County in the House of Burgesses (1758-1761). He shared the same name as a burgess in 1629 who was probably not related, as well as several later members of the Virginia General Assembly, including one of his sons.

== Early life and education ==
Born among the First Families of Virginia, this son of Joseph Allen and grandson of Arthur Allen was educated across the James River at the College of William & Mary. He had an uncle John Allen (1684-1742), Arthur Allen's eldest son who served as a burgess from 1736 until 1740, after becoming a very wealthy planter and tobacco warehouse owner and holding various local civil and military offices. Burgess John Allen (whom burgess William Byrd II nicknamed "Capricorn") outlived his brothers and all his children died young, but at his death owned more than 24,000 acres in Isle of Wight, Nansemond and Surry Counties, as well as 200 enslaved people. However he died when this boy was only eight, and the executor of will, James Baker (who moved to Isle of Wight county by 1753), heeded instructions to pay for this nephew's education, as well as maintained the bequeathed property in northwestern Surry County, on which this man later built now-historic Claremont Manor.

== Career ==
Upon reaching legal age in 1755, this William Allen continued the family traditions of farming using enslaved labor, as well as holding various governmental offices. When the House of Burgesses invalidated the election of William Clinch because he had been expelled from the legislature in 1757, Surry county voters instead of re-electing Clinch's successor of that year, Benjamin Cocke, instead elected this young man to represent them alongside Hartwell Cocke (who would be elected many times) However, Allen only served one term (1758 until 1761), replaced in the next election by fellow planter Henry Browne (who also would only serve one term). Allen also held local offices, including vestryman in his parish, and rose to become colonel of the Surry County militia during the American Revolutionary War.

== Personal life ==
This William Allen married twice. His first wife was Clara Walker, who bore a son, John Allen (1756-1793), who served in the Virginia House of Delegates and the Virginia Ratifying Convention of 1788, but never married and died shortly before this man, his father, to whom he left his ten slaves and other property. Years earlier, this man had remarried, to Mary Lightfoot, the daughter of William Lightfoot of 'Sandy Point' plantation in upriver Charles City County. They had daughters and another son, also William Allen (1768-1831), who like his father, half-brother and many others in the family also served in the Virginia legislature as well as operated his inherited plantations using enslaved labor.

== Death and legacy ==
William Allen barely survived his unmarried firstborn son, so most of his property was inherited by his son of the same name. Before his death That William Allen like his great uncle John had greatly expanded his patrimony, but had no children who survived, and so bequeathed that property to William Griffith Orgain (the grandson of his sister Ann), upon the condition that he change his surname to Allen. Claremont Manor survives in private hands. The surrounding area was developed by a northern entrepreneur decades after the American Civil War, but it is hundreds of miles from the historic district of the same name in Arlington, Virginia.
