= Sarah Drummond (disambiguation) =

Sarah Drummond was a prominent member of Bacon's Rebellion.

Sarah Drummond may also refer to:

- Sarah Drummond, character in Borat 2
- Sarah Drummond (Torchwood), fictional character
- Sarah Drummond, fictional character in Wagon Train played by June Lockhart
- Sarah Drummond, fictional character in All Families Are Psychotic
- Sarah Drummond, fictional character in Season of Fear
