= Arthur Allen II =

Virginia politician d. 1710

Major Arthur Allen

22nd Speaker of the Virginia House of Burgesses
- In office 1679
- Preceded by: William Kendall
- Succeeded by: Thomas Milner

Member of the House of Burgesses representing Surry County
- In office 1684-1690 Serving with Samuel Swann
- Preceded by: Benjamin Harrison
- Succeeded by: Benjamin Harrison
- In office 1680-1682 Serving with Samuel Swann
- Preceded by: Thomas Swann Jr.
- Succeeded by: Benjamin Harrison

Personal details
- Born: ca. 1652 Surry County
- Died: 1710 Surry County, Virginia Colony, British America
- Parent(s): Arthur Allen Sr., Alice Tucker
- Profession: merchant, planter, politician

Arthur Allen II, also known as Major Allen (born ca. 1652, died June 15, 1710) was a Virginia colonial planter, merchant, military officer and controversial politician who twice served as Speaker of the Virginia House of Burgesses. He supported Governor William Berkeley during Bacon's Rebellion and became a prominent member of the Green Spring faction opposing later royal governors.

== Early life and education ==
Allen was born to merchant Arthur Allen and his second wife, the former Alice Tucker, around 1652. His father had patented 200 acres between Lawnes Creek and Lower Chippoakes Creek in 1649, and by 1665 built a 3-story brick home for his family in what became Surry County, Virginia. Arthur Allen Jr. had an elder half brother, Humphrey Allen, born in England and who died in Virginia around 1666, and four sisters. He received a private education appropriate to his class, including in England, and was certified as a surveyor.

== Personal life ==
Allen married the heiress daughter of Capt. Lawrence Baker, Katherine Baker, with whom he had eight children. His eldest son, John Allen (1684-1742) not only outlived his siblings, but increased his landholdings to more than 24,000 acres in Isle of Wight, Nansemond and Surry Counties (including the area that became Brunswick County in 1720), in part through an advantageous marriage to Elizabeth Bassett, the daughter of Councillor (and major landowner) William Bassett. John Allen represented Surry County in the House of Burgesses (1736-1740). His sister Elizabeth married Col. William Bridges. Other siblings were Katherine, James (who never married), Arthur (who married Elizabeth Bray), Ann, Mary and Joseph. Joseph's son William Allen (1734-1796) was educated at the College of William and Mary at his uncle's expense and became his principal heir. This William Allen or his son constructed Claremont manor house. William's son by his second wife, John Allen would serve in the Virginia House of Delegates and in the Virginia Ratification Convention. The last of the direct line was Lt.Col. William Allen (1768-1831), who never married but served many terms in the House of Delegates before the War of 1812 and supposedly became the largest land owner and slave owner in the Commonwealth of Virginia of his day. He required his great-nephew and heir, William Griffin Orgain to change his surname to Allen in order to inherit. That man supposedly became the wealthiest Virginian of his day, as well as a lumber and railroad magnate before enlisting in the Confederate cause in May 1861 and financing the Jamestown Heavy Artillery.

== Planter ==
After his father died in 1669, as the only surviving son, Allen inherited his father's estate, which included the Allen Brick House (now known as Bacon's Castle), although he was unable to fully claim his inheritance until he reached the legal age of 21 (his mother administering his inheritance until her remarriage to widower John Hardy of neighboring Isle of Wight County). Allen also inherited acreage on Upper Chippokes Creek and the Blackwater River. He would increase his landholdings in his lifetime, until he owned almost 1000 acres in Surry and Isle of Wight Counties by the time of his death. Both counties appointed him their official surveyor. During his lifetime, Allen decreased his use of indentured labor and increased the use of enslaved labor on his plantations.

== Political career ==
Upon reaching legal age, Allen followed his father's public career path and began serving on the Lawnes Creek Parish vestry. He also served with the Surry County militia, and attained the rank of Captain in 1677 and Major at some point between the fall of 1680 and the spring of the following year.

An ally of Governor Sir William Berkeley. Allen was appointed a justice of the peace for Surry County in 1675, a year before the start of Bacon's Rebellion. Because of his close association with Berkeley, Allen was appointed to the quorum of the Surry County court in May 1677. When the Surry Court noted to send provisions to the rebels, Allen dissented.

Allen was fighting alongside Governor Berkeley in Jamestown when his brother-in-law Arthur Long (husband of his sister Mary), along with William Rookings and about 70 other followers of Nathaniel Bacon, seized Allen's home across the river in Surry County. Allen also led Berkeley's forces in an unsuccessful sortie against the rebels days before they burned Jamestown. While Allen was able to reclaim his home about four months later, after Bacon died of disease and Berkeley's and royal forces crushed the rebellion, Bacon's followers had caused massive damages to the property, in addition to plundering silver, linen, books and cattle. Ironically given the property's later name, Bacon actually never visited the site. The royal commissioners investigating the rebellion later estimated Allen's losses as at least 1000 pounds sterling. Meanwhile, Allen lost his public offices for about a year, suspended during the investigation by the new Lieutenant Governor, Herbert Jeffreys, but regained some after Jeffreys died in 1678.

Beginning in 1680 Surry County voters elected and re-elected Allen and fellow planter Samuel Swann (son of Thomas Swann, a member of the Governor's Council) as their representatives in the Virginia House of Burgesses, except during the November 1682 session when they elected instead planters Benjamin Harrison and William Browne. Considered to be a man of influence and affiliated with the Green Spring faction led by Berkeley's widow and several members of the Virginia Governor's Council, fellow burgesses twice elected Allen as their Speaker (in 1686 and 1688). Allen joined with Robert Beverley and Philip Ludwell Sr. (leaders of the Green Spring faction) in opposing efforts of the next governor, Thomas Culpeper, to punish rioters who again cut growing tobacco before harvest as they attempted to raise the price (which had fallen spectacularly since the 1660s, as Ludwell Sr. had acknowledged in 1662).

However, the next royally appointed Governor, Francis Howard, with the support of the royal government in London, continued attempts to limit the assembly's influence. In addition to removing Allen from the Surry County court in 1686 for objecting to the governor's choice for county sheriff and from his posts as surveyor in 1688, twice Governor Howard dissolved the Virginia General Assembly. Allen had become a leader in opposing Governor Howard in both his terns as speaker, first in 1686 following the death of William Kendall (the Burgesses later awarding him 10,000 pounds of tobacco for his services), and then in 1688 (during which he forwarded a 12-item censure of Howard's actions to the King). In 1689, when Philip Ludwell Sr. was named governor of North Carolina by that colony's proprietors, Allen accompanied him and made surveys.

In the 1691 assembly Allen and fellow burgess-elect James Bray refused to take the newly rewritten oath of allegiance and supremacy which recognized the ascent of William III and Mary II following the Glorious Revolution. Allen cited "Scruple of Conscience" and his oath of allegiance to the former James II, and so was not seated, and also could not hold any office in Virginia for what turned out to be 14 years. Thus, a new election was held in Surry County, and voters elected Benjamin Harrison to replace Allen. Allen also refused an order of the Surry County court to subscribe to the oath in 1697, and in that year the General Assembly questioned the validity of surveys he might make, also citing his refusal to take the oath. Allen finally subscribed to the oath in the spring of 1702 (after James II had died in exile), and was soon thereafter sworn in as one of the board of visitors governing the College of William and Mary.

Allen also returned to the Surry County Court (as its senior member) in the fall of 1702, after swearing allegiance to Queen Anne. The following year, Allen again sought election to the House of Burgesses, but was not among the top two candidates. Out of anger Allen ordered the local sheriff not to confirm the election of Thomas Swann Jr. (brother to his former co-burgess Samuel Swann and who managed that family's remaining Virginia property), claiming that Governor Nicholson approved of this action. However, the burgesses considered this as showing disrespect for the House of Burgesses, prompting an investigation and Allen's public apology. In April 1703, Governor Nicholson appointed Allen naval officer for the Upper District of the James River, a lucrative post collecting tobacco taxes, and which he held through his death. Allen also was again named surveyor for Surry and Isle of Wight Counties, only resigning that position in favor of his son John in 1707.

Although acting governor Edmund Jenings recommended Allen to the Board of Trade for appointment to the Virginia Governor's Council, he did not receive that highest position in the colony, perhaps because of a falling-out with his former ally Philip Ludwell Jr., who referred to Allen as a "meddlesome old fool" and criticized his conduct as naval officer.

== Death and legacy ==
Allen drafted his last will and testament on February 16, 1710, and died on June 15, 1710. His estate (admitted to probate later that year) included over a thousand acres of real estate, as well as other property valued at 838 pounds sterling, and 28 slaves valued at more than 682 pounds sterling. His third son, Arthur Allen III (1689-1727) inherited the Allen Brick House. The Allen Brick house now known as Bacon's Castle, was placed on the National Register of Historic Places as one of the oldest houses in Virginia. It is now operated with the assistance of Preservation Virginia.
