= Governor Drummond =

Governor Drummond may refer to:

- Gordon Drummond (1772–1854), Governor General of the Canadas from 1815 to 1816
- William Drummond (colonial governor) (died 1677), 1st Colonial Governor of Albemarle Sound settlement in the Province of Carolina
