= Lawrence Baker (burgess) =

Planter and politician in the Colony of Virginia

Member of the Virginia House of Burgesses for Surry County, Colony of Virginia
- In office 1666–1676 Serving with William Browne, George Jordan, Thomas Warren
- Preceded by: William Cockerham
- Succeeded by: Francis Mason

Personal details
- Born: England
- Died: 1681 Nansemond County, Virginia
- Spouse: Elizabeth
- Children: Katherine
- Relatives: Arthur Allen II (son-in-law)
- Occupation: Planter, politician

Lawrence Baker (ca.1620–1681) was a planter and politician in the Colony of Virginia who immigrated from England and represented Surry County in the House of Burgesses (1666–1676). He is best known for suppressing America's first tax strike, a predecessor to Bacon's Rebellion.

== Virginia career ==
By May 1643, Baker and James Taylor patented 500 acres at the confluence of Lawne's Creek and the James River (in what was then James City County and became Surry County in 1652), which acreage they re-patented in 1650. Baker also patented 2,050 acres of land in Surry County in 1667. Baker had a brother James Baker, who also emigrated to the Virginia colony, and attested to Baker's signature on a legal document.

After burgess William Cockerham retired in 1665, Surry County voters elected Baker as his successor, and he served the remainder of what later became known as the "Grand Assembly of 1661-1676". In 1671, the General Court ordered Baker to audit some accounts. The Grand Assembly ended with Bacon's Rebellion.

Meanwhile, Baker was one of the men named as justices of the peace when Surry county was initially formed, and who jointly administered the county in that era. Baker was still a justice of the peace on December 12, 1672, when a number of men gathered on the "Devil's Field" by the Lawne Creek church (overlooking Hogg's Island) and protested high taxes. On January 3, 1673–74, Baker and fellow justice Robert Spencer issued a writ (some call the document a warrant) about the unlawful assembly, which was officially recorded in the county records on January 13, 1673. Robert Spencer was the brother of Nicholas Spencer of Westmoreland County, about whom Bacon's followers complained. In any event, during the intervening ten days, nine men who participated in the unauthorized assembly and apologized (and were not considered instigators) were ordered to pay court costs and give bond for future good behavior. John Barnes, John Sheppard, William Hancock and Roger Delke were each ordered committed to jail until he paid 1000 pounds of tobacco as a fine. As ringleader, Mathew Swann was held for his case to be adjudicated by the General Court (which met during the Virginia General Assembly as its upper body). He was convicted on April 6, 1674, but had his 2000 pounds of tobacco fine remitted by Governor Berkeley on September 23, 1674, shortly before Berkeley sailed back to England.

== Death and legacy ==
Baker died in 1681, survived by his widow Elizabeth and his daughter Katherine, who had married major planter and burgess Arthur Allen II.
