= John Swann (politician) =

American politician

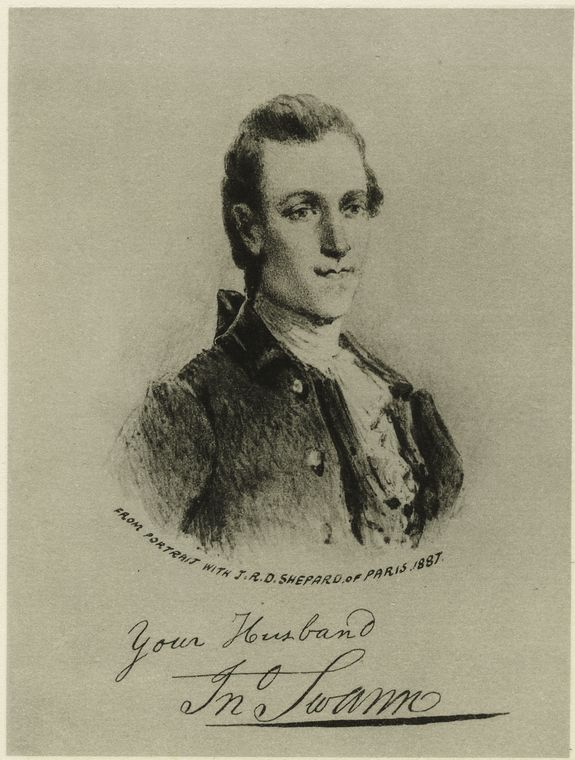
John Swann

John Swann (1760–1793) was an American planter and statesman from Pasquotank County, North Carolina. He served as a delegate for North Carolina to the Continental Congress in 1788.

== Biography ==
Swann was born on the family's plantation, known as The Elms in Pasquotank County of North Carolina. His family had been resident in the colony since Major Samuel Swann had come from Virginia before 1707 and served as speaker of the colonial assembly. His father (also John) was a local justice of the peace and served in the Governor's Council for the colony. After attending the College of William and Mary in Virginia, John returned to take up operation of their plantation.

In 1788 Swann was made a delegate to the Continental Congress after John Baptista Ashe resigned. He died at home and was buried in the family cemetery on his plantation.
