= Swann's Point Plantation Site =

Archaeological site and former plantation in Virginia, USA

- U.S. National Register of Historic Places
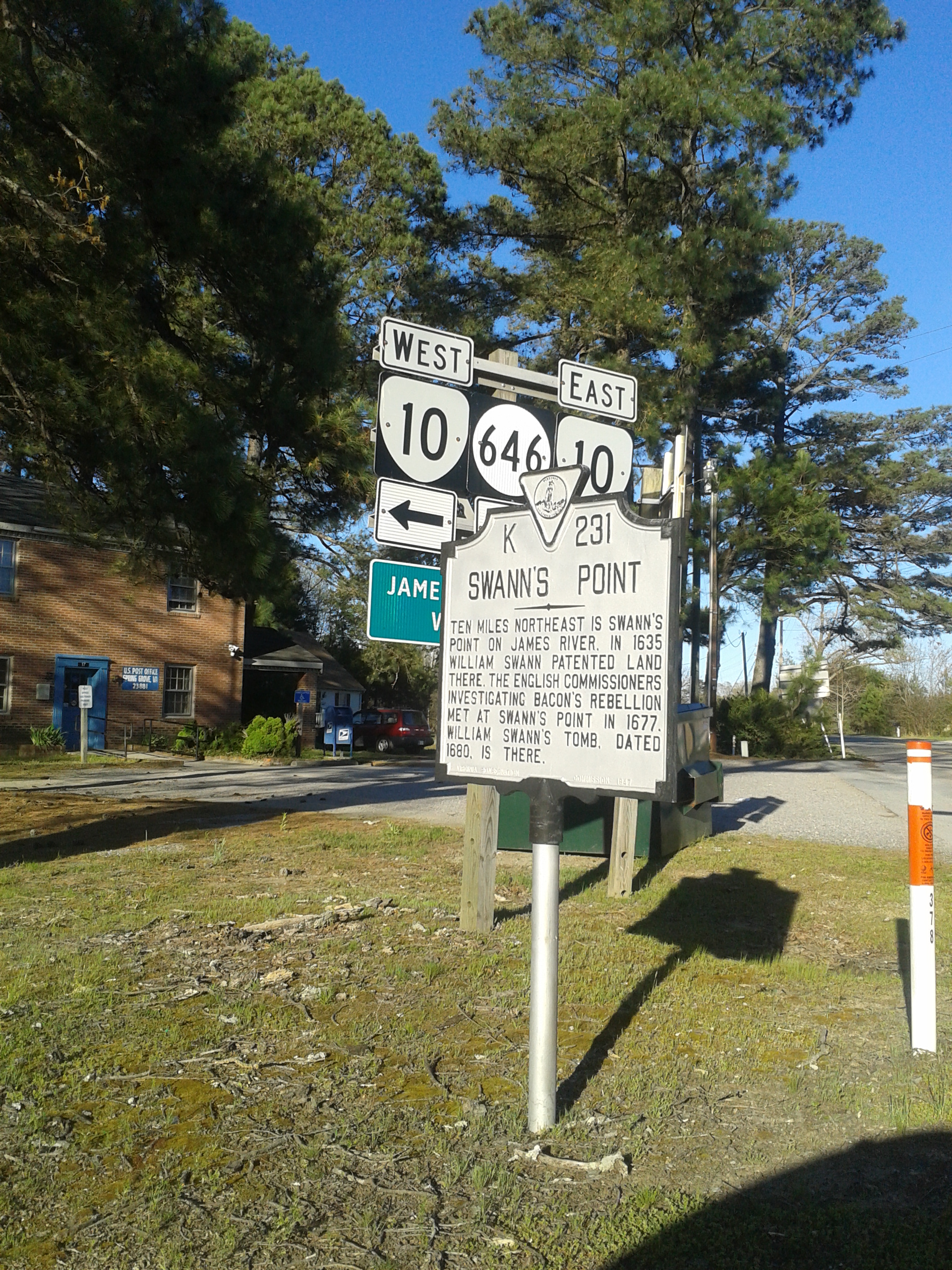
- Historic marker detailing the history of the site, seen in April 2017; the marker is several miles distant from the actual plantation location.

- Location within Virginia Location within the United States
- Nearest city: Scotland, Virginia
- Coordinates: 37.1970926°N 76.8191271°W
- Area: 67 acres (27 ha)
- Built by: Hugate, James
- NRHP reference No.: 75002040
- Added to NRHP: April 1, 1975

The Swann's Point Plantation Site is an archaeological site near the James River in Surry County, Virginia. The Swann's Point area, located west of the mouth of Gray Creek, has a rich historic of precolonial Native American occupation, as well as significant early colonial settlements. It was first granted to Richard Pace, whose warning famously saved the Jamestown Colony during the Indian massacre of 1622. The Paces abandoned their settlement in 1624.

Jamestown colonists traded at the tip of Swann's Point with the Native American. While Francis Chapman owned land there soon after the colony's establishment, by 1628 it was known as "Perryes Point" because occupied by "William Perry, Gent", Chapman's father-in-law and a member of the Governor's Council. In 1635, British emigrant and tax collector William Swann acquired a land patent for 1200 acres at Swann's Point. The plantation increased to 1650 acres by patents to his son Col. Thomas Swann in 1638 and 1655.

After Bacon's Rebellion (1676) the King's Commissioners sent to Virginia to investigate the "troubles" held their proceedings at Swann's Point. It was here, then, that petitions were heard complaining of excesses during the rebellion's suppression, including by William Hartwell, captain of Governor Berkeley's guard. Samuel Swann inherited the property from his father, and represented the area in the House of Burgesses several times, but ultimately moved to North Carolina. By 1692, a ferry based here crossed the James River to Jamestown, since Samuel Swann's half-brother Thomas Swann Jr. complained to the General Court that he had not been paid for carrying parties of Weyanoke, Appomatock and Maherin native Americans to the colonial capital.

In 1706, Thomas Swann Jr. sold Swann's Point to John Joseph Jackman. Three years later, Jackman sold it to Major George Marrable, who three months later sold the plantation to his brother-in-law, John Hartwell. Hartwell died in 1714, and his minor daughter Elizabeth inherited Swann's Point when she came of age. She later married Richard Cocke of Henrico County, and the couple resided at Swann's Point. It remained in the Cocke family for several generations and was the birthplace of General John Hartwell Cocke who later became associated with Bremo in Fluvanna County. During the American Civil War, it was shelled by federal troops and later held an important telegraph line often cut by Confederates.

In the mid-1900s, the plantation state Sen. Garland Gray, purchased the manor house and used it as a summer home until it was destroyed by fire. Later, Gray, who was one of the wealthiest men in Virginia and owned tens of thousands of acres of land bet the Swann's Point property on the game of cards and lost. True to his word he transferred the property to the winner.

The site which contains 17th-century graves was listed on the National Register of Historic Places in 1975. A portion of the Swann's Point area was donated by the owners to the National Park Service in 1974 to forestall the construction of a bridge across the James River to the area.

== See also ==
- National Register of Historic Places listings in Surry County, Virginia
