= William Drummond (colonial governor) =

Governor of Albemarle County, Carolina from 1663 to 1667

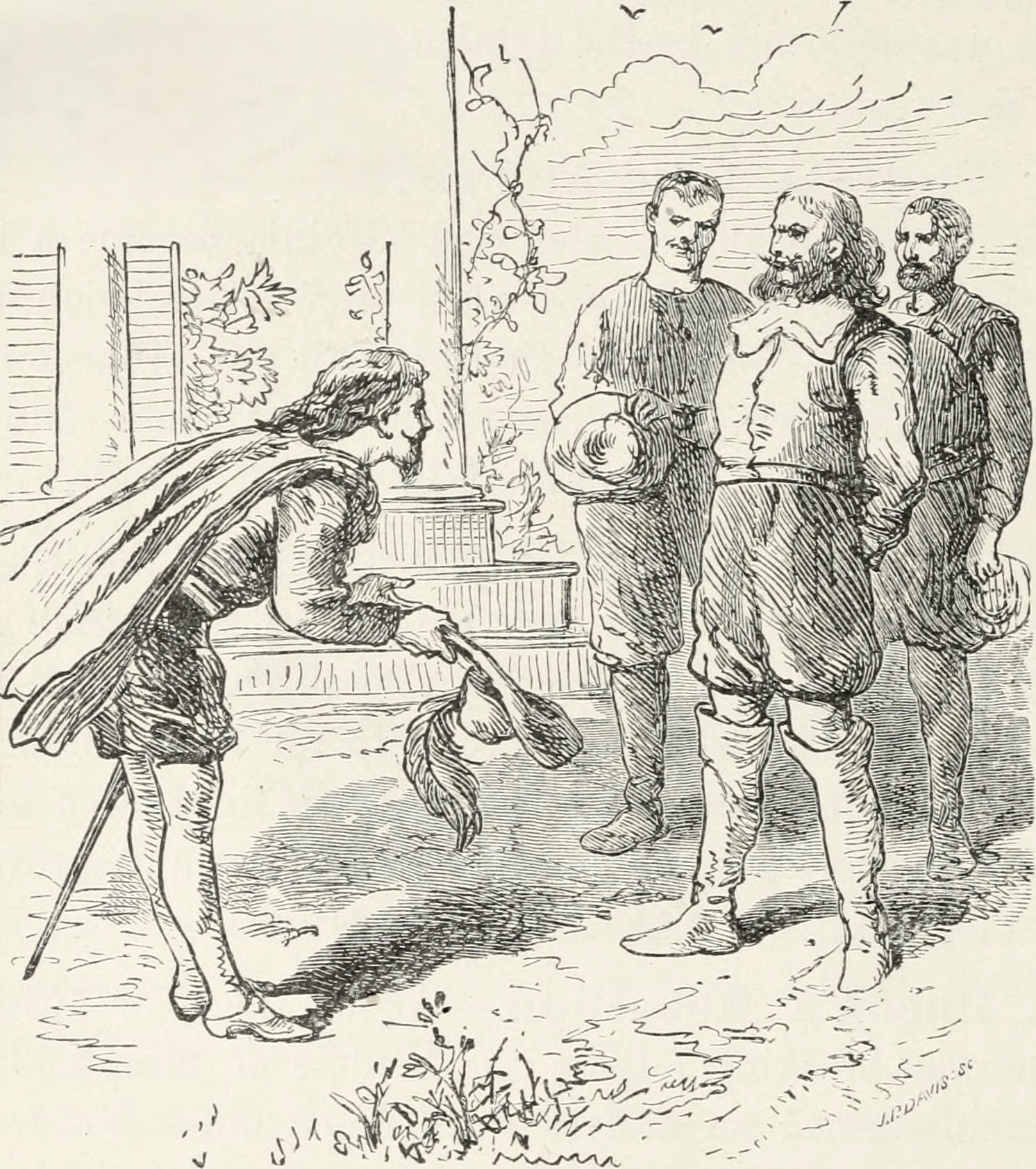
- Governor Berkeley (bowing) receiving captured rebel William Drummond (right)

1st Governor of Albemarle County, Carolina
- In office October 1663 – October 1667
- Succeeded by: Samuel Stephens

Personal details
- Born: 1617 Scotland
- Died: 1677 (aged 59–60) Colony of Virginia
- Cause of death: Execution by hanging
- Spouse: Sarah Drummond

William Drummond (1617 – 1677) was the first governor of Albemarle County, Carolina from 1663 to 1667. He is best known for his role in Bacon’s Rebellion.

== Early life ==
Drummond was born in Scotland and came to Virginia in 1637 as an indentured servant to Theodore Moyes. By 1639, Moyes sold his contract to another planter, Stephen Webb, whom some characterize as an "abusive master", from whom Drummond and several others ran away. Apprehended, tried and found guilty by the local court, Drummond had his indenture extended and received a whipping, but survived the experience. After his indenture expired, Drummond rented a parcel from Governor William Berkeley within the Governor's Land in 1648 and became a successful planter and real estate investor.

By 1662, he had married Sarah Drummond, who that year patented a half acre she had inherited from mariner Edward Prescott. Sarah also bore at least five children during her marriage with Drummond, as she cited in litigation following his execution, as discussed below.

== Career ==
By May 1656, Drummond owned a town lot in Jamestown, which he sold to John Barber in December 1664, not long after the Virginia General Assembly decided to subsidize the construction of brick houses in the colony's capital. Ultimately, the Drummonds owned one of the finest brick houses in Jamestown. During the 1660s, while in Carolina as discussed below, Drummond also patented 4,750 acres in Westmoreland County, Virginia, as well as bought 600 acres and laid claim to an additional 500 acres in that northern section of Tidewater Virginia. Drummond also acquired 1,200 acres on the east side of the Chickahominy River in Virginia (near its confluence with Warrany Creek), and expanded that parcel in 1674. He also bought from Mathew Edloe 700 acres in James City County in 1668 and patented 960 acres in Lower Norfolk County (which became Norfolk County) in 1672. In 1672, Drummond, Mathew Page and Theophilus Hone received payment in advance after agreeing to construct a 250 foot long fort at Jamestown, but Page soon died and both Drummond and Hone were hauled before the General Court and ordered to replace defective bricks as well as complete the contract. Drummond failed to respond to a summons issued by sheriff Francis Kirkman, a friend of Virginia Governor William Berkeley.

Following his daughter's marriage to Samuel Swann, the eldest son of tavernkeeper and powerful planter Thomas Swann, Drummond held local offices in Jamestown and surrounding James City County, including as a Justice of the Peace, High Sheriff of James City County, bailiff of the Quarter Court and sergeant at arms of the Virginia General Assembly (which met at designated times in Jamestown). However, Drummond also clashed with several powerful planters, including Theodorick Bland and Bryan Smith.

In 1664, Governor Berkeley chose Drummond (who had visited the Albemarle County colony in 1653) as his emissary to the then-ungoverned colony (which would eventually become North Carolina), as requested by Berkeley's fellow Lords Proprietor for that colony. Drummond became the new colony's first governor and summoned the first legislative assembly in Carolina in 1665. However, he criticized Berkeley's policies toward the Carolina colony, so Berkeley dismissed him and appointed Samuel Stephens to succeed him as governor. During Drummond's time as governor, he and several others went hunting in the Great Dismal Swamp and became lost; Drummond was the expedition's only survivor. In 1665 Drummond discovered the water source for the Great Dismal Swamp, which lies at its center and is now called Lake Drummond in his honor. 19th century historian John W. Moore characterized Drummond as a man who deserved respect and confidence, based on his plain and prudent lifestyle and concern for the people he governed.

The 1677 inventory of Drummond's estate indicated that he owned three slaves.

== Bacon's Rebellion ==
Drummond returned to Virginia in 1667 and later supported Nathaniel Bacon during Bacon's Rebellion against Governor Berkeley's government. Bacon may have half expected Drummond to convince people in the Albemarle colony to also rise against Governor Berkeley, but the Carolinians had no interest in the Virginia conflict and even if they did, could have provided negligible help to that rebellion. On September 19, 1676, as Bacon's followers burned Jamestown, Drummond set his own house ablaze, although he also rescued government records by moving them from the statehouse.

In fact, Bacon was captured during a secret night meeting with Drummond and tavernkeeper Richard Lawrence, another follower with a leadership record. After Bacon died of illness, Drummond and Lawrence attempted to rally his followers, but were defeated. Drummond attempted to escape toward the Dismal Swamp, but was hunted down in the Chickahominy Swamp by Capt. Swann and others. Six days later he was tried before Governor Berkeley at the house of Berkeley's supporter James Bray.

== Death and legacy ==
After finding Drummond guilty of treason and rebellion against the king in a rapid trial at the house of his supporter James Bray, Governor Berkeley had Drummond hanged near Jamestown on January 20, 1677. Based on the treason conviction, Governor Berkeley confiscated Drummond's property before he sailed to England (where he died). However, Drummond's widow (and executor of his estate) Sarah, initially supported (with her five children) by Bacon's allies, demanded that Lady Berkeley return the property. After Lady Berkeley refused, litigation evolved on both sides of the Atlantic Ocean. Contemporary accounts of the rebellion were written by Governor Berkeley, as well as by Ann Dunbar Cotton, the wife of John Cotton who lived on Queen's Creek in York County near Jamestown. Ironically, Drummond patented some land based on paying for the transatlantic passage of both Cottons. Ann Cotton may also have written and elegiac poem honoring Bacon.

By 1693, Drummond's son and heir, William Drummond Jr., was the (paid) sergeant-at-arms for the Virginia General Assembly, as well as a justice of the peace for James City County. He purchased a lot in Jamestown in 1701, which descended to his son, William Drummond III, who sold it to Edward Champion Travis in 1753.

The large, circular lake in the center of the Great Dismal Swamp was named Lake Drummond to honor his 1655 discovery.

Archeologists at Jamestown have also excavated fellow conspirator Richard Lawrence's house in Jamestown.
