= Thomas Swann Jr. =

Thomas Swann

Member of the House of Burgesses for Nansemond County, Colony of Virginia
- In office 1703-1704 Serving with Henry Jenkins
- Preceded by: Thomas Milner
- Succeeded by: Daniel Sullivan

Member of the Virginia House of Burgesses for Surry County, Colony of Virginia
- In office 1693-1699 Serving with =John Thompson, Benjamin Harrison
- Preceded by: Samuel Swann
- Succeeded by: Thomas Holt
- In office 1679-April 1682 Serving with =William Browne
- Preceded by: Samuel Swann
- Succeeded by: Arthur Allen II

Personal details
- Born: October 1659 Swann's Point Plantation, Surry County, Colony of Virginia
- Died: 1704 Nansemond County, Virginia
- Spouse: Eliza Thompson
- Children: Samuel Swann, Thomas Swann Jr. and three others
- Parent(s): Thomas Swann, Mary Mansfield
- Relatives: Samuel Swann (burgess) (brother)
- Occupation: tavernkeeper, militia officer, planter, politician

Thomas Swann Jr. (ca. 1650 – 1704) was a planter, militia officer and politician in the Colony of Virginia who represented first his native Surry County and later Nansemond County in the House of Burgesses.

== Early and family life ==
Born to the widowed Mary Mansfield and her planter and politician husband Thomas Swann, he had an elder half-brother Samuel Swann who administered his father's estate with his stepmother.

== Career ==
He was elected sheriff of Surry County in 1697. Surry County voters elected him as one of their representatives in the House of Burgesses in 1695, re-elected him in 1696 and again elected him in 1698. Both times he won election to the House (but of course not when he won re-election), Swann succeeded his elder half brother Samuel Swann, who eventually moved to North Carolina.

== Personal life ==
He married Elizabeth (Eliza), the daughter of William Thompson of Nansemond County, and their eldest son Thompson Swann became clerk of Cumberland County, serving from 1754 until 1781.

== Death and legacy ==
He died in 1704 or 1705.
