= Thomas Swann (councillor) =

Colonel Thomas Swann

Member of the Virginia Governor's Council
- In office 1659-1680

Member of the House of Burgesses for Surry County, Colony of Virginia
- In office 1658 Serving with William Butler, William Cawfield, William Edwards
- Preceded by: William Batt
- Succeeded by: George Jordan

Member of the Virginia House of Burgesses for James City County, Colony of Virginia
- In office 1649 Serving with William Barrett, Walter Chiles, John Dunston, George Reade, William Whittaker
- Preceded by: William Davis
- Succeeded by: John Flood
- In office 1645 Serving with Walter Chiles, John Flood, Ambrose Harmer, Peter Ridley, George Stevens, Thomas Warne, Robert Wetherall
- Preceded by: William Barrett
- Succeeded by: William Barrett

Personal details
- Born: May 1616 Swann's Point Plantation, James City County, Colony of Virginia
- Died: September 16, 1680 (aged 64) Swann's Point Plantation, Surry County, Colony of Virginia
- Resting place: Swann's Point Plantation, Surry County, Virginia
- Spouse(s): Margaret Debton (d.1646), Sara Codd (b. 1654), Sarah Chandler (d. 1662), Ann Brown (d. 1668), Mary Edwards Mansfield
- Children: Samuel Swann, Thomas Swann Jr. and three others
- Parent(s): William Swann, Judith
- Relatives: John Swann (burgess) (grandson), John Swann (politician) (great-grandson)
- Occupation: tavernkeeper, militia officer, planter, politician

Thomas Swann (May 1616 – May 23, 1680) was a planter, tavernkeeper, militia officer and politician in the Colony of Virginia who sat in both houses of the Virginia General Assembly and survived Bacon's Rebellion.

== Early life and education ==
Born to early immigrant William Swann (1586-1638) and his first wife Judith (1589-1636), across the James River from Jamestown, Thomas received a private education appropriate to his class. He was named to honor his knighted grandfather and uncle, both also named Thomas Swann, but who died in Southfleet in Kent County, England, and had another uncle named George Swann. Complicating matters, Sir Francis Swann of Denton in County Kent, England, also had a son William, but that man was a younger son, with eldest brother Edward Swann administering that nobleman's estate and bequests to sons Francis, Peter, John and William and daughters Ann, Dorothy and Elizabeth. His father was a royal revenue collector.

== Planter ==
In 1635 Swann repatented 1,200 acres on the south side of the James River that his father had previously began developing as a plantation known as Swann's Point. Swann increased his landholdings in part through advantageous marriages, such as that to Ann, the widow of Col. Henry Brown of Four Mile Tree plantation, although in that instance Swann posted a bond to safeguard that estate for Brown's son, Berkeley Brown. In 1658 and 1659, Swann also patented large tracts of land south of the James River in what had become Surry County in 1652 (and part of Lawne's Creek parish, whose parish church was on Hog Island in the James River), and another 500 acres in James City County in 1668. Swann owned both a town lot in Jamestown (on which he erected and operated a tavern) as well as a rural parcel.

== Officer, tavernkeeper and legislator ==
Swann operated a tavern at Wareneck, near the Surry county seat and inland from his Swann's Point home, and later also operated a tavern in Jamestown, as well as a tannery in Surry County. That Jamestown tavern opened before Bacon's Rebellion and was torched along with the rest of the capitol town on September 19, 1676, but ultimately rebuilt. Swann initially used employees to run his taverns, but eventually signed a contract with Surry tavernkeeper William Thompson, whose son (William Thompson Jr.) managed the Jamestown tavern for a time despite being underage (but would later be sued by Swann for failing to cover debts incurred).

Swann received his first public office, as tobacco viewer for the land between Smith's Fort and Grindon Hill, in 1640. James City County voters elected him as one of the men representing them in the House of Burgesses in 1645, and again in 1649.

Swann also became involved in litigation, and not always for debts owing or owed. He was held responsible for the death of his servant Elizabeth Buck, and in 1660 was fined for failing to collect some taxes on exported tobacco.

Upon the foundation of Surry County in 1652, Swann held many important offices in that county (in which Swann's Point was located). He served as the county sheriff in that year, was probably also a justice of the peace, and ultimately rose to become Lieutenant Colonel of its militia. Surry County voters elected Swann as one of their representatives in the 1658 term in the Virginia House of Burgesses. The following year, 1659, Swann was appointed to the upper house of the assembly, sometimes known as the Virginia Council of State, and remained in that office (despite being unseated briefly after Bacon's Rebellion as discussed below) until his death.

One of the petitions that foreshadowed Bacon's Rebellion was signed at the Lawne's Creek parish church on December 12, 1673, for which Mathew Swann was convicted by the General Court on April 6, 1674, but had his 2000 pounds of tobacco fine remitted by Governor Berkeley on September 23, 1674. Indentured servants and poor planters who owned no property had lost their right to vote for burgesses in 1670, yet all were required to pay a head tax in tobacco, whereas landowners were not taxed on their real estate.

When Bacon's Rebellion began in 1676 (following a Native American raid in 1675), Swann attempted to set a moderate course, never breaking openly with Governor William Berkeley, who underestimated the situation's seriousness. However, the Surry County court did send provisions to the rebels, despite the objection of 24-year old Arthur Allen II, heir to what later known as Bacon's Castle and future speaker of the House of burgesses. Moreover, Swann was among the signatories of a proclamation dated April 11, 1676 to convene the House of Burgesses that September. Swann also was among the 69 prominent men who signed orders Bacon issued in August 1676, and was present when the rebels burned Jamestown in September, but not his plantation. By contrast, Arthur Allen II had led Berkeley's forces in an unsuccessful sortie against the rebels days before they burned Jamestown. In addition to his brother Mathew's involvement with the rebels, his son Samuel's wife Sarah was a daughter of William Drummond, a former indentured servant and favorite of Governor Berkeley who became one of Bacon's lieutenants and who would eventually be executed for his part in the rebellion.

After Bacon died of illness that fall, on February 10, 1677, Governor Berkeley finally issued an amnesty proclamation recommended by royal authorities the previous October, and Thomas Swann was one of those listed as exempted from the king's pardon. Beginning in the previous month, when Governor Berkeley refused to entertain the three royal commissioners sent from England to investigate the rebellion (new lieutenant governor Herbert Jeffreys, as well as Francis Moryson and Sir John Berry), they stayed at Swann's Point. On February 6, 1677, Berkeley sent the commissioners a note via his supporter Theophilus Hone saying he had requested Swann to provide them accommodations. That December, the commissioners recommended to Governor Jeffreys that Swann be given some reward for his kindness and expenses incurred in receiving them. Historians differ as to whether Swann was a member of Berkeley's Green Spring Faction. Warren M. Billings aligns him among the "irreconcilables" with Thomas and Philip Ludwell, Robert Beverley, Thomas Ballard, James Bray and burgesses Thomas Milner, Arthur Allen and William Kendall, but others distinguished among them. Governor Berkeley died within six weeks of reaching London.

Upon Berkeley's removal from office, Swann regained his seat on the governor's council, and held it until his death.

== Personal life ==
As related by his son Samuel, Thomas Swann survived four wives, and his widow married. His first wife, Margaret Debton (d. 1646) bore 2 sons (both of whom died young in England) and a daughter, but only Susanna (1640-1660) reached adulthood. She died eight months and 22 days after marrying Captain William Marriott of Surry County, so childbirth complications may have been the cause. In January 1649 the widower remarried, to Sarah Codd, possibly the daughter or sister of officer and future burgess St. Leger Codd, and who died five years later. Their son Samuel Swann, would carry on his father's legacy as a planter and politician, serving in the House of Burgesses during his father's lifetime but later moving to North Carolina where supposedly became Speaker of that colony's lower house. However, neither his brother Sampson nor sister Sarah reached adulthood. Swann's third wife, the former Sarah Chandler, bore two sons and two daughters, none of whom reached adulthood, and she died in 1662. Swann's fourth wife, Ann, was the widow of councilor Henry Brown, and bore no children in this marriage, but died in 1688. Swann's fifth wife and widow, Mary Mansfield, bore four children (of whom three survived to adulthood), including the fraternal twin Thomas Swann Jr. who would manage his elder brother's Virginia properties during his travels, moved to Nansemond Countyafter marrying an heiress, and also served in the House of Burgesses. His fraternal twin Francis never reached adulthood, but his sister Mary married Richard Bland, and Sarah married Henry Randolph and after his death, Giles Webb

== Death ==
Swann died on September 16, 1680, and was buried on his Swann's Point estate in a tomb with crest and epitaph. His crest is cracked and lies within a soy bean field as of 2010. Because his widow informed the local court that her husband's last will and testament could not be found, she was named executrix. She and her stepson Samuel Swann attempted to collect debts owed this man's estate. In one lawsuit, a bricklayer claimed he had paid part of his debt to Swnn in tobacco, as well as worked for Swann at Jamestown, which one historian believes might have involved the brick building which replaced the burned tavern. The following year, Samuel Swann and his stepmother sued Jamestown tavernkeeper John Everett for back rent, but he claimed a deduction for room and board accorded the decedent. Swann's widow Mary remarried, to Robert Randall by July 1785. The Swann tavern survived in Jamestown until around 1700 (another fire destroyed the town in 1699, prompting the government's move to Williamsburg). His son and principle heir, Samuel Swann, had difficulties with at least one of the several Virginia governors in the late 17th century, and tobacco cultivation also may have made the property less fertile. He thus sold Swann Point plantation and moved to Carolina, where he helped develop Perquimans County, North Carolina and became speaker of that colony's assembly before his death in 1707. His brother Thomas Swann Jr. moved to Nansemond County after marrying an heiress and also served in the Virginia House of Burgesses, but was the last of this line to do so. Samuel's son (this man's grandson) John Swann (burgess) served in the North Carolina Governor's Council, and his son (this man's great-grandson) John Swann (politician) represented North Carolina in the U.S. Congress. The Swann's Point Plantation Site was listed on the National Register for Historic Places in 1975, and part is now owned by the National Park Service, having been donated in order to prevent construction of a bridge across the James River there, although a roadway gate prevents most public access.
