= Samuel Swann =

Major Samuel Swann

Member of the House of Burgesses for Surry County, Colony of Virginia 1
- In office 1684-1688 Serving with Arthur Allen II
- Preceded by: William Browne
- Succeeded by: Francis Mason
- In office 1677-April 1682 Serving with William Browne
- Preceded by: Benjamin Harrison
- Succeeded by: William Browne

Personal details
- Born: May 11, 1653 Swann's Point Plantation, James City County, Colony of Virginia
- Died: September 14, 1707 (aged 54) Perquimans plantation, Perquimans County, Colony of North Carolina
- Spouse(s): Sara Drummond II (m. 1673, died) Elizabeth Lillington
- Children: John Swann
- Parent(s): Thomas Swann, Sara Codd
- Relatives: Thomas Swann Jr. (brother)
- Occupation: planter, militia officer, politician

Samuel Swann (May 11, 1653 – September 14, 1707) was a planter, militia officer and politician in the Colony of Virginia and the Colony of North Carolina.

== Early and family life ==
Born at Swann's Point plantation to Sarah Codd, the second of five wives of prominent tavernkeeper, planter and politician Thomas Swann. He would have four half-siblings (three surviving until adulthood) by his father's fifth wife, the former Mary Edwards. Swann received a private education as befit his class.

In 1673, he married Sara Drummond II, daughter of William Drummond who became involved in Bacon's Rebellion three years later. Swann gave this man, her son in law, her power of attorney. He also handled his late father's estate together with his stepmother Mary Swann (who ultimately remarried Robert Randall), and rented a house from Rachel, the wife of William Sherwood, on behalf of the Governor's Council.

It is unclear when Sarah died, but Swann married his second wife, Elizabeth Lillington, after his move to North Carolina, where he later died.

== Career ==
=== Planter ===
Swann patented 248 acres of land in Surry County in 1668 which had once belonged to his half-brother Thomas Swann Jr. He later patented 960 acres in Norfolk County.

=== Politician ===
Swann began his political career as high sheriff of Surry County in 1675, to some extent following his father's public career path. Rebels burned Jamestown and one of his father's taverns during Bacon's rebellion in 1676. His father-in-law William Drummond sided with the rebels and was eventually executed, although this man's brother Thomas Swann Jr. as the Surry County sheriff in 1677 would be responsible for bringing many to trial.

Surry County voters elected Swann as one of their representatives in the House of Burgesses in 1677, and he won re-election to every assembly session through the 1788 session, except for the second session of 1682. Swann sat alongside fellow planter William Browne until 1680, when planter and veteran legislator Benjamin Harrison won the other seat representing the county. Planter Arthur Allen, who became speaker in the 1686 and 1688 sessions, was his fellow legislator for most of the final legislative sessions of Swann's Virginia legislative career.

Governor Francis Nicholson intensely disliked Swann, so Swann sold his father's Swann Point plantation to Joseph John Jackman sometime before 1710, and probably also sold his Jamestown property at around the same time (having bought out his stepmother's dower interest years earlier). He continued his political career after moving across the border to (North) Carolina, and was elected speaker of that colony's assembly.

== Death and legacy ==
Swann died on his Perquimans plantation in Carolina on September 14, 1707. His son His son John Swann (burgess) served in that county's Governor's Council and his son (this man's grandson) John Swann (politician) represented North Carolina in the U.S. Congress.

The Swann's Point Plantation Site was listed on the National Register for Historic Places in 1975, and is now owned by the National Park Service, having been donated in order to prevent construction of a bridge across the James River there.
