= William Allen (Claremont) =

Virginia politician (1768–1831)

Member of the Virginia House of Delegates representing Surry County
- In office December 6, 1802 – December 2, 1810 Serving with Nicholas Sebrill, William Randolph
- Preceded by: Lemuel Bayley
- Succeeded by: Henry William Scammell

Personal details
- Born: March 7, 1768 Upper Chippokes plantation, Surry County, Colony of Virginia
- Died: November 29, 1831 (aged 63) Surry County, Virginia
- Profession: planter, military officer, politician

William Allen (March 7, 1768 – November 29, 1831), was a wealthy planter, politician and militia officer from Surry County who served in the Virginia House of Delegates (1802–1810), as well as led county defenses during the British invasion in 1813-1814.

== Early life and education ==
The son of the former Mary Lightfoot (d. 1789), the second wife of William Allen, was born at his father's plantation at Upper Chippokes Creek in Surry County. Unlike his father and elder half brothers, he probably did not attend the College of William and Mary, but had private tutors as befit his class, since the author of his obituary noted he "was little indebted to books" but "gifted with a shrewd mind and possessed a vast deal of strong common sense." Although he had full sisters, like his elder half-brother, John Allen, who represented the county in the legislature and the Virginia Ratifying Convention of 1788, this William Allen never married.

== Career ==
Like his great uncle, burgess John Allen, this William Allen greatly expanded his patrimony, adding the larger Wakefield plantation (former seat of the Harrison family) to his holdings in 1808, and by 1831 owned more than 26,000 acres as well as more than 700 slaves. By the time of his death, he may have become the second wealthiest man in Virginia, next to James Bruce of Charlotte County considerably upstream.

Unlike the Burgess John Allen, this William Allen was known for his luxurious lifestyle, which included breeding and racing thoroughbred horses. Allen also invested in a spinning and weaving factory in Southampton County (created from the southern area of Isle of Wight County) and a drawbridge company downriver in Norfolk, as well as owned a freight-hauling schooner called the Claremont which traversed the James River. In addition, Allen owned shares in the Farmer's Bank of Virginia (upriver in Richmond), as well as the Petersburg Railroad Company.

Allen held local offices, including as justice of the peace for most of his adult life, and rose to become colonel of the Surry County militia.

In 1802, Surry county voters elected Allen to serve alongside veteran legislator Nicholas Sebrell as one of their (part-time) representatives in the Virginia House of Delegates, and re-elected the pair until 1807, when William Rudolph replaced Sebrell, who had become a state senator representing Surry and the adjacent Isle of Wight and Prince George Counties.

== Death and legacy ==
Allen died at the Union Hotel in Richmond on Novermer 29, 1831, after suffering a probable heart attack. He was buried at the family cemetery at Claremont. Allen bequeathed his property to William Griffith Orgain, the grandson of his sister Ann Armistead Allen Edloe, upon the stipulation that the young man change his surname to "Allen," and pass it to his own eldest son.
