= Four Mile Tree =

Historic house in Virginia, United States

- U.S. National Register of Historic Places
- Virginia Landmarks Register
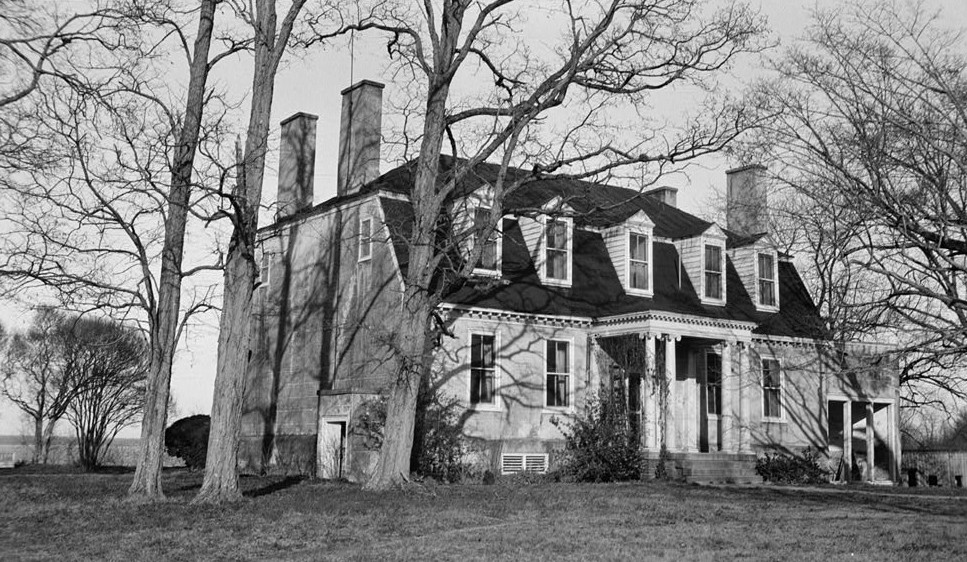
- Estate Manor, c. 1940

- Location within Virginia Location within the United States
- Nearest city: Surry, Virginia
- Coordinates: 37°12′17″N 76°51′10″W
- Area: 250 acres (100 ha)
- NRHP reference No.: 70000826
- VLR No.: 090-0009

Significant dates
- Added to NRHP: December 18, 1970
- Designated VLR: October 16, 1973

Four Mile Tree is the name of a plantation near Jamestown, Virginia that once encompassed two thousand acres (8 km^{2}), it was situated on the south bank of the James River opposite Jamestown, four miles (6 km) further north. On a hill near the water's edge a handsome old house overlooks the river. This plantation, was the seat of the Browne family for two hundred years. The first owner, Colonel Henry Browne, was a member of Sir William Berkeley's Council in 1643. The plantation house constructed circa 1745 remains well-preserved in its original historical state.

== Description ==
The Four Mile Tree Plantation House is a brick structure, one-and-one-half-stories with hip-on-gambrel roof, pedimented dormers and four interior end chimneys. The brick is laid in Flemish bond above the beveled watertable raith English bond below. The entire brick surface was stuccoed and scored in imitation ashlar in the nineteenth century but the stucco has deteriorated on portions of the facade and fallen off. All openings on the five-bay facade, except for the central entranceway, were altered in the late nineteenth century or early twentieth century and have two-over-two sash; the entranceway, sheltered by a nineteenth-century Roman Ionic porch, consists of a transom over three-paneled double doors, the top panel of each being scrolled. A modillioned cornice is used on the eaves.

Four Mile Tree's oldest interior woodwork is in the central stairhall where the turned balustrading on the stair, the heavy hand rail and the high dado place the date in the first half of the eighteenth century. The southwest room, which probably dates from the early nineteenth century, has two framed niches flanking a simple mantel and overmantel topped by an architrave, frieze and cornice; only the cornice and a paneled dado ornament the other walls of the room. The remaining rooms have mantels which seem to date from the first half of the nineteenth century but only in the southeastern room is there a paneled room.

Four Mile Tree is a successor to two of the earliest plantations in Virginia ("Burrow's Hill" and "Pace's Paines"). It is "ancient" in its own right having been founded in the first half of the seventeenth century; its grave-site contains the oldest legible tombstone in Virginia (1650). Four Mile Tree was the seat of the Brownes, a leading Surry family, from the Reign of Charles I until the death of their last male heir in 1799.

The plantation, named for its distance from Jamestown, was one of Surry County's more prosperous; its owners served as viewers of tobacco and had slaves from an early period. The Brownes were regularly Justices of the County Court throughout the colonial period. Several members of the family served on the Governor's Council or in the House of Burgesses during the seventeenth century. During the War for Independence, William Browne was a member of the Surry Committee of Safety and Lieutenant Colonel of Militia. His son, the last of his name to be Master of Four Mile Tree, was a lieutenant in the revolutionary militia. The British sacked the plantation during the War of 1812 according to the then Colonel of county militia. In 1815 the plantation passed to William Browne, Jr.'s granddaughter, Sally Elizabeth Bowdoin, and her husband, General Philip St. George Cocke. The Cockes lived at Four Mile tree until 1840 when they moved to another plantation, Belmeade, in Powhatan County, Virginia.

After the Cockes' departure no significant changes were made to the house until the late 20th century when a modern addition was added to the south side of the house. Four Mile Tree was added to the National Register of Historic Places in 1970. The plantation is a private residence.
