= Robert Beverley (major) =

British merchant and planter in Virginia

- Beverley's coat of arms

Attorney General for the Virginia colony pro tempore
- In office March 10, 1676 – May 20, 1677
- Preceded by: George Jordan
- Succeeded by: Edward Hill

Personal details
- Born: c. 1635 Kingston upon Hull, East Riding of Yorkshire, England
- Died: March 15, 1687 (aged 51–52) Middlesex County, Virginia, English America
- Spouses: Elizabeth (?; died 1662); Mary Keeble (m. 1666; died 1678) Katherine Hone (m. 1679)
- Children: 3, including Peter and Robert

Major Robert Beverley (c. 1635 – March 15, 1687) was an English-born merchant, attorney and military officer who served as the Attorney General of Virginia from 1676 to 1677.

Born in Yorkshire, he emigrated to the English colony of Virginia and worked as a merchant, growing wealthy from his business dealings. Following Bacon's Rebellion, Beverley was appointed as the colony's pro tempore attorney general. One of the wealthiest men in the Tidewater region during his lifetime, he eventually came to own roughly 28,000 acres in four counties along with several slaves, serving as the founder of the Beverley family of Virginia.

== Biography ==
=== Early and family life ===
Coat of Arms of William Beverley

Born in Kingston upon Hull in Yorkshire, England to the former Susanna Hollis (Kingston upon Hull, 1613-York, April 1681) and her husband Peter Beverley (c. 1610-?), he would have three younger brothers and four sisters. He was educated and learned about commerce in England. He also married his first wife, Elizabeth, who died in 1662, shortly after giving birth to their son, Peter Beverley.

Beverley married two more times after emigrating to Virginia as discussed below, and had two more sons who survived him. In 1666, in what later became Lancaster County, Virginia, he married the widow Mary Keeble, who bore a daughter and from four to six sons (of whom three reached adulthood) before her death in June 1678. Beverly married Katherine Hone on March 28, 1679, who bore three sons and one daughter.

=== Career ===
Beverley emigrated to the Colony of Virginia in 1663, following his first wife's death. His main income came from exporting his own and his neighbor's tobacco (more than 35,000 lbs in the 1671-1672 season), and importing (and reselling) manufactured goods ranging from soap to wrought iron to cloth and shoes.

He soon became surveyor for Gloucester and Middlesex Counties, as well as an attorney in the colony's courts. Governor William Berkeley made Beverley one of the first justices of the peace for Lancaster, when it was formed from Middlesex County. Beverley served as Lancaster County's sheriff before being named the colony's attorney general pro tempore.

During Bacon's Rebellion, Beverley proved his loyalty to Governor Berkeley, particularly in rounding ringleaders (sometimes on horseback) and taming the rebellion, although his harsh methods gave rise to complaints. The House of Burgesses elected him as its clerk in February 1676/77, and he refused to give the royal commissioners investigating the rebellion access to the House journals and papers, rationalizing that he could not get permission because it was no longer in session. The assembly of October 1677 protested the royal commissioners' seizing the documents as a violation of legislative privilege, both to Berkeley's replacement, Lieutenant Governor Herbert Jeffreys and the Privy Council back in England. The commissioners reported that Beverley was “the only person that gott [sic] by those unhappy troubles, in Plunderinge (without distinction of honest mens Estates from others).” The Crown responded by dismissing Beverley from all civil offices and mandated that duplicates of all House and Council journals be sent to London regularly. However, the dismissal cost Beverley little and raised his stature with the burgesses and councilors, so they re-elected him clerk in 1679. The next Governor, Thomas Culpeper, dared not oppose his re-appointment as clerk (Culpeper even later claimed that this gave him the power to appoint the clerk).

However, Beverley overreached in encouraging planters in Gloucester, Middlesex and New Kent Counties in what grew into tobacco cutting riots to protest low prices. The previous year, Beverley had required each county designate a town from which tobacco would be shipped, and (with his large personal inventory of tobacco) had a considerable stake in raising prices and limiting the export of other tobacco. On May 12, 1682, an arrest warrant was issued against Beverley, he was removed from all positions of public trust, and taken into custody. A biographer estimates his income from public offices in 1683 as £425. However, Governor Culpeper returned to England and his deputy, Sir Henry Chicheley, died before deciding what to do, so Beverley remained a prisoner until brought before the General Court in the spring of 1684. Found guilty of "high Misdemeanors" but not treason, Beverly confessed his error and was pardoned late in the session. Although the burgesses chose Thomas Milner for their clerk during that session, Beverley again won election as the burgesses' clerk on November 3, 1685 by a vote of 19 to 17. However, in 1686, the next Governor, Francis Howard, 5th Baron Howard of Effingham, charged Beverley had altered a bill after it passed the House. Thus on August 1, 1686, King James II again stripped Beverley of all offices, and formally granted the colony' governor the power to appoint the clerk of the House of Burgesses.

=== Death and legacy ===
Beverley never faced trial on those charges, for he died at home on March 15, 1687. He was buried four days later, and his youngest son was christened on the same day. Thus, his wife and three sons survived him. When Beverley died, his personal property alone was valued at £1,591, and the debts owed to him were valued at about £2,200. His eldest son Peter Beverley became Speaker of the House of Burgesses and the colony's secretary and treasurer, as well as a wealthy planter. His son Robert Beverley Jr. also served as the colony's secretary and with his elder brother saved government records from a disastrous fire.
