= William (Orgain) Allen =

Confederate military officer (1828–1875)

William Allen
- Born: July 29, 1828; Petersburg, Virginia
- Died: May 19, 1875 (aged 46); Surry County, Virginia
- Spouse: Frances Augusta Jessup (m. 1852)
- Children: 3 sons, 3 daughters
- Military career
- Allegiance: Virginia; Confederate States of America
- Branch: Virginia Militia; Confederate States Army
- Rank: Major (CSA)
- Unit: Jamestown Heavy Artillery
- Conflicts: American Civil War

William Allen (né William Griffin Orgain) (July 29, 1828–May 19, 1875) was a wealthy Virginian planter and entrepreneur who briefly served in the Confederate States Army as a Major.

== Early and family life ==
The younger of two sons born in Petersburg, Virginia to businessman Richard Griffin Orgain and his wife, the former Martha Armistead Edloe, Allen would also have 2 sisters At age two or three, his slightly elder brother having died as an infant, he inherited the 26,000-acre (110 km^{2}) Claremont Estate on the James River from his never-married and very wealthy grand-uncle, William Allen. To satisfy the terms of that inheritance (valued at more than $360,000), his surname was officially changed by the Virginia legislature to "Allen" in 1832. His father served as his guardian until his death in 1837, after which time his mother served as his guardian and increased his holdings.

Initially educated by tutors at Claremont, Allen attended Amelia Academy from 1844 until 1847. He then accompanied Rev. Philip Slaughter, an Episcopal clergyman, on a tour of the United States, then the pair toured in Europe until nearly the time that Allen reached legal age and thus came into his vast inheritance.

== Career ==
=== Planter and entrepreneur ===
On January 1, 1850, having reached legal age, Allen officially possessed nearly 23,000 acres in five Virginia counties, as well as more than $52,000 in cash. His property included Jamestown Island, Claremont plantation in Surry County south of the James River, as well as Kingsmill plantation in James City County and Curles Neck plantation in Henrico County on the north bank of the James. Allen also developed lumber and shipping businesses, and a railroad. Although contemporaries estimated that he owned 800 or a thousand enslaved people, tax and census records document varying numbers between 300 and 500. In 1840, he owned 238 slaves in Surry County alone, although a decade earlier despite his being underage, he owned 147 enslaved. By 1860, his landholdings were valued at $250,000 and his personal estate at $1 million, although he owned fewer slaves in Surry County.

From 1854 until a dissolution by mutual consent in 1857 (when Allen became the sole owner), Allen (supplying capital) partnered with John A. Selden and Augustus Hopkins to build a railroad and sawmill, from which they shipped timber from a wharf near Claremont. In 1858, Allen contracted with William A. Allen of Baltimore to deliver wood to Maryland. Allen also invested in a Richmond mercantile firm and operated schooners that carried freight on the James River.

In 1857, Allen allowed free access to Jamestown Island to commemorate the 250th anniversary of Jamestown's founding.

=== Confederate officer and sympathizer ===
Allen had been a lieutenant in a militia regiment after John Brown's raid on Harper's Ferry. He volunteered to serve the Confederate States Army after Virginia declared its secession, and on April 21, 1861 assembled fellow volunteers at Brandon Church upriver in Prince George County, which he organized as the "Brandon Heavy Artillery", which later became Company E of the 1st Virginia Artillery. According to tradition, Allen equipped the company himself. Furthermore, his slaves constructed fortifications, and he allowed rails from his railroad to be recycled to test the armor on the CSS Virginia. Stationed on Jamestown Island, the battery was to guard river access upriver toward Richmond. It was reorganized as the "Jamestown Heavy Artillery" on March 25, 1862. On April 4, 1862 Allen was promoted to major and the troops designated Company D of the 10th Battalion Virginia Heavy Artillery. However, after Yorktown fell to the federals on May 4, 1862, Jamestown Island was abandoned and Allen's troops assigned to defend Richmond.

Thus although initially a major supporter of the Confederacy, Allen resigned his military commission on August 19, 1862. He claimed to have already lost $450,000 in goods and material donated to the Confederate cause, and most of his land was occupied by Union troops. He also noted murders by freed slaves on Jamestown Island (former slaves having taken over the island in the summer of 1862 after federal troops occupied nearby Williamsburg), as well as plantation property damaged by looters and occupying Union forces. Men from Allen's Neck of Land plantation (led by a slave from his Claremont plantation) had proceeded to Jamestown Island, where they executed Jacob Shriver (uncle of Allen's wife, and a clerk who lived on the island and retained his Canadian citizenship) and Joseph A. Graves (the Surry County Commonwealth attorney whom Shriver had contacted), and left Gilbert Wooten (a free black loyal to Allen) to die of gunshots to his stomach, head and neck) as well as burnt the Ambler house).

=== Postwar ===
Allen received a pardon after the conflict. From 1862 until 1874, Allen lived in Richmond and at Curles Neck on the other side of the James River before returning to Claremont. Allen suffered significant financial distress despite mortgaging as much property as he could, because pursuant to the terms of the will by which he had acquired Claremont, his eldest son would inherit the manor.

== Personal life ==
Allen married Frances Augusta Jessup in Brockville, Canada on December 22, 1852. They had three daughters and three sons. Before the conflict, Allen was known for his lavish entertainments, and indulged in cigars and fine wine, as well as hunting and cruising aboard his yacht.

== Death and legacy ==
Allen died suddenly on May 19, 1875, supposedly of a chill that he caught on a boat trip. He was buried at Claremont, which pursuant to his benefactor's will, was bequeathed to Allen's eldest son. Newspaper obituaries reported that before the Civil War Allen was the wealthiest man in Virginia and one of the wealthiest in the South. The Virginia Historical Society holds many of his account books maintained by John A. Selden, and Allen's funeral is described in the James Nathaniel Dunlop papers at the same institution. His son William Allen IV inherited Claremont manor, but sold it after a decade and lived in New York City. Thus members of the extended Allen family owned it until 1886, when it was bought by J. Franklin Mancha, who developed a village named after the mansion. The property passed through many owners before being donated to the Felician sisters in 1964, who held it through the Bicentennial.
