= National Register of Historic Places listings in Lancaster County, Virginia =

Location of Lancaster County in Virginia

This is a list of the National Register of Historic Places listings in Lancaster County, Virginia.

This is intended to be a complete list of the properties and districts on the National Register of Historic Places in Lancaster County, Virginia, United States. The locations of National Register properties and districts for which the latitude and longitude coordinates are included below, may be seen in an online map.

There are 13 properties and districts listed on the National Register in the county, including 1 National Historic Landmark.

This National Park Service list is complete through NPS recent listings posted July 10, 2026.

== Current listings ==
	Name on the Register	Image	Date listed	Location	City or town	Description
1	Belle Isle	Belle Isle	February 6, 1973 (#73002031)	Southwestern side of the western end of Belle Isle Rd. 37°46′51″N 76°35′02″W	Lancaster	
2	Christ Church	Christ Church	October 15, 1966 (#66000841)	3 miles south of Kilmarnock on State Route 3; 37°40′50″N 76°25′24″W	Irvington	
3	Corotoman	Corotoman	September 15, 1970 (#70000805)	Orchard Point; 37°39′05″N 76°26′52″W	Weems	
4	Fox Hill Plantation	Fox Hill Plantation	November 17, 1978 (#78003026)	Southwest of Lively off State Route 201; 37°45′14″N 76°32′46″W	Lively	
5	Grace Episcopal Church	Grace Episcopal Church	June 5, 2017 (#100001045)	303 S. Main St. 37°42′23″N 76°22′45″W	Kilmarnock	
6	Greenfield	Greenfield	February 14, 2018 (#100002137)	412 Greenfields Ln. 37°40′44″N 76°21′31″W	White Stone	
7	Irvington	Irvington	December 8, 2000 (#00000895)	King Carter Dr. and Irvington Rd. 37°39′44″N 76°25′12″W	Irvington	
8	Lancaster Court House Historic District	Lancaster Court House Historic District	August 11, 1983 (#83003286)	State Route 3; 37°46′11″N 76°27′53″W	Lancaster	
9	Locustville	Locustville	October 21, 1994 (#94001239)	½ mile east of the eastern side of the junction of State Route 354 and Slabtown Rd. 37°41′29″N 76°30′17″W	Ottoman	
10	Pop Castle	Pop Castle	June 16, 1989 (#89000505)	Crab Point Rd. on the Rappahannock River; 37°38′27″N 76°25′33″W	White Stone	
11	St. Mary's, Whitechapel	St. Mary's, Whitechapel	November 12, 1969 (#69000254)	Northwest of the junction of State Routes 201 and 354; 37°44′48″N 76°33′11″W	Lively	
12	Verville	Verville	April 24, 1987 (#87000609)	West Point Rd. 37°43′14″N 76°28′42″W	Merry Point	
13	Village of Morattico Historic District	Village of Morattico Historic District	November 22, 2011 (#11000857)	Portions of Morattico Rd., Riverside and Saltwater Drs., Church and Sea Shell Lns., and Mulberry Creek and Water View Rds. 37°47′21″N 76°37′45″W	Morattico	

== See also ==
- List of National Historic Landmarks in Virginia
- National Register of Historic Places listings in Virginia
