= Virginia State Route 200 =

State highway in eastern Virginia, US

State Route 200

Route information
- Maintained by VDOT
- Length: 19.23 mi (30.95 km)
- Existed: 1933–present
- Tourist routes: Virginia Byway

Major junctions
- South end: SR 3 / SR 695 in White Stone
- SR 222 near Irvington; SR 3 in Kilmarnock
- North end: US 360 at Burgess

Location
- Country: United States
- State: Virginia
- Counties: Lancaster, Northumberland

Highway system
- Virginia Routes; Interstate; US; Primary; Secondary; Byways; History; HOT lanes
← SR 199	→ SR 201

State Route 200 (SR 200) is a primary state highway in the U.S. state of Virginia. The state highway runs 19.23 miles (30.95 km) from SR 3 in White Stone north to U.S. Route 360 (US 360) at Burgess. SR 200 is the main north–south highway of the eastern end of the Northern Neck. The state highway connects the Lancaster County towns of White Stone, Irvington, and Kilmarnock, where the highway intersects SR 3 again, with eastern Northumberland County.

== Route description ==
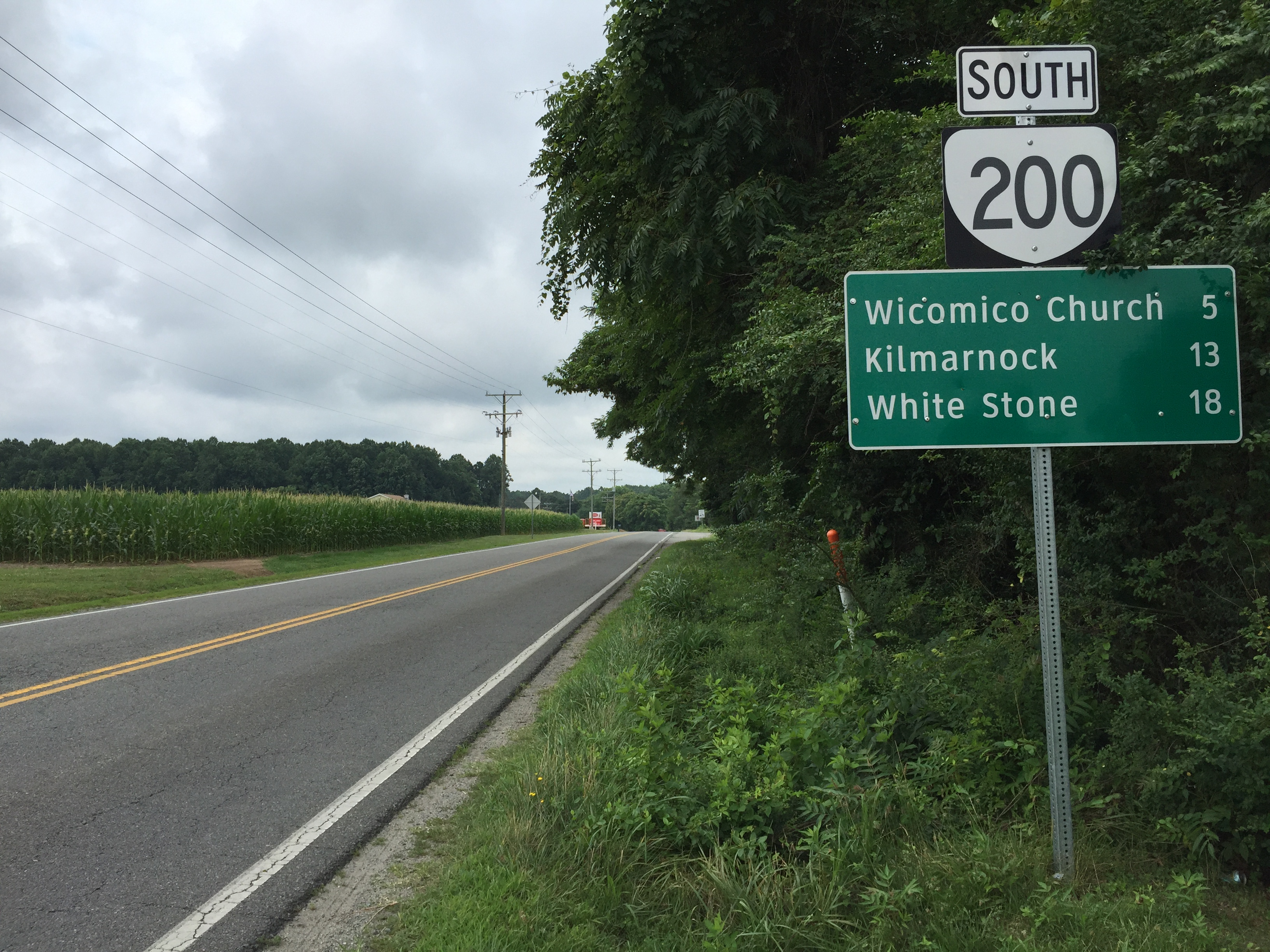
View south at the north end of SR 200 at US 360 in Burgess

SR 200 begins at an intersection with SR 3 (Rappahannock Drive) in the town of White Stone. The state highway heads west as Chesapeake Drive, which becomes Irvington Road on leaving the town. SR 200 crosses the Eastern Branch of Carter Creek into the town of Irvington, where the highway curves north. The state highway leaves the town and passes through the hamlet of Pitmans Corner, the site of historic Christ Church. North of Pitmans Corner, SR 200 meets the northern end of SR 222 (Weems Road) and veers northeast to the town of Kilmarnock. In the center of town, the state highway briefly runs concurrently with SR 3 (Main Street).

SR 200 continues north along Church Street and roughly follows the height of land between the direct Chesapeake Bay drainage on the east and the watershed of the Corrotoman River, a tributary of the Rappahannock River, on the west; the drainage boundary also forms the boundary between Lancaster and Northumberland counties. Three blocks north of SR 3, the state highway runs on top of the county line to the northern edge of Kilmarnock, where the highway has two stretches where it veers west of the county boundary. At the hamlet of Good Luck, SR 200 fully enters Northumberland County for the first time and the route's name becomes Jessie DuPont Memorial Highway, named for the 20th century philanthropist Jessie Ball duPont. South of Mount Olive, the state highway briefly re-enters Lancaster County before returning to Northumberland County for good. SR 200 passes through the village of Wicomico Church and crosses the Great Wicomico River between Tipers and Blackwells. The state highway reaches its northern terminus at US 360 (Northumberland Highway) in the village of Burgess.

== Major intersections ==
County	Location	mi	km	Destinations	Notes
Lancaster	White Stone	0.00	0.00	SR 3 (Rappahannock Drive) / SR 695 south (Chesapeake Drive) – Palmer, Foxwells, Westland, Windmill Point, Gloucester	Southern terminus
Lancaster				SR 222 south (Weems Road) – Weems	Northern terminus of SR 222
Lancaster	Kilmarnock	6.43	10.35	SR 3 east (Main Street) – White Stone	South end of concurrency with SR 3
Lancaster	Kilmarnock	6.52	10.49	SR 3 west (Main Street) – Warsaw, Fredericksburg	North end of concurrency with SR 3
Northumberland	Burgess	19.23	30.95	US 360 (Northumberland Highway) – Richmond, Reedville	Northern terminus
1.000 mi = 1.609 km; 1.000 km = 0.621 mi: Concurrency terminus

< SR 604	District 6 State Routes; 1928–1933	SR 606 >
