= Virginia State Route 222 =

State highway in Lancaster County, Virginia, US

State Route 222
- Weems Road

Route information
- Maintained by VDOT
- Length: 4.17 mi (6.71 km)
- Existed: 1933–present

Major junctions
- South end: Dead end at Weems
- North end: SR 200 near Irvington

Location
- Country: United States
- State: Virginia
- Counties: Lancaster

Highway system
- Virginia Routes; Interstate; US; Primary; Secondary; Byways; History; HOT lanes
← US 221	→ SR 223

State Route 222 (SR 222) is a primary state highway in the U.S. state of Virginia. Known as Weems Road, the state highway runs 4.17 miles (6.71 km) from Weems north to SR 200 near Irvington in southern Lancaster County.

== Route description ==
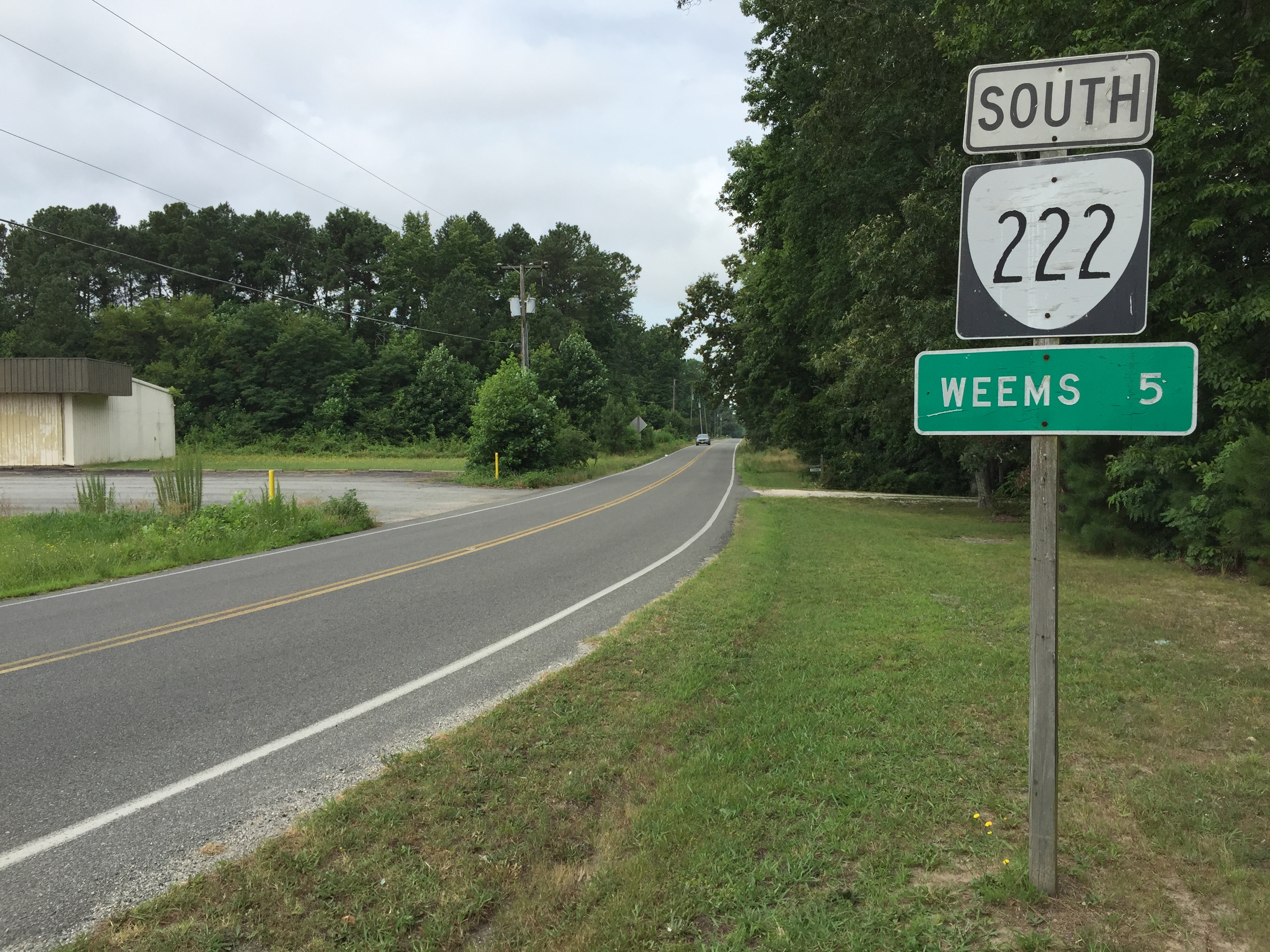
View south at the north end of SR 222 at SR 200 near Irvington

SR 222 begins at a dead end at Carter Creek in the village of Weems. The state highway heads west, then makes a right-angle turn north. SR 222 curves northeast, passing to the west of North Weems and Christ Church. The state highway reaches its northern terminus at SR 200 (Irvington Road) north of Irvington.

== Major intersections ==
The entire route is in Lancaster County.

Location	mi	km	Destinations	Notes
Weems	0.00	0.00	Dead end at Carter Creek	Southern terminus
	4.17	6.71	SR 200 (Irvington Road) – Fredericksburg, Irvington, White Stone	Northern terminus
1.000 mi = 1.609 km; 1.000 km = 0.621 mi

< SR 626	District 6 State Routes; 1928–1933	SR 628 >
