= George H. Steuart (physician) =

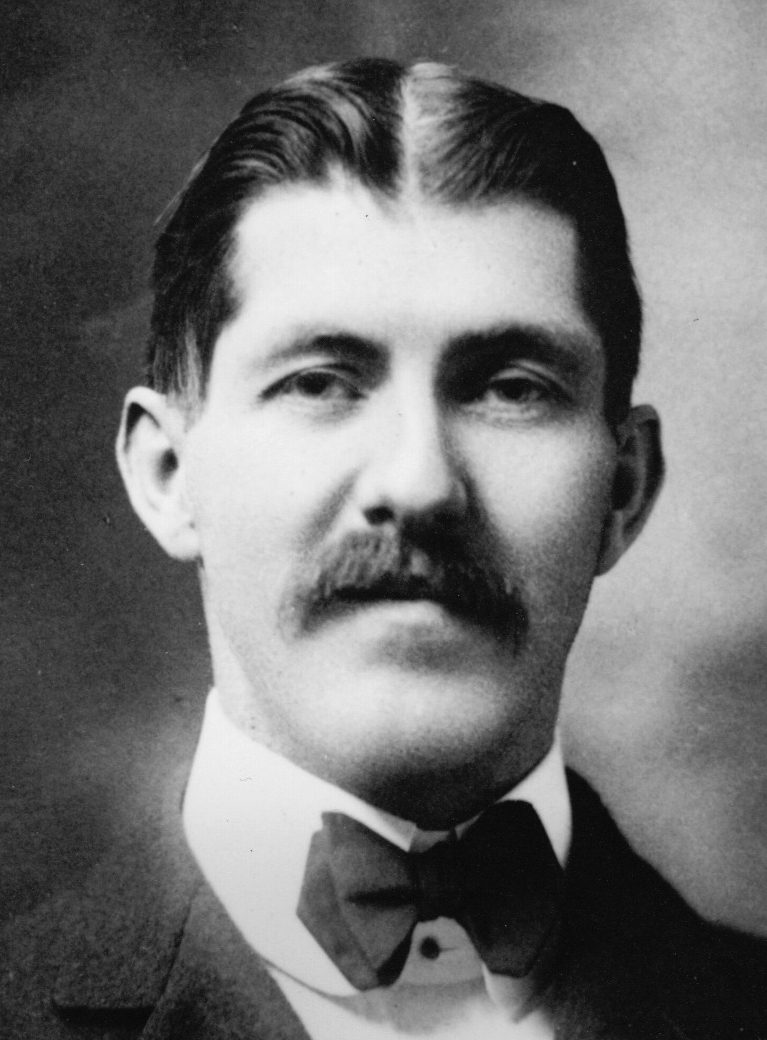
- Photograph of George H. Steuart c. 1900
- Born: April 10, 1865; West River, Maryland, US
- Died: January 6, 1945 (aged 79); Richmond, Virginia, US
- Education: Medical School of the University of Maryland in Baltimore
- Known for: Rosewood Training School, Lewis Gundry Sanitarium
- Spouse: Virginia Irene Blakemore (m. 1903; died 1967)
- Relatives: George H. Steuart (politician) great-great Grandfather; George H. Steuart (diplomat), son
- Medical career
- Profession: Physician
- Sub-specialties: Mental illness

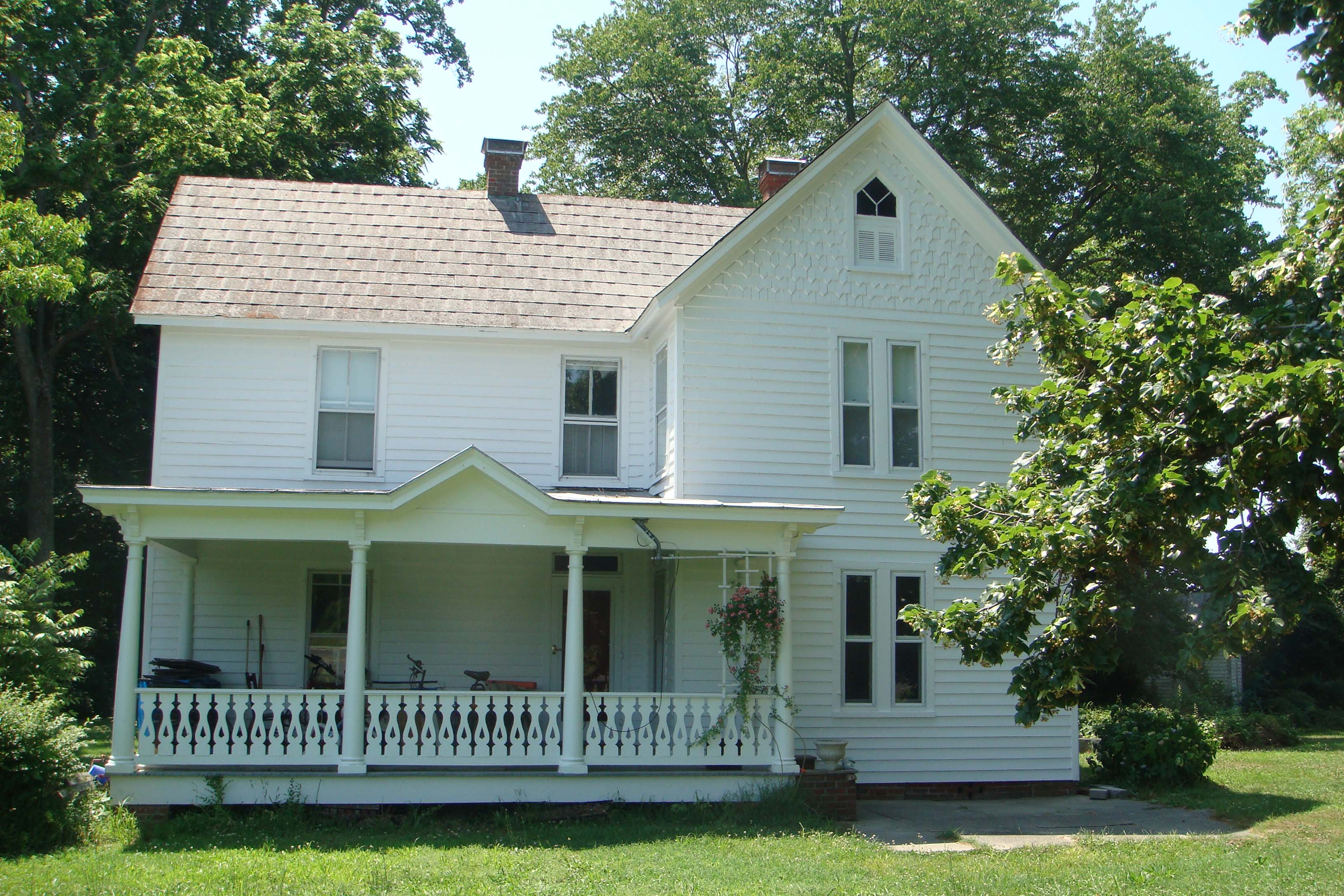
Steuart's home in Ottoman, Virginia

George Hume Steuart (April 10, 1865 – January 6, 1945) was an American physician from Maryland who occupied a number of leading medical positions. He served at various times as superintendent of the Maryland University Hospital, chief medical director at the Rosewood Training School at Owings Mills, Maryland, and superintendent of the Lewis Gundry Sanitarium at Relay, Maryland. At the time of his death he was chairman of the Lancaster County Board of Supervisors, serving his third term.

== Early life ==
Steuart was born in West River, Maryland, on April 10, 1865. He was the son of Captain George Biscoe Steuart (1817–1884). Steuart's grandfather was Dr Charles Calvert Steuart (1784–1836), a physician from Prince George's County, Maryland, who married Ann Fitzhugh Biscoe on November 1, 1814.

On October 19, 1903, Steuart married Irene Blakemore in Baltimore. The couple had two children, Virginia Louise Steuart, born on April 8, 1905, and George Hume Steuart, born November 3, 1907.

== Career ==
In 1898 Steuart graduated from the Medical School of the University of Maryland in Baltimore, soon becoming superintendent of the University Hospital. In 1902 Steuart was appointed assistant surgeon in the United States Marine Hospital in Baltimore. In the same year Dr Steuart was appointed personal physician to his cousin and namesake, the Confederate general George Hume Steuart, at times living with the general at his Mount Steuart farmhouse. In 1903 General Steuart wrote that his cousin "Dr George Hume Steuart has devoted much time to me in my different cases of sickness, leaving his practice in Baltimore and living part of the time at my residence."

Later, in 1918, he became assistant superintendent and chief medical director at the Rosewood Training School (as it was then known) at Owings, Maryland, where he remained for six years, until 1924. Rosewood was founded in 1898 to "receive, care for and educate all idiotic, imbecile and feeble-minded persons". In 1924 Steuart became superintendent of the Lewis Gundry Sanitarium at Relay, Maryland, a private sanitarium founded in 1900 for the "care of nervous disorders of women that required treatment and rest away from home". After two years his health began to decline and he returned to his home in Ottoman, Virginia, where he developed a local medical practice.

Steuart was a charter member of the Northern Neck Electric Cooperative. He also helped to organise the Corrotoman Farmers Cooperative, and was elected its president. Steuart served three terms as a member of the Lancaster County Board of Supervisors, and was chairman at the time of his death.

== Death and legacy ==
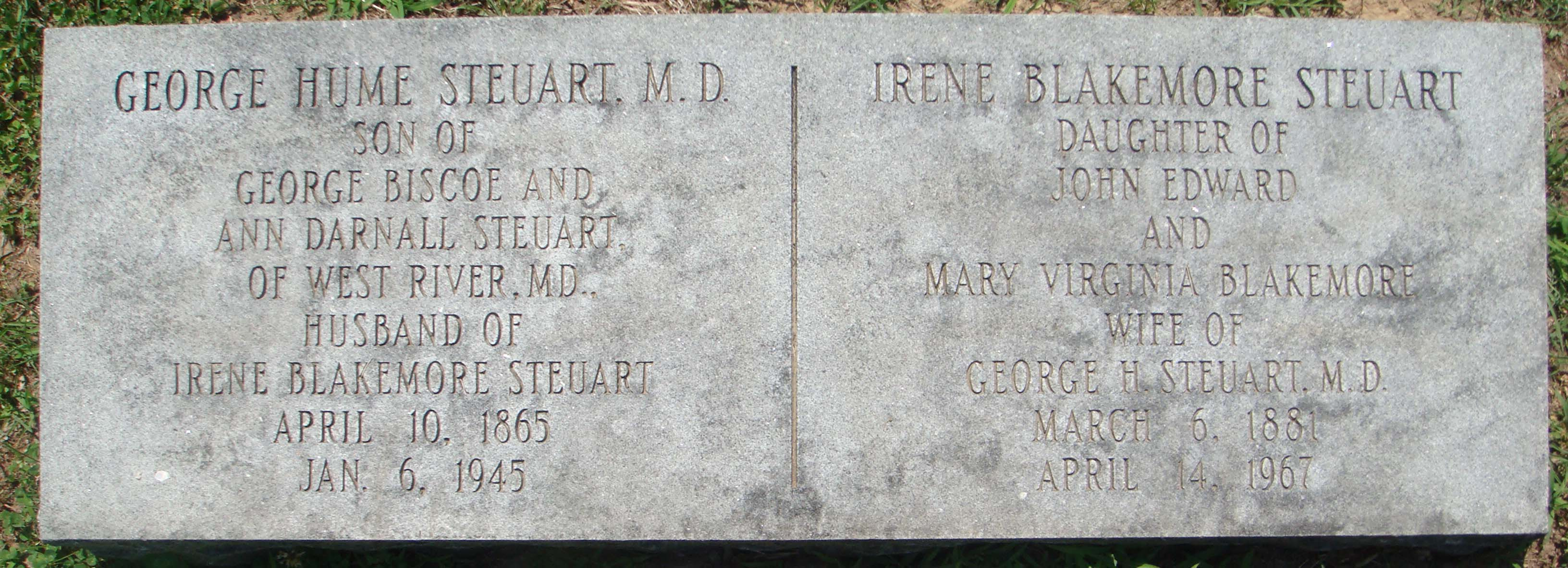
Gravestone of George H. Steuart and Irene Blakemore

Steuart died of heart complications on the morning of January 6, 1945, age 79. He was survived by wife Irene and his two children: Mrs Eyjolf Bjornsson of Denver, Colorado and George Hume Steuart, who became a diplomat in the US Foreign Service. He is buried in the churchyard of St. Mary's, Whitechapel in Virginia.
