= Foxwell =

Foxwell is a surname. Notable people with the surname include:

- Herbert Foxwell (1849–1936), English economist
- Ivan Foxwell (1914–2002), British screenwriter and film producer
- Lady Edith Foxwell (1918–1996) "The Queen of London Cafe Society" and wife of Ivan
- William Foxwell Albright (1891–1971) American scholar
- Herbert Sydney Foxwell (1890–1943) cartoon illustrator
- Owen Foxwell (born 2003), Australian basketballer

== Fictional characters ==
- Ffion Foxwell, a character in Black Mirror
- Liam Foxwell, a character in Black Mirror

== See also ==
- Foxell
- Foxwells, Virginia US community
