= Westland =

Westland or Westlands may refer to:

== Places ==
- Westlands, Nairobi, an affluent neighbourhood in the city of Nairobi, Kenya
- Westlands Constituency, an electoral constituency in Kenya
- Westlands, Staffordshire, a suburban area and ward in Newcastle-under-Lyme, England
- Westlands, Worcestershire, a location in England
- Westland, a peninsula of the Shetland Mainland near Vaila, Scotland

=== Netherlands ===
- Westland (municipality), Netherlands
- Westland (region), Netherlands

=== New Zealand ===
- Westland District, a political subdivision on the West Coast of New Zealand's South Island
- Westland Tai Poutini National Park, a national park
  - Informally, the name often used for the entire West Coast region, of which the Westland District is a part
  - Westland (New Zealand electorate) a former parliamentary electorate in the above area
  - Westland Province, a province of New Zealand from 1873–76

=== United States ===
- Westland, Indiana
- Westland, Michigan
- Westland, Oregon; see McKay Reservoir
- Westland, Pennsylvania
- Westland, Virginia
- Westland Mall (Hialeah), a shopping mall in Hialeah, Florida
- Westland Mansion, the retirement home of U.S. president Grover Cleveland
- Westland Middle School, in Bethesda, Maryland

== Aircraft ==
- Westland Aircraft, a British aircraft manufacturer, which merged and became:
  - Westland Helicopters, a British helicopter manufacturer, in 1961
  - AgustaWestland, a British/Italian helicopter manufacturer, following a further merger in 2000
  - Leonardo S.p.A., an Italian helicopter manufacturer, following a further merger in 2016
- Westland affair, a 1986 British political crisis stemming from the government's ownership of Westland Aircraft

== Other ==
- Westland (Nazi propaganda), the planned Nazi German name for the occupied Netherlands, or the unit of Dutch SS soldiers in Russia
- Westland School (disambiguation)
- The Westland, a Western Australian named train service
- The Westland (periodical), an Australian railway magazine published by Rail Heritage WA
- Westland Books

== See also ==
- West Country
- Vestlandet or Western Norway
