= George H. Steuart (diplomat) =

American diplomat

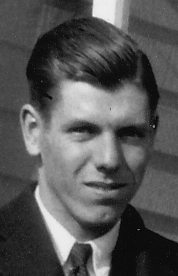
- George H. Steuart, c1920s
- Born: November 3, 1907; Ottoman, Virginia
- Died: September 19, 1998 (aged 90); Falls Church, Virginia
- Occupations: Consul, Foreign Service
- Employer: United States Government
- Known for: Consulate of the United States, Liverpool
- Spouse: Lois DeCamps
- Parents: George H. Steuart father; Virginia Irene Blakemore, mother

George H. Steuart (November 3, 1907 – September 19, 1998) was an American diplomat and Foreign Service officer, and one of the last consuls of the United States of America in Liverpool, England. He was a major benefactor of the Mary Ball Washington Museum and Library in Lancaster, Virginia, donating by deed of gift the Steuart Blakemore Building, formerly known as the Old Post Office.

== Biography ==
=== Early life and family ===
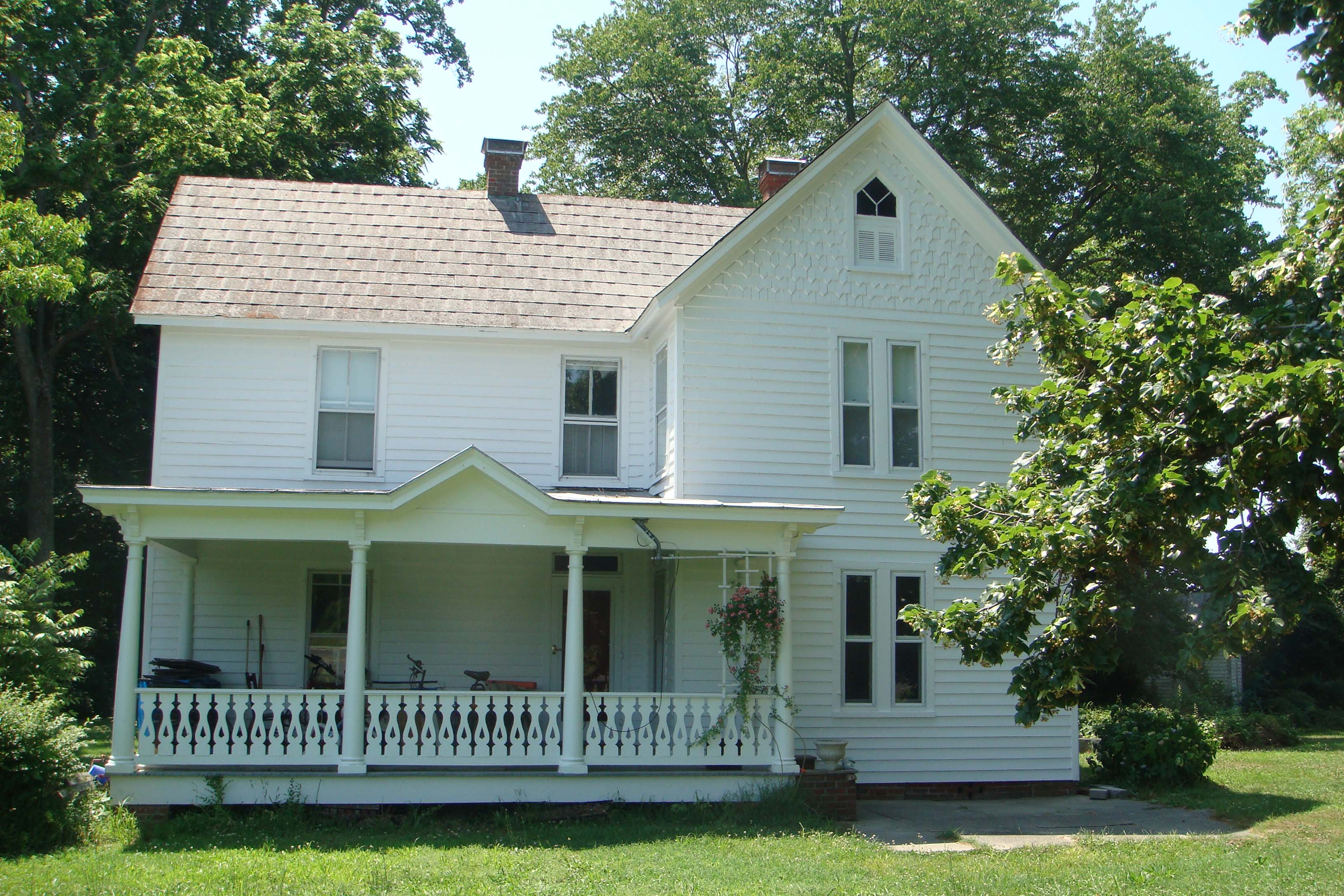
Steuart's birthplace in Ottoman, Virginia

Steuart was born in Ottoman, Virginia, on November 3, 1907, the son of physician George H. Steuart, and Irene Blakemore. Steuart married Lois Sykes Decamps, of Anderson, South Carolina, daughter of Christie Jean Baptiste DeCamps and Lois Catherine Sykes, on May 28, 1938, in Wallacetown, Virginia. They were married for 53 years, and had four daughters: Catherine Steuart (b. 1941), Elizabeth Steuart, Ann Steuart and Darnall Steuart, who served as an economic counselor with the United States Embassy in Caracas, Venezuela.

=== Career ===
Steuart attended Johns Hopkins University in Baltimore, and began his career in public service with the Works Progress Administration (WPA) and the National Youth Administration.

During World War II, he was chief of accounting administration with the Board of Economic Warfare, after which he served in Cairo, Egypt, with the Foreign Economic Administration.

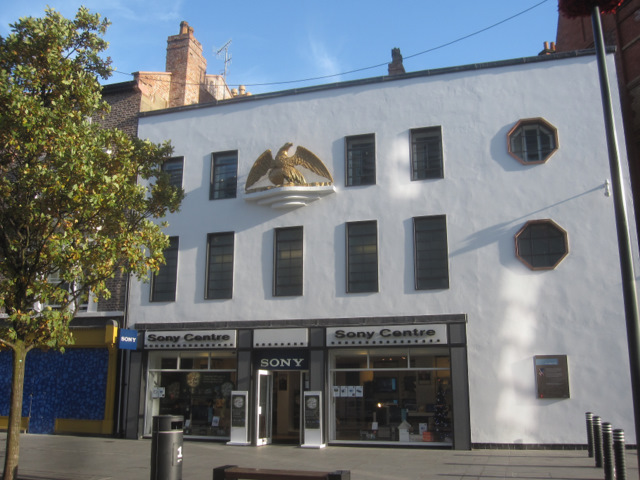
Former United States Consulate, Liverpool.

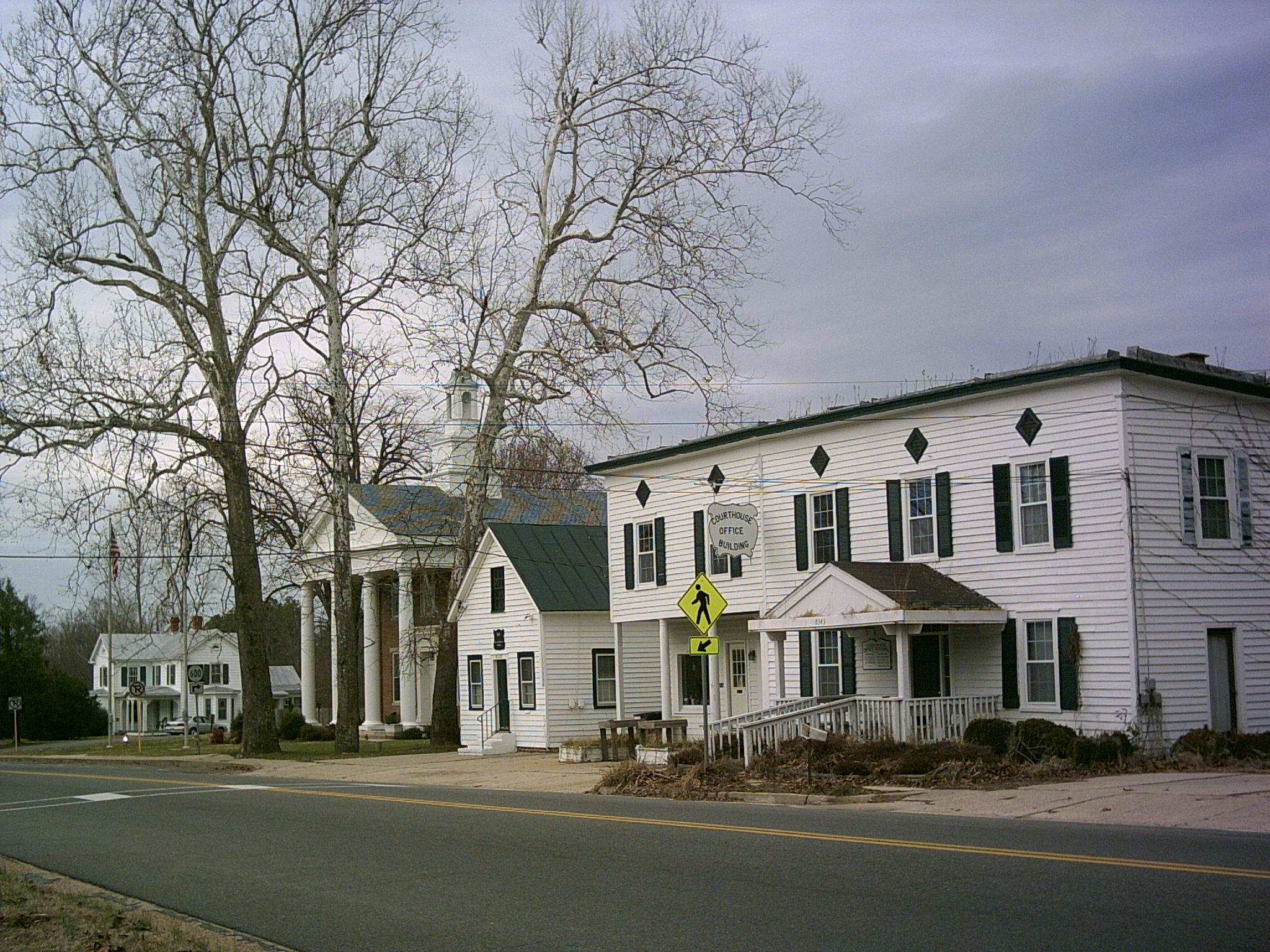
View of the Mary Ball Washington Museum and Library, including Lancaster Courthouse and the Steuart Blakemore Building, donated to the museum by Steuart in 1986.

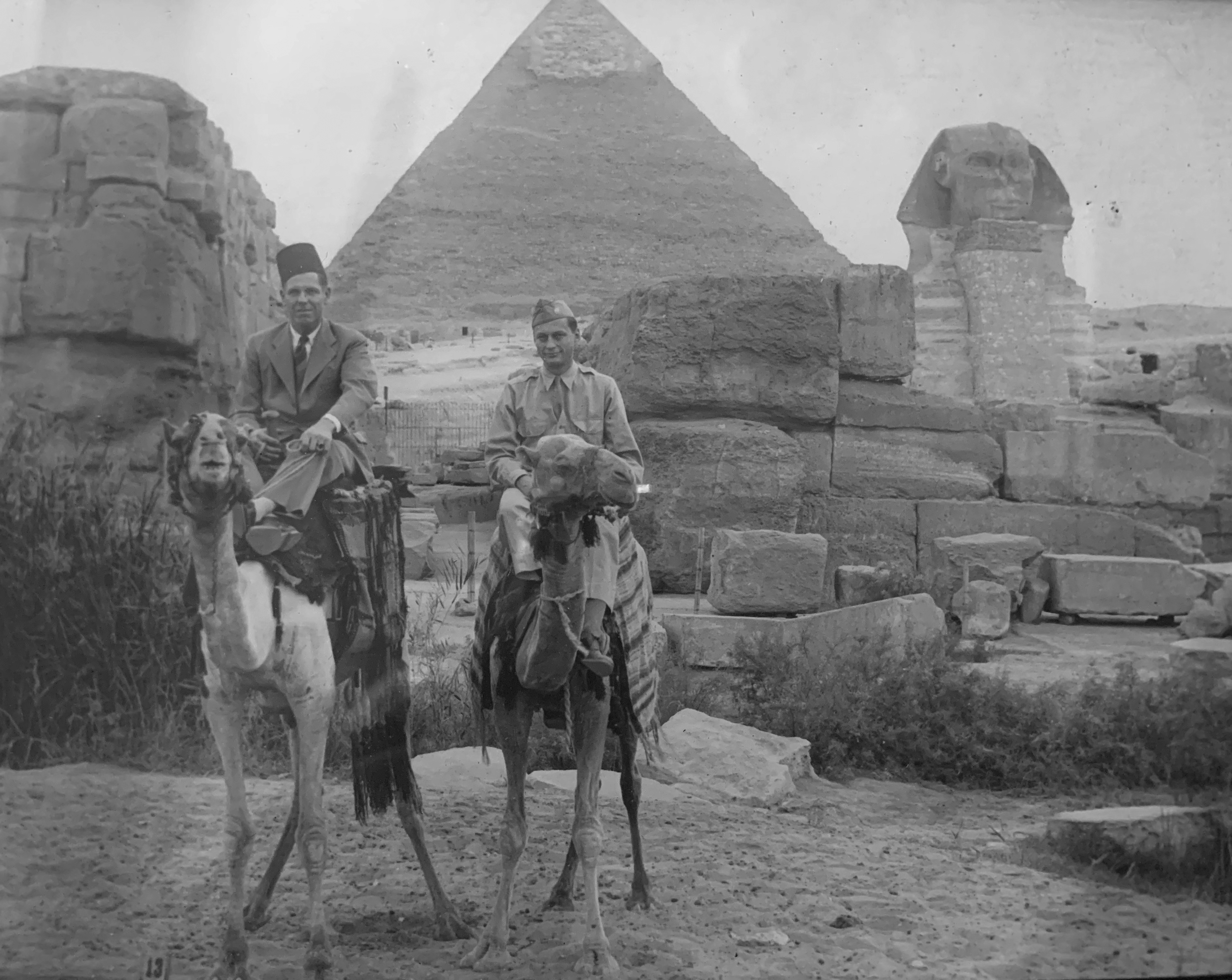
George H. Steuart in Cairo, Egypt, 1944, with Henry van Zile Hyde MD

After the War, he joined the Foreign Service and was assigned to London, Geneva and Liverpool, where he became consul. The Liverpool consulate had been the first established by the then fledgling United States, opened in 1790 by the first consul, James Maury. At the time, Liverpool was an important center for transatlantic commerce with the former Thirteen Colonies.

The original consulate stood on the quayside of Steers Dock and the Pool of Liverpool. It was decorated with a huge bald eagle, a reassuring sign to American sailors and travelers arriving at the port. The building still stands, and has been recently restored by the City.

On 22 April 1964 Steuart was invited by the Liverpool Housing Committee to name the newly built public housing development known as John F. Kennedy Heights. The buildings were eventually demolished in 1999.

The consulate in Liverpool was Steuart's final posting. He retired from the Foreign Service in 1965, and became a business consultant with James Somerville Associates, and manager of the Washington office of Commonwealth Associates, an architectural and engineering firm.

=== Philanthropy ===
By a deed of gift executed on July 29, 1986, Steuart donated the Old Post Office building in Lancaster, Virginia, to the Mary Ball Washington Museum and Library in Lancaster, renaming the building the Steuart Blakemore Building in honor of his parents. It now constitutes one of the five historic buildings in the museum complex.

== Death and legacy ==
Steuart was a vestryman and usher at Immanuel Episcopal Church-on-the-Hill, Alexandria, Virginia, and died in Falls Church, Virginia, on 19 September 1998. He is buried in the churchyard of St. Mary's, Whitechapel in Lancaster.
