= St. Mary's, Whitechapel =

Historic church in Virginia, US

St Mary's Whitechapel
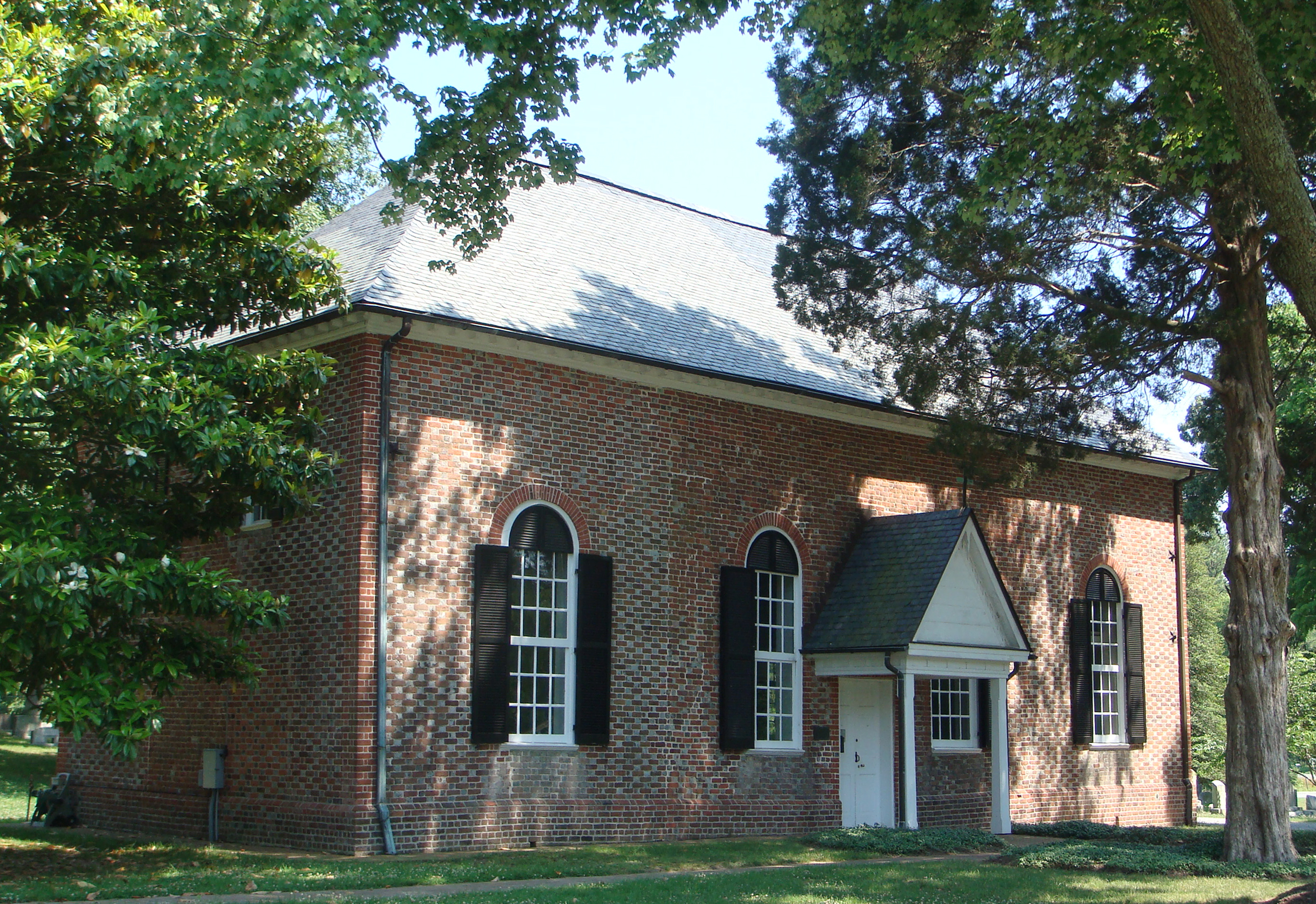
- photograph of St Mary's Whitechapel taken in 2009
- St Mary's Whitechapel
- Location: 5940 Whitechapel Road; Lancaster, Virginia
- Country: United States
- Denomination: Episcopal
- Website: www.stmaryswhitechapel.org

History
- Founded: 1669

Architecture
- Style: Colonial
- Years built: 1675

Administration
- Parish: St Mary's Whitechapel

Clergy
- Rector: The Rev. Canon Lynn Collins, Interim Rector
- St. Mary's Whitechapel
- U.S. National Register of Historic Places
- Virginia Landmarks Register
- Location within Virginia Location within the United States
- Nearest city: Lively, Virginia
- Coordinates: 37°44′32″N 76°32′53″W
- Area: 37 acres (15 ha)
- Built: 1675
- Architect: Jones, James
- NRHP reference No.: 69000254
- VLR No.: 051-0022

Significant dates
- Added to NRHP: November 12, 1969
- Designated VLR: September 9, 1969

St Mary's Whitechapel is an Episcopal church in Lancaster, Virginia, founded in 1669, and located three miles south of Lively, in Lancaster County, in the Northern Neck. The parish of St Mary's Whitechapel is notable for being the church of Mary Ball Washington, mother of George Washington, during her youth.

== History ==
In April 1657, the Colonial Assembly (General Court) divided the parish north of the Rappahannock River into two parishes: the upper becoming St. Mary's Whitechapel and the lower Christ Church (Lancaster County, Virginia). It is thought to have been named after Whitechapel parish in the East End of London. In 1752, the parishes were combined, but served by two separate buildings and vestries.

St. Mary's church is built in the simple elegant style typical of colonial era churches in Seventeenth Century Virginia. Construction of the building was begun in around 1675, pursuant to a bequest of David Fox, a planter who owned land surrounding the original parish. Population growth in the area led to expansion, transforming the original rectangular design to a cruciform shape in 1741, as both the building's north and south sides had wings added.

Following disestablishment, when Anglican churches closed all across America, the church became dormant and was abandoned for two decades. Along with numerous other parish properties, the church and its property were seized after a vacancy under a statute of 1802 ultimately upheld by the Virginia Court of Appeals. The church fell into disuse for twenty years, and during this period the interior was gutted and the church's east and west sections deteriorated beyond repair. Around 1830 the North and South wings were repaired, forming the rectangular structure which can be seen today, albeit at right angles to the original rectangular building.

The parish's earliest artifact is a silver chalice bequeathed by David Fox Sr. in 1669. Inside the church, the Decalogue, or Ten Commandments plaque, dates from a David Fox bequest recorded in 1702. On either side, the Apostles' Creed and the Lord's Prayer plaques were both bequeathed by William Fox in 1710, and William Fox also donated a baptismal font in 1718. Such are collectively thought to be the oldest in the state.

After the church was reestablished in 1832 (in commemoration of which Rawleigh William Dowman donated a Bible) until 1970, nineteen ministers served both St. Mary's parish and Christ Church parish in Lancaster, and sometimes as many as six parishes simultaneously, often including 19th century foundations Grace Church and Trinity Episcopal Church in Lancaster. In 1973 the Diocese of Virginia recognized St. Mary's Whitechapel and Trinity Episcopal in Lancaster jointly as an independent parish, and both churches have continued to share a rector since. The pulpit dates from 1979 and the organ from 1984.

== Cemetery ==
The church cemetery contains the graves of numerous members of local families, including many members of the Ball family, kin to Mary Ball Washington, mother of George Washington. The earliest marked grave is that of "John Stretchley, gentleman, 1698".

Among notable burials are the physician George H. Steuart, his son George H. Steuart (one of the last consuls of the United States at Liverpool, England), the actress Margaret Sullavan and former state Delegate Robert O. Norris Jr.

== St Mary's Whitechapel today ==
The church has an active congregation of the Episcopal church. The Interim Rector is the Rev. Canon Lynn Collins.

The church is listed in the National Register of Historic Places.

== See also ==
- National Register of Historic Places listings in Lancaster County, Virginia
