= Foxell =

Foxell is a surname. Notable people with the surname include:

- Clive Foxell (1930–2016), English physicist and author
- Maurice Foxell (1888–1981), British clergyman, artist and author

== See also ==
- Foxwell
