= Chesapeake Bank =

Community bank based in Virginia, US

- Company type: community bank
- Traded as: OTCQB: CPKF
- Industry: Banking
- Founded: 1900
- Headquarters: Kilmarnock, Virginia
- Key people: Jeff Szyperski (President)
- Products: Financial services
- Parent: Chesapeake Financial Shares Inc.
- Website: chesbank.com

Chesapeake Bank is a United States community bank based in Kilmarnock, Virginia. It provide banking services in the Northern Neck, Middle Peninsula, Greater Williamsburg area, and Richmond in Virginia.

== History ==
The bank was originally created as Lancaster National Bank (of Lancaster, Virginia) and later merged with Chesapeake Banking Company of Lively in 1968 to become Chesapeake National Bank. In 1994, Chesapeake National Bank dropped the "National" from its name, and has been known ever since as "Chesapeake Bank". It is not to be confused with the Baltimore-based Chesapeake Bank of Maryland.

== Operations ==
=== Service Region ===
Chesapeake Bank operates in the following areas of Virginia—the Northern Neck, Middle Peninsula, Greater Williamsburg area, and Richmond. The bank will expand into Chesterfield in May 2020.

=== Lines of Business ===
In addition to the traditional banking business, Chesapeake Bank also operates secondary lines of business, Chesapeake Wealth Management, Chesapeake Payment Systems, and Cash Flow divisions.

=== Notes ===
- Chesapeake Bank president Jeff Szyperski served the American Bankers Association as the organization's 2018–19 chairman. His tenure included visits with world leaders and presentations to banking groups all around the world. Szyperski is also an advocate for community banks nationally.
- In the 1960s, Chesapeake Bank was known for their Boat 'n Bank, which was a mobile branch which had its home port at Carter's Creek Marina in Irvington.
- Staff from Chesapeake Bank are encouraged to volunteer in their home region, and do so throughout the year
- Chesapeake Bank was listed as a Best Bank to Work For in 2020 by American Banker.
