= Westland School =

Westland School or Westlands School may refer to:

- The Westland School (Los Angeles), a private elementary school in Los Angeles, California, United States
- Westlands School, Sittingbourne, a secondary school in Sittingbourne, Kent, England
- Westland High School, a high school in Galloway, Ohio, United States
- Westland Middle School, a middle school in Bethesda, Maryland, United States
- Westlands School, a secondary school in Torquay, Devon, England now called The Spires College

== See also ==
- Westland (disambiguation)
