= Westland, Virginia =

Unincorporated community in Virginia, United States

- Unincorporated community
- Location in Virginia Location in the United States
- Coordinates: 37°37′1″N 76°17′34″W
- Country: United States
- State: Virginia
- County: Lancaster
- Time zone: UTC−5 (Eastern (EST))
  - Summer (DST): UTC−4 (EDT)
- Area code: 804

Westland is an unincorporated community in Lancaster County in the U. S. state of Virginia.

It is adjacent to Foxwells, on a peninsula north of the outlet of the Rappahannock River into Chesapeake Bay.
