= Grace Church (Kilmarnock, Virginia) =

Historic church in Virginia, US

Coordinates: 37°42′23″N 76°22′45″W

Grace Church Kilmarnock
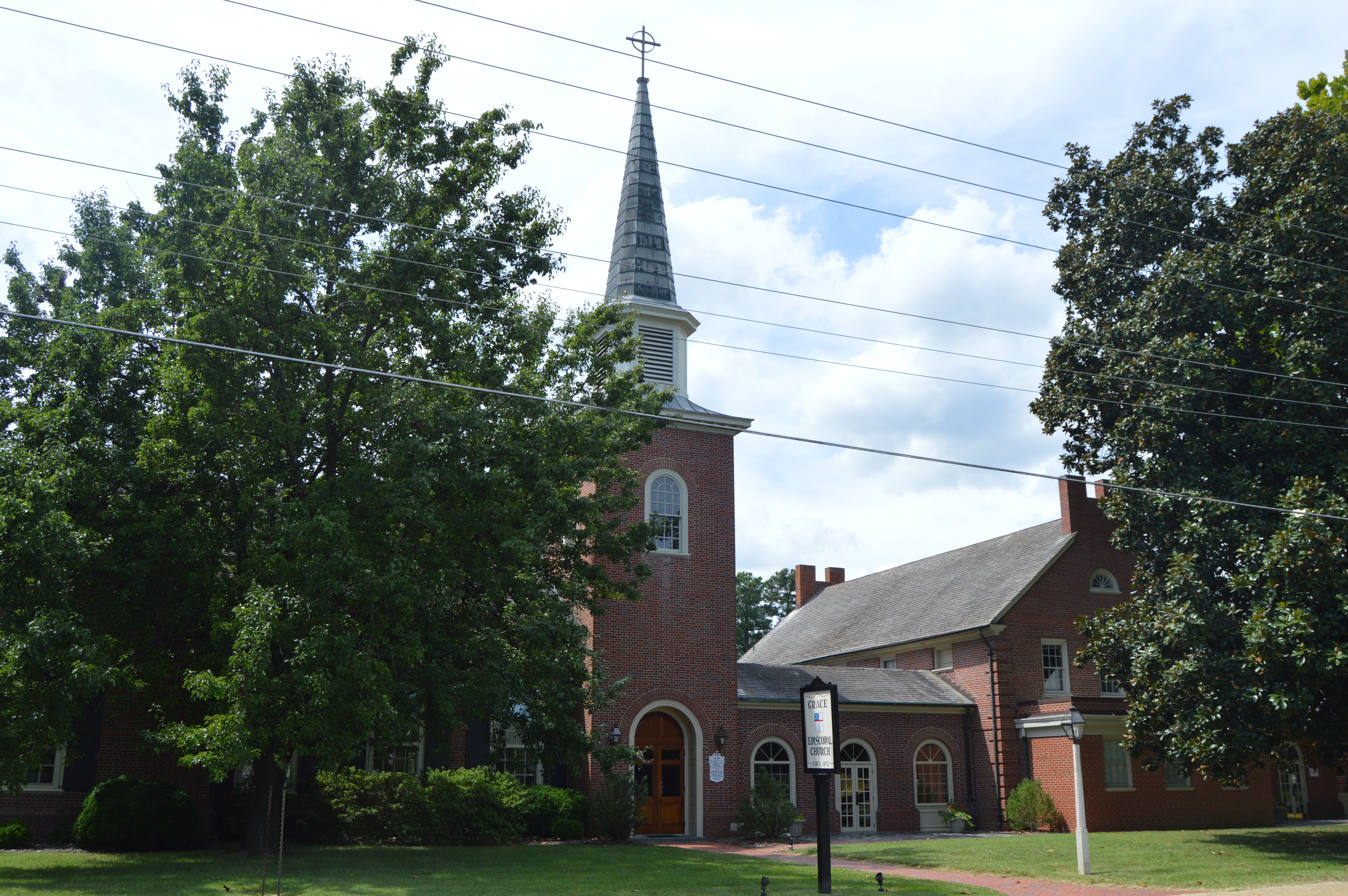
- Facade
- Grace Church Kilmarnock
- Location: 303 South Main Street; Kilmarnock, Virginia 22482
- Country: United States
- Denomination: Episcopal
- Website: http://www.graceepiscopalkilmarnock.com

History
- Founded: 1852

Architecture
- Style: Colonial
- Years built: 1855

Administration
- Diocese: Episcopal Diocese of Virginia
- Parish: Grace Episcopal Church, Kilmarnock

Clergy
- Rector: Kimberly Baker Glenn; Associate Rector, Jeff Patnaude

Grace Church of Kilmarnock, Lancaster County, Virginia, is the largest rural Episcopal church in the Commonwealth.

== History ==
The original brick building, the town's first church and now a chapel attached to the current church, was consecrated by assistant bishop John Johns in 1852. At that and some other times, Grace Church shared a single rector with historic Christ Church (founded 1670), St. Mary's Church Whitechapel (founded 1669), and/or Trinity Church in Lancaster.

The current sanctuary was dedicated by Bishop Goodwin in 1959, and an arcade connects it with the old church, now a chapel. In 1988, Bishop Peter James Lee consecrated the enlarged Grace House. Further expansion occurred in 2002.

In 2017, the church building was listed on the National Register of Historic Places.
