= Locustville (Ottoman, Virginia) =

Historic house in Virginia, United States

- U.S. National Register of Historic Places
- Virginia Landmarks Register
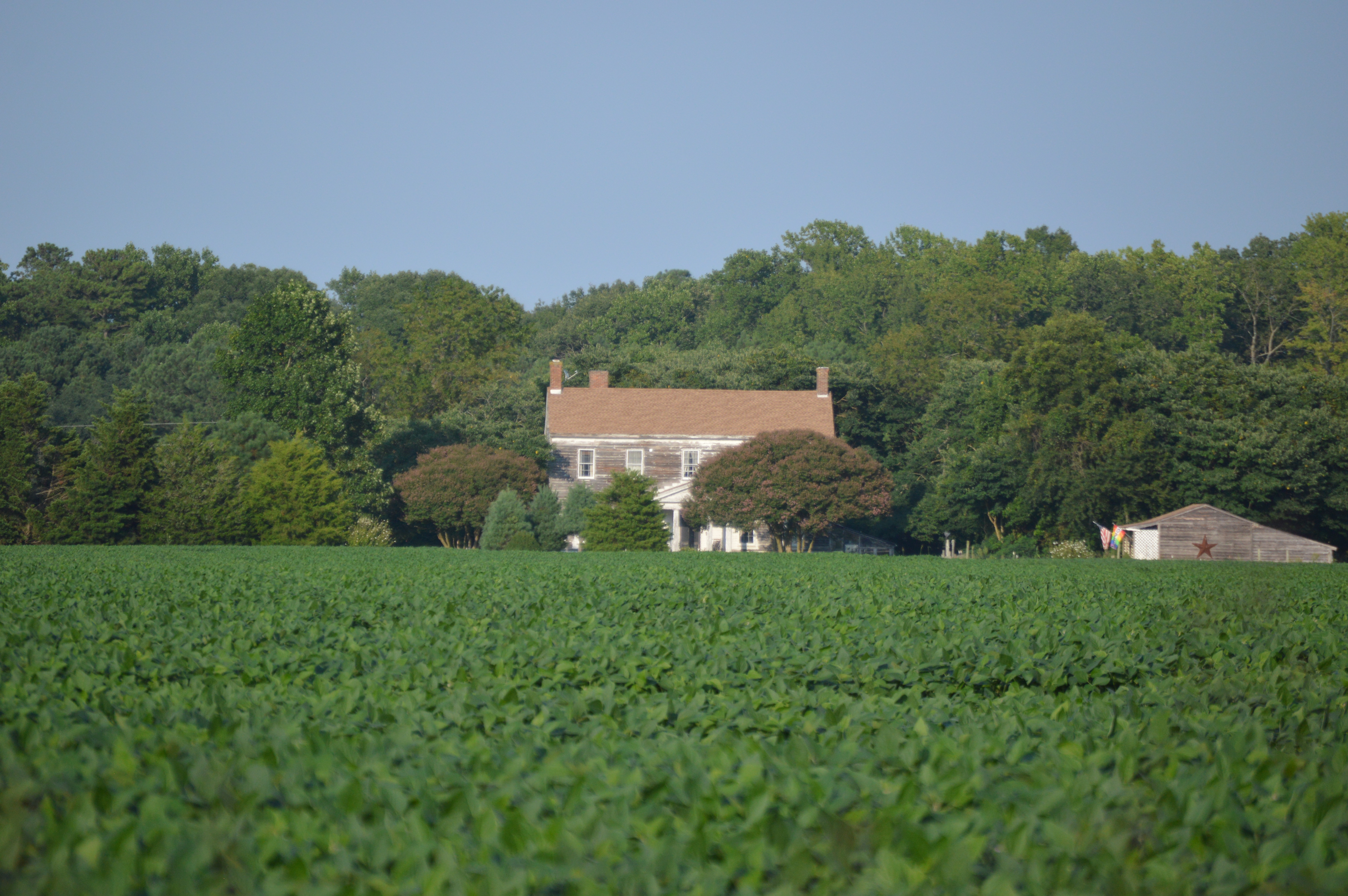
- Distant view from the west

- Location within Virginia Location within the United States
- Location: Slabtown Road, near Ottoman, Virginia
- Coordinates: 37°40′53″N 76°30′13″W
- Area: 6.1 acres (2.5 ha)
- Built: 1855
- Built by: F.A. Pierce
- Architectural style: Greek Revival
- NRHP reference No.: 94001239
- VLR No.: 051-0050

Significant dates
- Added to NRHP: October 21, 1994
- Designated VLR: August 17, 1994

Locustville is a historic plantation house located near Ottoman, Lancaster County, Virginia. It was built in 1855, and is a two-story, five-bay, gable roofed Greek Revival style frame dwelling. It has a central passage plan and two interior end chimneys. There is a rear ell which also has an interior end chimney. It features a front porch with large Doric order fluted columns.

It was listed on the National Register of Historic Places in 1994.
