= Corotoman =

Historic house in Virginia, United States

- U.S. National Register of Historic Places
- Virginia Landmarks Register
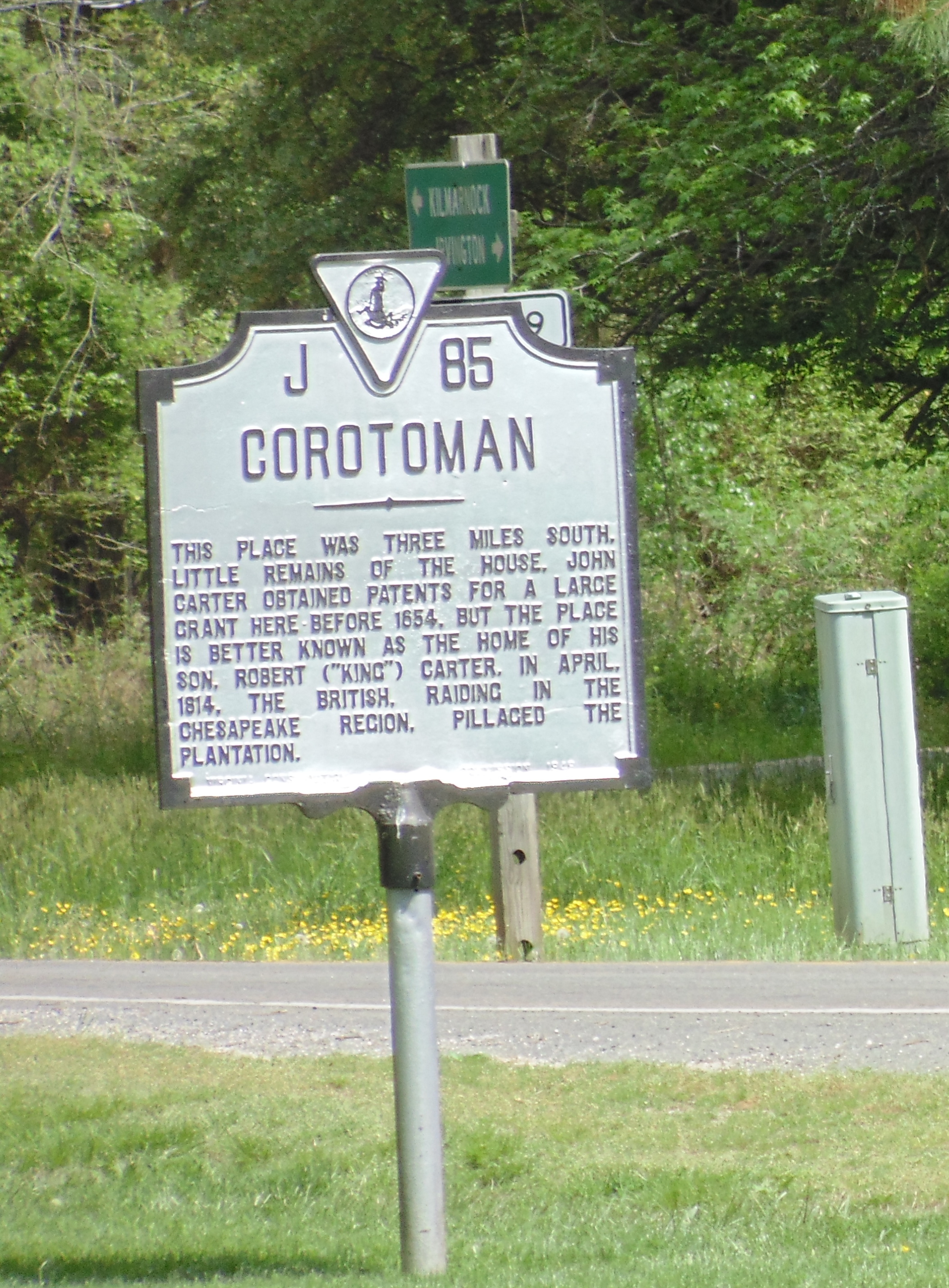
- Historic marker denoting the location of the home

- Location within Virginia
- Location: Address Restricted; Weems, Virginia
- Coordinates: 37°39′17″N 76°26′38″W
- Area: 160 acres (65 ha)
- Built: 1650–1699, 1700s
- Architectural style: Georgian
- NRHP reference No.: 70000805
- VLR No.: 051-0034

Significant dates
- Added to NRHP: September 15, 1970
- Designated VLR: December 2, 1969

Corotoman was a 17th and 18th century plantation on the Rappahannock River in Lancaster County, Virginia, United States. Corotoman was the residence of Robert Carter I (1662/63 – 4 August 1732), a colonial Governor of Virginia and one of the wealthiest men in the Thirteen Colonies of North America. Corotoman was located on a point overlooking the Rappahannock River, and flanked by Carter's Creek and Corrotoman River to its east and west respectively.

== History ==
=== Earliest inhabitants ===
Corotoman was first inhabited by the Cuttatwomen Native American tribe several hundred years before the arrival of English colonists to Lancaster County, Virginia.

=== John Carter I ===
John Carter I, the patriarch of the Carter family of Virginia, purchased and settled Corotoman between 1652 and 1653. Carter developed and improved the lands into a plantation and constructed the first structures on the property before his death in 1669. Carter's mansion, known as the "Old House", was built in the typical 17th century hall-parlor plan with a porch chamber.

=== John Carter II ===
When his father died in 1670, John Carter Jr. inherited Corotoman, the family's main plantation, as the eldest son. John Carter Jr. died in 1690, possibly of malaria contracted three years earlier. His will also provided that his brother Robert Carter would receive the mill and other real estate if John's daughter Elizabeth did not have children—and in fact she died of measles in November 1693, shortly after her marriage to the son of Richmond County burgess (and Colonel) William Lloyd, and that estate became subject to litigation.

=== Robert Carter I ===
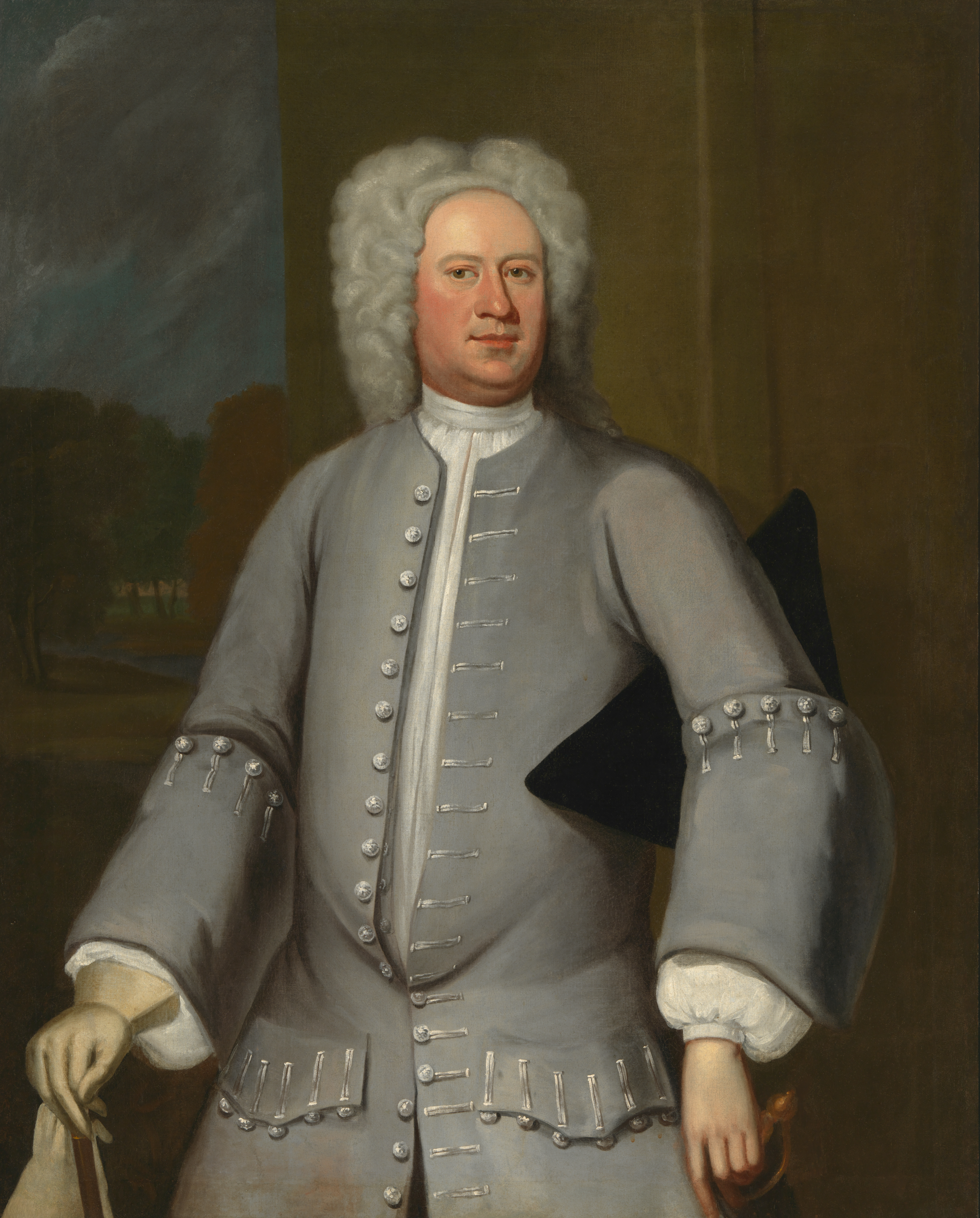
Portrait of Robert "King" Carter, c. 1720

Corotoman was then inherited by John Carter Jr.'s brother Robert Carter I (whose wealth and autocratic business methods led to his becoming known by the nickname "King") in 1690. Under Robert Carter I's ownership, Corotoman became the center of what developed into a 300,000-acre (1,200 km^{2}) estate of 48 plantations and farms, including the settlements of Indian Town and Hills Quarters.

==== Construction ====
Robert Carter began construction of the large Georgian plantation house at Corotoman around 1720. The house was completed in 1725 and introduced a new era for early 18th-century architecture in Virginia. Corotoman also set the pattern for 18th-century architectural patronage. The mansion at Corotoman rivaled the other important Colonial mansions of Virginia and affirmed Robert Carter I's status as the most powerful planter in the aristocracy of the Tidewater region. Carter's correspondence and diary reveal that the construction of the mansion at Corotoman was a lengthy, complex, and frustrating endeavor. Construction materials for the mansion included paving stones from England, lumber from his plantation saw mills and from neighboring plantations, and oyster shells for mortar. For some of the mansion's windows, Carter used iron casement frames for quarrel glass. To undertake the mansion's construction, Carter imported skilled indentured servants from England and hired local craftsmen.

==== Gardens ====
Carter employed an English gardener, whom he instructed to "bring the yards" around the mansion into closer accord with the architectural rhythms of the mansion. Little is currently known of the garden's contents and design.

==== Brick House Store ====
At Corotoman, Carter maintained a building known as the "Brick House Store" where he kept imported goods that he sold and bartered to local planters. In 1730, an inventory of items at the Brick House Store included essential supplies such as cloths, tools, and gunpowder, and luxury items such as spices, ivory combs, and brass candlesticks.

==== Spinster's House ====
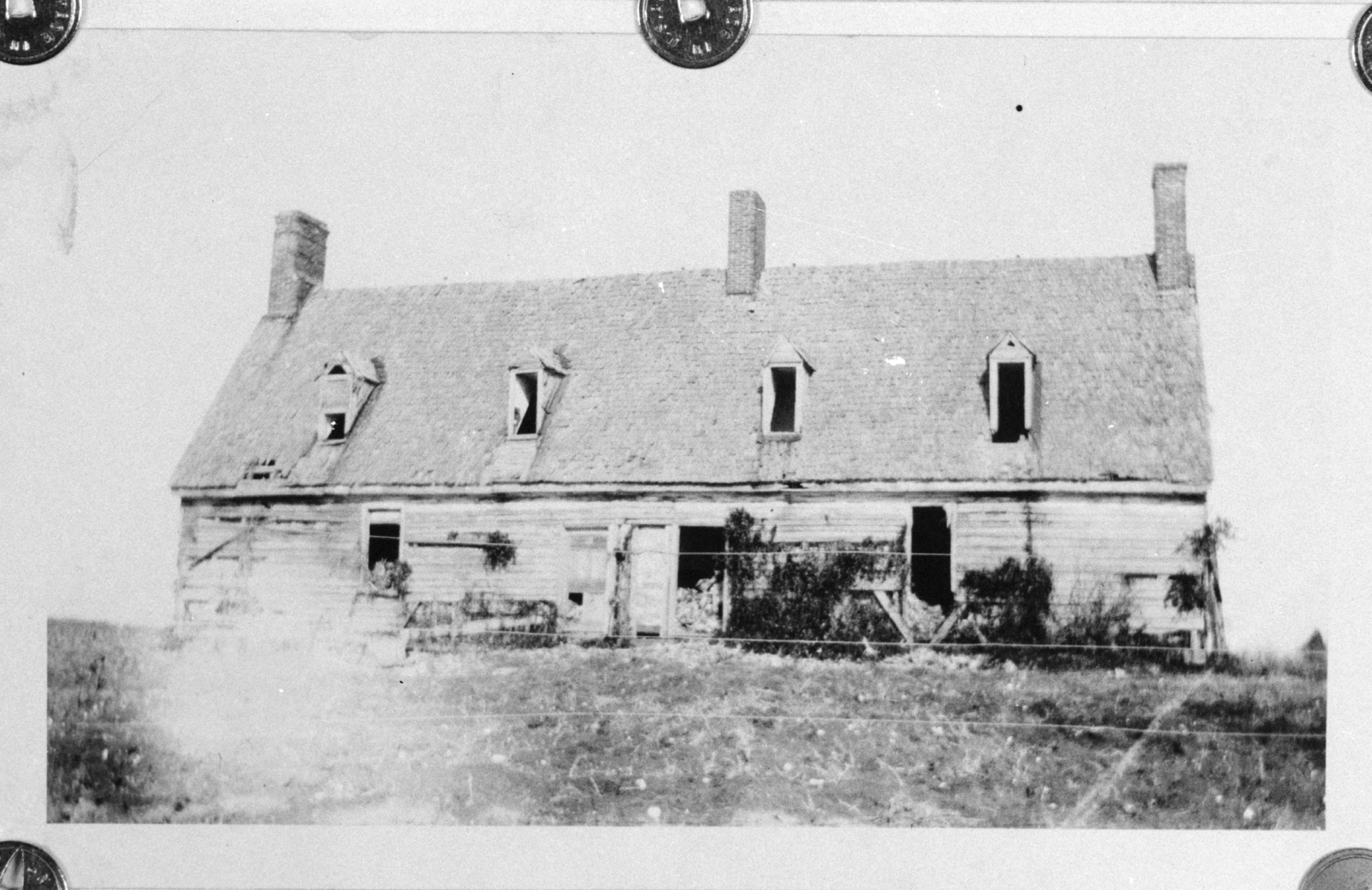
The "Spinster's House" at Corotoman in the early 20th century.

Another supporting structure at Corotoman was known as the "Spinster's House." The house was constructed in either the late 17th century or the early 18th century. It was a one-story and a half frame house adorned with a gabled roof with large end chimneys. It lay in ruins for years before finally disappearing around 1930. Before its disappearance, the Spinster's House was the last remaining supporting structure of the original Corotoman plantation.

==== Destruction ====
In 1729, four years after "King" Carter's mansion was completed, a fire destroyed it. Carter made little mention of the mansion fire in his diary, but he did lament the total destruction of his wine cellar. Carter died three years later, and the mansion was not rebuilt. An inventory taken in 1732 after Carter's death implies that after the fire, Carter resided in either the "Old House" or the "Spinster's House" at Corotoman rather than rebuild the big house, because of fiscal difficulties or ill health. In the mid-19th century, Corotoman and its adjacent lands passed out of the Carter family when they were sold by a granddaughter of Charles Carter.

==== Escape of Enslaved Persons During the War of 1812 ====
69 Corotoman slaves fled to British ships anchored in the Chesapeake Bay during the War of 1812. The flight occurred on two days in April 1814. On the 18th, three young enslaved men from Corotoman – Tom Saunders, Ezekiel Loney, and Canada Baton – left with a party of British marines who had come ashore on a nearby estate to carry off provisions. Three days later the British returned at midnight directly to Corotoman, quite certainly led there by the three young men. They left with 66 more slaves, mainly women and children. This was the largest group of slaves to flee to the British from any Virginia estate during the War.

=== Later plantation house ===
A new mansion was rebuilt at Corotoman by the owners who succeeded Robert Carter, but it was destroyed by fire around 1900.

In Spring 2000, the Association for the Preservation of Virginia Antiquities acquired the site of Corotoman.

== Architecture ==
Robert Carter I's 1725 Georgian mansion was a two-story brick dwelling with a two-story porch, which Carter referred to as a piazza. The mansion measured 90 by 40 feet (12 m). Its central entrance hall was paved in black and white marble brought to Virginia from England. The entrance hall was flanked by Carter's bedchamber and a lavishly decorated parlor, both with large closets. Along the mansion's façade against the Rappahannock River ran a gallery. Below the gallery was an arcade and three pavilions.

While the mansion was destroyed by fire four years after its completion, the "Spinster's House" on the Corotoman estate survived until around 1930.

== Archaeology ==
In 1978, archaeologists led by Dr. Carter Hudgins and the Virginia Department of Historic Resources excavated the foundations of Robert Carter I's Georgian mansion at Corotoman. The archaeology undertaken also confirmed a single-pile house of 40 by 90 feet (27 m) including a loggia that measured 10 by 90 feet (27 m). The mansion's foundations were found to be 30 inches (760 mm) thick. Considerable rubble was unearthed at Corotoman, including white marble pavers, fragments of dressed stone and rubbed brick, Delft tile, Chinese porcelain, tankards, and over 1,000 wine bottles. Artifacts unearthed at Corotoman are currently displayed at the Christ Church museum.

== See also ==
- Christ Church (Lancaster County, Virginia)
- Weems, Virginia
