= Henry van Zile Hyde =

American physician (1906–1982)

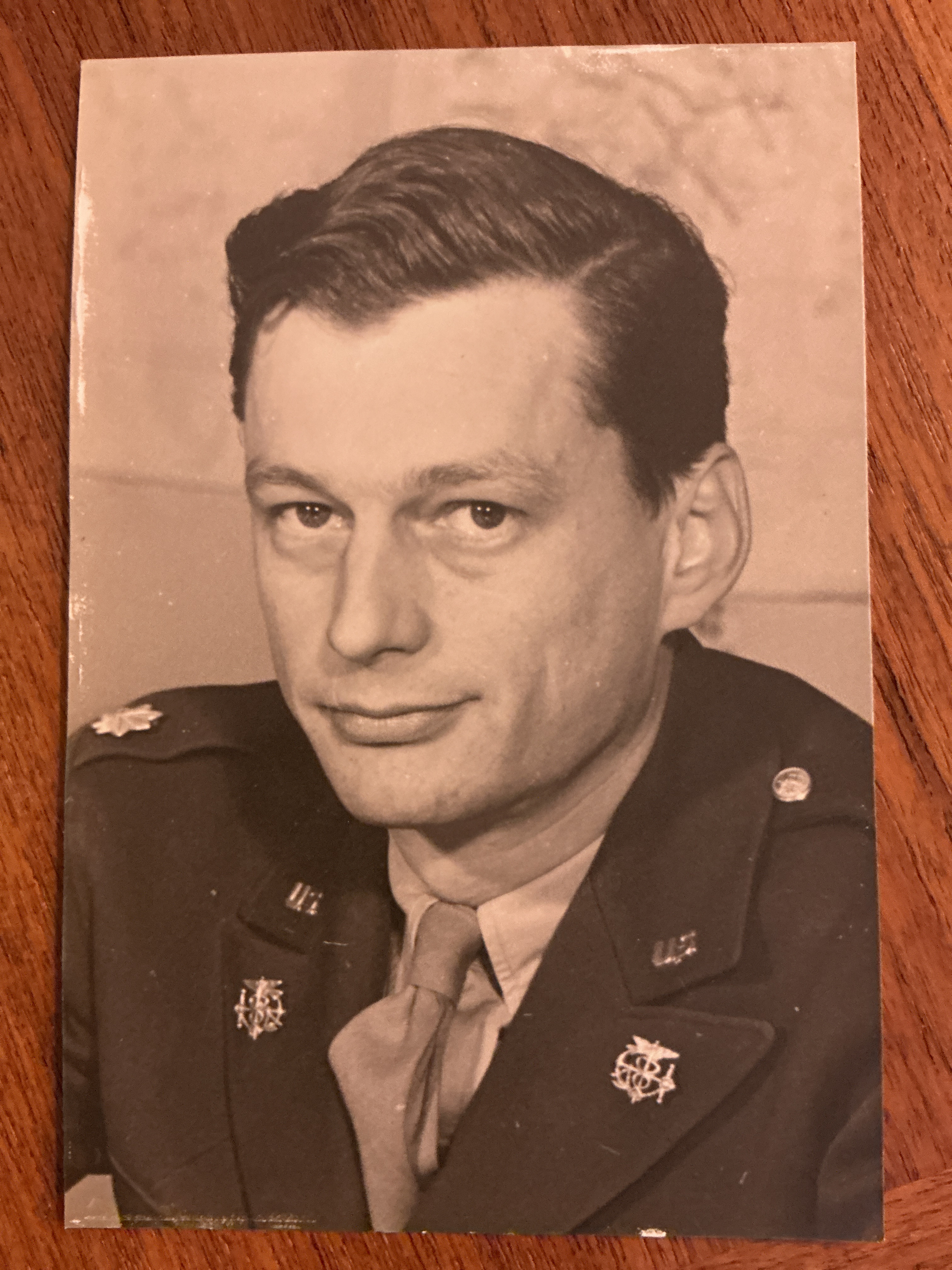
Henry van Zile Hyde, 1945

Henry van Zile Hyde (March 3, 1906 – November 5, 1982) was an American physician and public health official appointed by three presidents to represent the United States in the World Health Organization (WHO) from its inception in 1948 until his retirement in 1962.

== Family, education, and early career ==
Hyde was born on March 3, 1906, into a prominent Syracuse, New York, family. He was the second son of Henry Neal Hyde, an Episcopal priest, and Madeleine van Zile. Hyde graduated from Deerfield Academy in 1925 and from Yale University in 1929. He was a 1933 Phi Beta Kappa graduate of Johns Hopkins University Medical School, where he was also elected to Alpha Omega Alpha, the medical honor society. Soon after graduating from medical school, on June 24, 1933, Hyde married Ellen Sedgwick Tracy, also from a prominent Syracuse family.

Hyde served his medical internship at the Johns Hopkins Hospital in Baltimore, Maryland, and his residency in internal and pulmonary medicine at Strong Memorial Hospital at the University of Rochester in Rochester, New York. In 1936 he established a practice of internal medicine in Syracuse. In 1938 he received a diploma from the Trudeau Institute, a center for the study and treatment of tuberculosis in Saranac Lake, New York. Hyde was a diplomate of the American Board of Internal Medicine and the American Board of Preventive Medicine.

During his first years in medical practice, Hyde was also engaged in pneumonia research for a New York state program, at a time when there was no known cure for pneumonia and when many people succumbed to the disease. Hyde’s work came to the attention of the state health department, and in early 1941 he was appointed chief of the New York State Bureau of Pneumonia Control in Albany, New York – his first venture into public health.

== World War II years ==
Hyde’s arrival in Albany in 1941 coincided with the advent of the American involvement in World War II. Within four months Hyde was recruited into the United States Public Health Service (USPHS), initially at the rank of commander and senior surgeon. He was assigned as the medical director for Region 2 of the Office of Civilian Defense (OCD), a wartime department with responsibilities now covered by the Departments of Homeland Security and Emergency Management. Region 2 encompassed the densely populated areas of New York City, New Jersey and Delaware. At the time, the United States feared an East Coast air or sea attack from German forces. At OCD, Hyde was responsible for all the emergency medical responses, as well as civilian preparedness, in such an event. Along with Eleanor Roosevelt, then the unsalaried assistant director of OCD. Hyde made presentations to medical and hospital professionals and community organizations about the urgency for preparations and the pressing problems surrounding their accomplishment.

In early 1943, at the request of James M. Landus, dean of the Harvard Law School on leave as director of OCD, Hyde went to Washington as chief of the Field Casualty Section. When it was determined that an imminent attack on the US homeland was low, Hyde was assigned to the Foreign Economic Administration and sent to Cairo, Egypt, to head the Medical Division of the Middle East Supply Centre (MESC). The MESC was “an Anglo-American agency that had complete control over the flow of civilian supplies to the Middle East. The Medical Division was concerned with medical and health supplies required by the twenty countries in that region.”

The director of MESC, with whom Hyde worked at that time, was Australian Commander Sir Robert G. A. Jackson. When Jackson went to London to become senior deputy director of the United Nations Relief and Rehabilitation Administration (UNRRA) serving under Herbert Lehman and Fiorello La Guardia, Hyde became chief of the Middle East office of UNRRA. Hyde’s office was responsible for all the refuge camps in the Gaza Strip, the Sinai and North Africa, together totaling over 80,000 refugees from Greece and Yugoslavia. These civilians had been evacuated as part of the Allied ruse to have the Axis powers believe they were going to be invaded through the Balkans and not at the beaches of Normandy.

Hyde served in Cairo from March 1944 until the end of the war, flying home on VJ Day, August 14, 1945; in September of that year he returned to Washington, where he became assistant chief of the Health Services Bureau of the Department of State.

== World Health Organization ==
Between August and October 1944, the United States, the United Kingdom, the Soviet Union, and Nationalist China met at Dumbarton Oaks in Washington, D.C., where they agreed to establish the United Nations (UN) for the purpose of maintaining international peace. At the Dumbarton Oaks conference, these four international powers also agreed that the UN should address economic and social problems for which an Economic and Social Council (ECOSOC) of the UN would be responsible.

In April 1945, a 50-nation international conference was held in San Francisco to form the United Nations (UN). Delegates from several nations, including the US, noted that there was no specialized health agency included in the proposed UN Charter. Realizing that it was too late to have one included, Dr. Geraldo de Paula Sousa of the Brazilian delegation and Dr. Szeming Sze of the Chinese delegation managed to have a declaration inserted instead, recommending a specialized agency for international health.

At the ECOSOC’s inaugural meeting held on February 7, 1946, the delegates agreed to call an international health conference and to establish a Technical Preparatory Committee (TPC) to prepare for the meeting. Behind the scenes Thomas Parran, Surgeon General of the United States Public Health Service, assisted by Henry van Zile Hyde and Wilson Jameson, chief medical officer of the British Ministry of Health, engaged in a lengthy correspondence to decide whom to invite to the TPC. After working for the MESC, Hyde insisted that a Middle Eastern delegate be invited, a proposal with which his British colleagues did not initially agree. Hyde insisted, suggesting that Dr. Aly Tewfik Shousha, an Egyptian, be the representative, which was eventually accepted. Eventually, 16 international public health experts were invited to the TPC.

Thomas Parran represented the United States at the TPC meeting, with Henry van Zile Hyde as his alternate. The TPC met in Paris in March and April 1946. “In the course of only twenty-two meetings the Committee succeeded in drawing up an annotated agenda for the Health Conference, proposals – amounting to a draft – for a virtually complete constitution for the new health organization, and a series of relevant resolutions.” The World Health Organization was born.

During the TPC, and in particular the drafting of the WHO constitution, Hyde suggested including a preamble to the Constitution, which was accepted by the committee. Hyde wrote to his wife: “It [the preamble] presents 13 fundamental truths and I believe can become an Atlantic charter of health.” Andrija Stampar introduced the first draft preamble that was edited by the drafting committee, for which Hyde was the secretary. Working on the sub-committee for the preamble, Hyde collaborated closely with Brock Chisholm and Szeming Sze, who claimed authorship of the now very famous first principle, namely that “health is a state of complete physical, mental, and social well-being and not merely the absence of disease or infirmity.”

Three months after the Paris meetings, in June 1946, the International Health Conference was convened in New York with representatives of all fifty-one-member nations of the UN attending. Countries that were not yet members attended as observers, along with the Allied Control Authorities for Germany, Japan and Korea. The conference voted to accept the constitution as presented in the draft submitted by the TPC, with only relatively minor changes. Other important decisions were made in New York. Among them, an Interim Commission (IC) was set up to “make preparations for the First World Health Assembly, to carry on without interruption the surviving activities of the League of Nations Health Organization and those of the Office International d’Hygieve Publique (OIHP) and UNRRA, and to perform other urgent duties pending the final establishment of the Organization.”

Thomas Parran was designated a member of the IC with Hyde as his alternate. When Thomas Parran resigned as surgeon general in October 1947, Hyde took over Parran’s WHO responsibilities, leading the US delegation at the IC. The IC worked for two years until the first WHO Assembly met in July 1948.

On October 18, 1948, President Truman appointed Hyde the United States representative to the executive board of the WHO. The Senate subsequently confirmed the appointment. Hyde was reappointed to the board by President Eisenhower in 1953 and 1957, and by President Kennedy in 1961. He was chairman of the WHO executive board in 1954 and 1955, and eventually retired from his position with the WHO in 1962.

During Hyde’s tenure as the American representative to the WHO, he focused much of his attention on malaria eradication, with the idea that post-WWII states would develop more quickly with a healthy workforce. While some have argued that the WHO’s malaria campaigns in the 1950s were a form of Cold War politics, none of this discourse exists in any of Hyde’s published writings or personal letters. Hyde was intimately concerned with and disturbed by poverty and poverty-related illness, particularly in the developing world. International public health was not the means to a political end for Hyde. And with respect to Cold War politics, Hyde consistently fought with the US Congress to give money to the WHO without putting political restrictions on its members, including the Soviet Union. Hyde even petitioned Secretary of State James F. Byrnes in 1946 to establish a formal U.S. policy statement on this matter (which Byrnes apparently denied).

During the 16 years in which Hyde represented the United States at the WHO, he also held other positions in the State Department and USPHS: he was assistant chief of the Division of International Labor, Social and Health Affairs for the Department of State (1945–1948); assistant chief of the Division of International Health of the USPHS (1948–1949); division director for health and sanitation at the Institute of Inter-American Affairs (1950–1952); director of health and sanitation at the Technical Cooperation Administration (1952–1953); assistant to the surgeon general for international health (1953–1958); from 1958 to 1962, served as director of the division of International Health at the USPHS.

== Political missions to communist states: the USSR and Cuba ==
In 1949, with the Cold War gathering speed and for various political reasons, the USSR resigned its membership in the WHO, not to return again until 1956. The return was due largely to the post-Stalin era warming in international relations. A renewed interest in scientific and cultural exchanges was spearheaded by Nikita Khrushchev and President Eisenhower, who had encouraged people-to-people contacts in his efforts to “wage peace.” The initial official exchanges were in the sciences and the arts. The exchanges were later formalized in the Lacy-Zaroubin Agreement, in which the USSR and the US agreed to exchange experts to gather information and encourage understanding and cooperation between the two nations.

The first of the exchanges was a visit to the USSR (August 13 through September 14, 1957) made by US public health experts, along with an arts exchange that included Hollywood stars of film. Hyde was one of the five-member US public health mission that included Thomas Parran, then dean of the University of Pittsburgh School of Public Health; Otis L. Anderson, assistant surgeon general; Malcolm Merrill, California’s director of public health; and Leonid Snegireff, professor at the Harvard University School of Public Health. This group traveled to seven regions throughout the USSR, observing and noting the research and medical practices in the country at that time. The objective of the mission was to open the way for the development of more active relationships between public health and medical leaders of the US and the USSR; and, to facilitate the exchange of technical information in the health fields.

In September 1959, Nikita Khrushchev toured the US, bringing with him Aleksandr Markov, his personal physician and an official in the Soviet health ministry, and Markov’s colleague Dr. V.M. Butrov. The two Russian physicians traveled with Khrushchev throughout the US, visiting major US medical centers along the way before returning to Washington. Markov and Butrov then met with Surgeon General Leroy Burney and Hyde to prepare proposals for continuing and expanding the scientific exchange program to be considered by Khrushchev and President Eisenhower at their upcoming Camp David meeting. In further meetings with the leaders and scientists at the National Institutes of Health, the expected agreement included the addition of a joint US and USSR collaboration in health research.

On December 26, 1962, just two months after the Cuban Missile Crisis, Hyde was contacted by the American Red Cross to serve on a special mission to Cuba. Hyde accompanied two pharmacists on a chartered flight to Havana arriving on January 2. This medical team met with Fidel Castro to negotiate the release of several political prisoners in Cuba in exchange for medical supplies. One reason Hyde was chosen was that he knew most of the prominent leaders in the Cuban medical community from his work with the WHO. The trip lasted only five days, and Hyde flew back to the US on January 7.

== Post-government years ==
In 1962, after 20 years in the USPHS, Hyde retired from government service and became the director of international medical education at the Association of American Medical Colleges (AAMC). That same year he arranged for the representatives of the University of Rochester and the University of Lagos, Nigeria, to meet to discuss arrangements for faculty recruitment and exchanges for the newly opened medical school. The exchange was subsequently supported the Commonwealth Fund of New York. While at AAMC, Hyde was organizer and on the steering committee for the Institute on International Medical Education’s conference, “Manpower for the World’s Health,” convened in Washington, D.C., in March 1966, and editor of its subsequent journal.

In 1972, Hyde retired from the AAMC and became a founding member and executive director of the World Federation for Medical Education (WFME). He was one of the moving forces behind that organization’s first international conference, “Population Change: A Strategy for Physicians” held in Stockholm in September 1974, which addressed the issue of “mounting global concern over the precarious balance between population growth and the world’s space and resources…and the medical profession’s unique technical and leadership potential.” Hyde was the executive director of WFME at the time of his death in Bethesda, Maryland on November 5, 1982.
