= Christ Church (Lancaster County, Virginia) =

Historic church in Virginia, United States

- U.S. National Register of Historic Places
- U.S. National Historic Landmark
- Virginia Landmarks Register
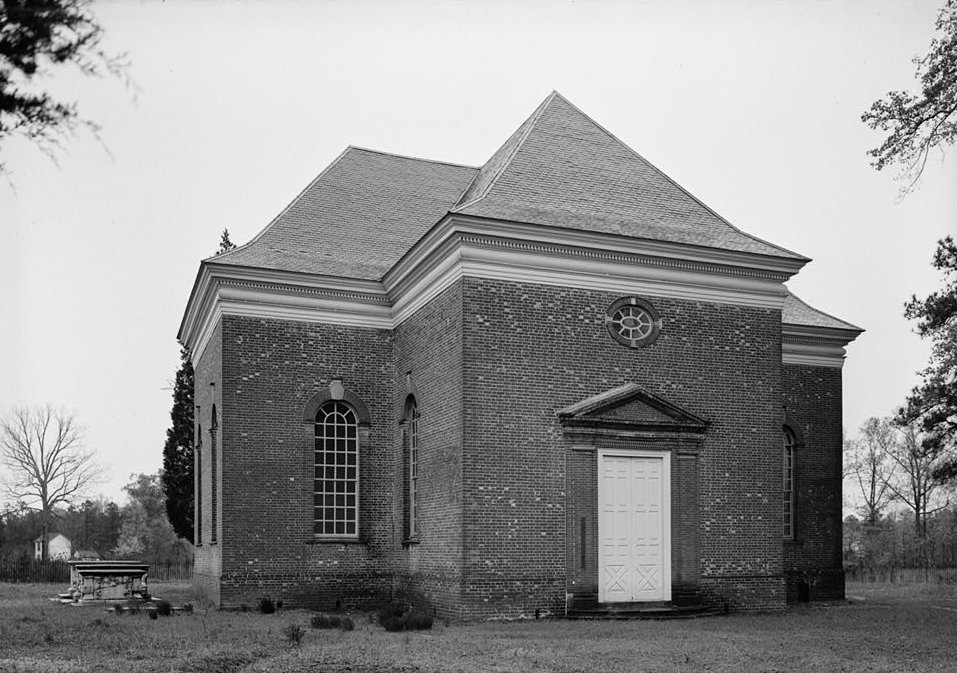
- Photograph taken during the early stages of the restoration of Christ Church

- Location within Virginia Location within the United States
- Location: 420 Christ Church Road, Weems, Virginia
- Coordinates: 37°40′36.5″N 76°25′7″W
- Area: 13 acres (5.3 ha)
- Built: 1735
- Architectural style: Georgian
- NRHP reference No.: 66000841
- VLR No.: 051-0004

Significant dates
- Added to NRHP: October 15, 1966
- Designated NHL: May 30, 1961
- Designated VLR: September 9, 1969

Christ Church is a historic Episcopal church in Lancaster County, Virginia, north of Irvington. Built in 1732–35, it is notable for its unique Georgian design, and is one of the best-preserved colonial churches in the southern United States. The church is the only colonial Virginia church that still has its original high-backed pews and one of two that has maintained its original three-tiered pulpit.

== History ==
The first church erected at the site was a wooden building, the construction of which was funded by powerful landowner John Carter in 1670. Carter died before the construction was completed, but was buried on the church grounds alongside four of his five wives. John Carter's son Robert, a wealthy vestryman and planter, decided that the parish deserved a more substantial place of worship and, in 1730, funded and supervised the construction of a brick building on the approximate foundations of the old wooden church. Christ Church was connected to Robert Carter's Corotoman mansion by way of a cedar-lined road, in order to emphasize the importance of the benefactor and his family.

The church thrived until the disestablishment of the Anglican church in Virginia in 1786. This event, coupled with the Glebe Act of 1802, which authorized the state to seize church property, crippled the Anglican (now Episcopal) church in the state, and Christ Church lost both money and parishioners. Operating only intermittently in the 19th century, the church fell into disrepair; the Carter family tombs in the yard were subject to weathering and neglect, and vandals stole bricks from the exterior. Still, the church fared better than many other colonial churches, and in 1927 the Association for the Preservation of Virginia Antiquities began work on restoration of the site.

== Architecture ==
The unknown original architect endowed the structure with many of the hallmarks of the Georgian style, including a formal, symmetrical layout, pedimented facades, and classical detail.

Among the more noted features of the church's interior are its high-backed box pews, which held entire families at service. Its unique wineglass pulpit is located in the building's center and the three levels of lecterns were intended to show the relative importance of the readings delivered there. The bottom tier was for community announcements, the middle for the gospel, and the top tier was reserved for the delivery of the sermon.

== Current use ==
Today, Christ Church is owned and operated as a museum by the non-profit Foundation for Historic Christ Church, which has almost completely restored its 18th-century appearance. The church was designated a National Historic Landmark in 1961. Religious services are still held at 8:00 a.m on Sundays in the summer months in cooperation with nearby Grace Church.

== Gallery ==
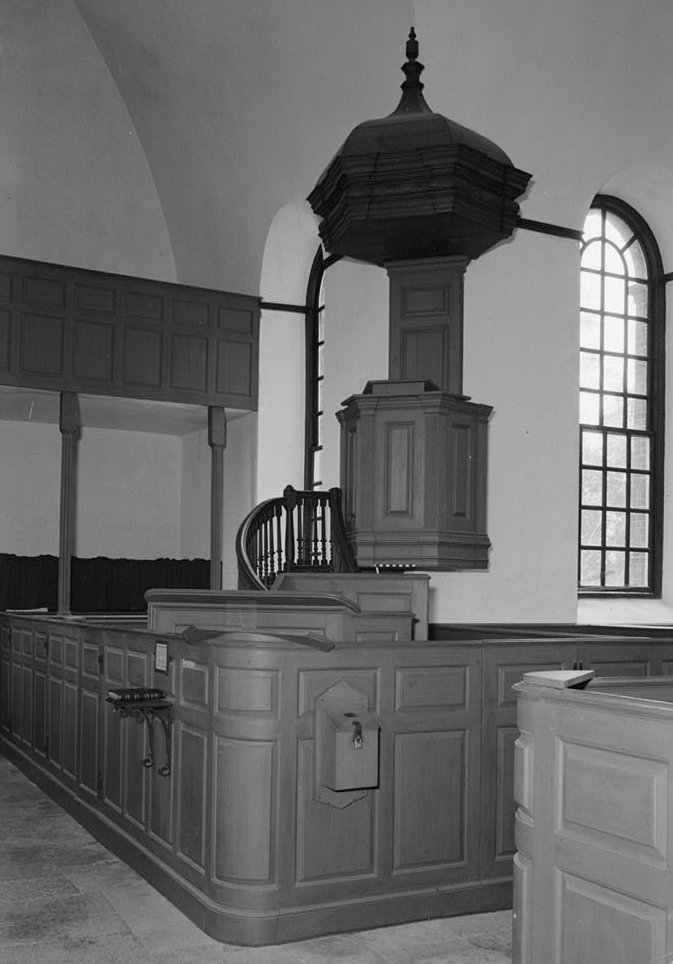
Pulpit of Christ Church

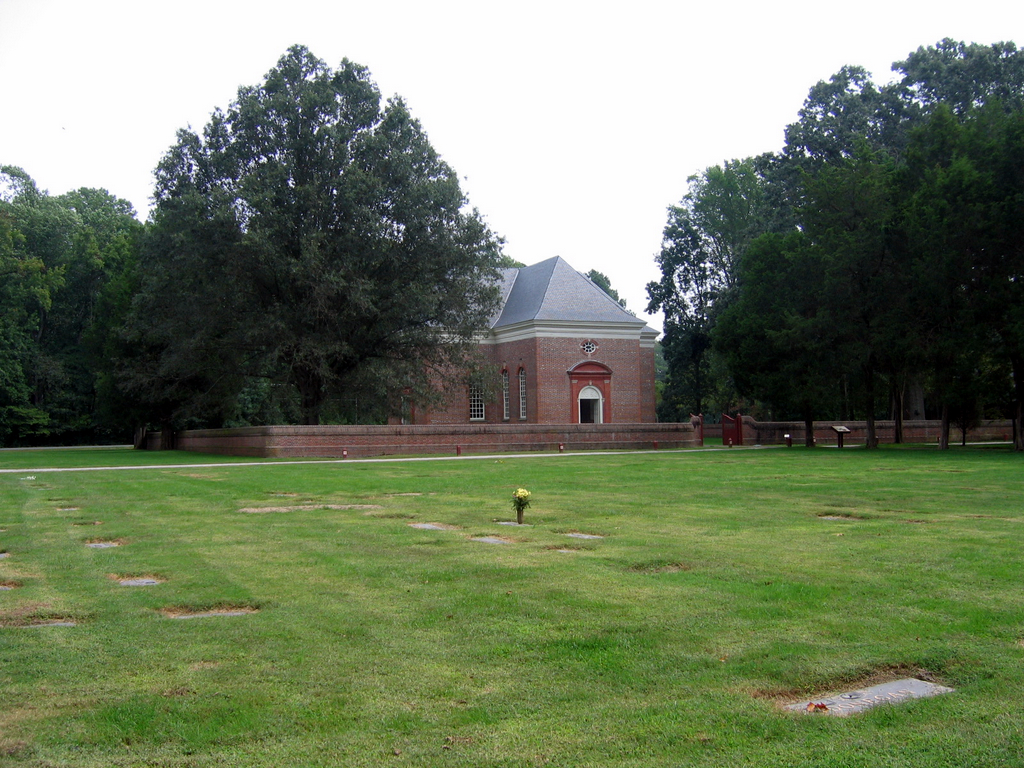
Christ Church with graveyard and restored brick wall in foreground

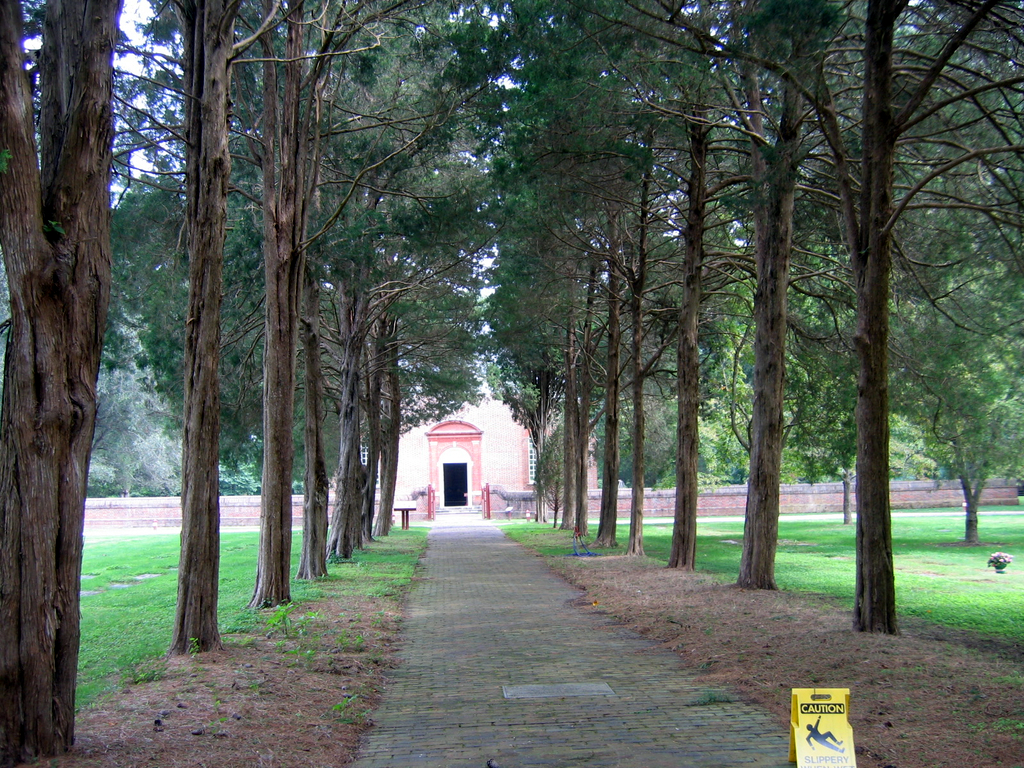
Cedar-lined road to Robert Carter's Corotoman plantation

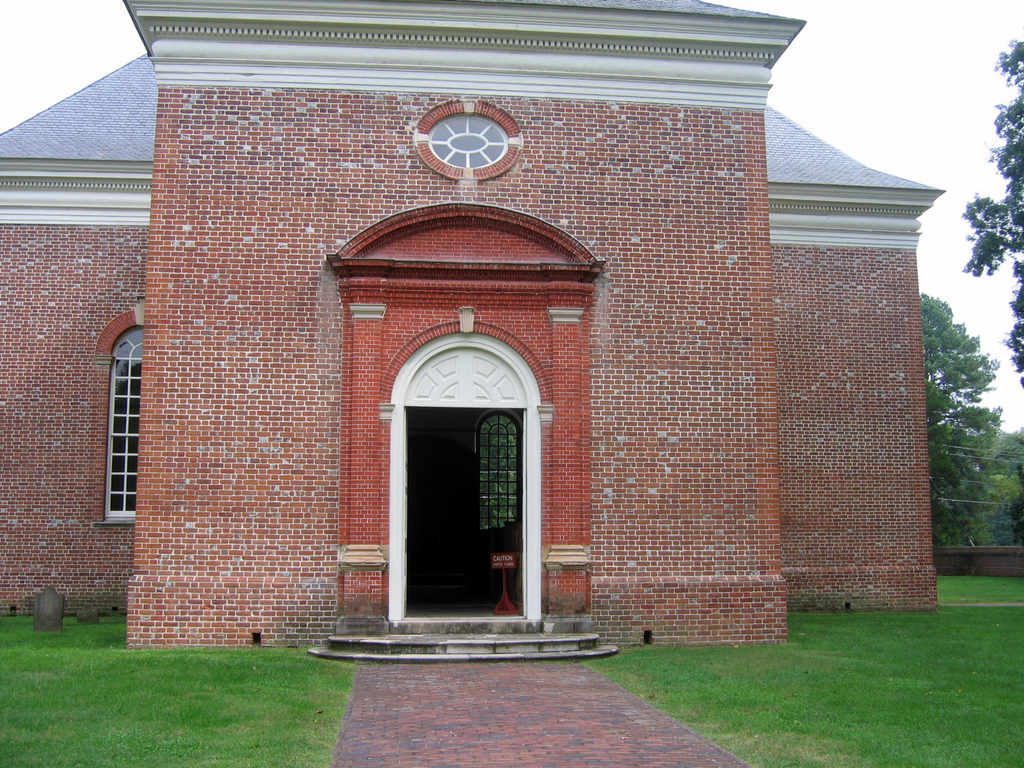
Main entrance, showing decorative brickwork

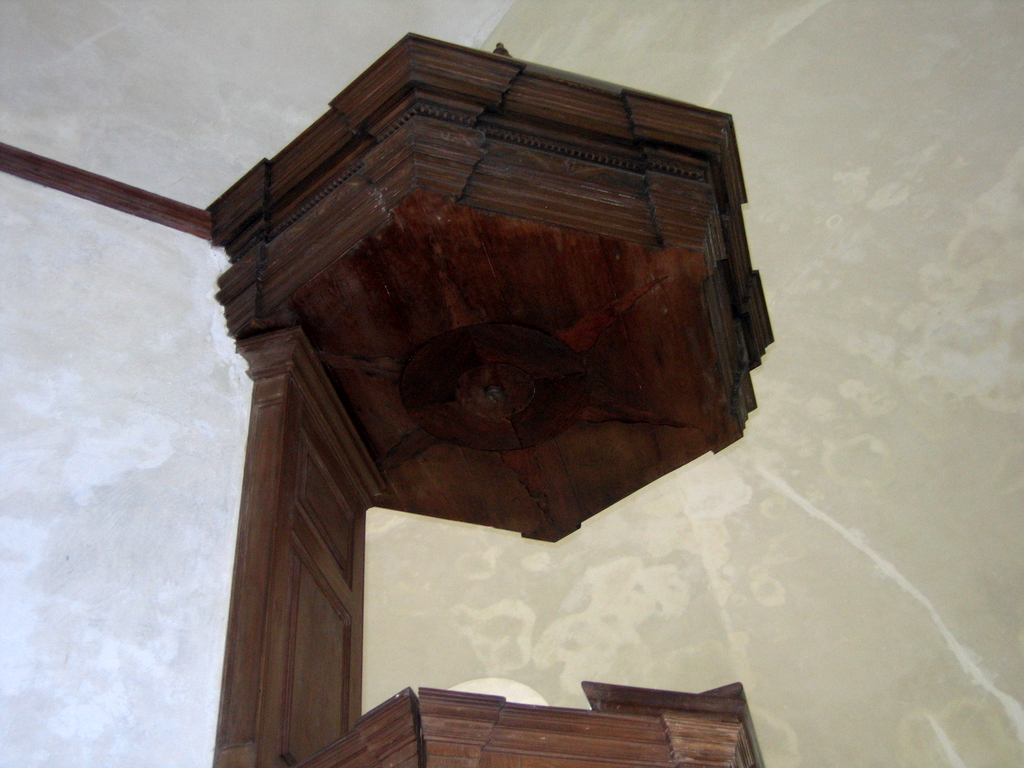
Intricate woodwork on the sounding board above the pulpit

== See also ==
- List of National Historic Landmarks in Virginia
- National Register of Historic Places listings in Lancaster County, Virginia
