= Pop Castle =

Historic house in Virginia, US

- U.S. National Register of Historic Places
- Virginia Landmarks Register
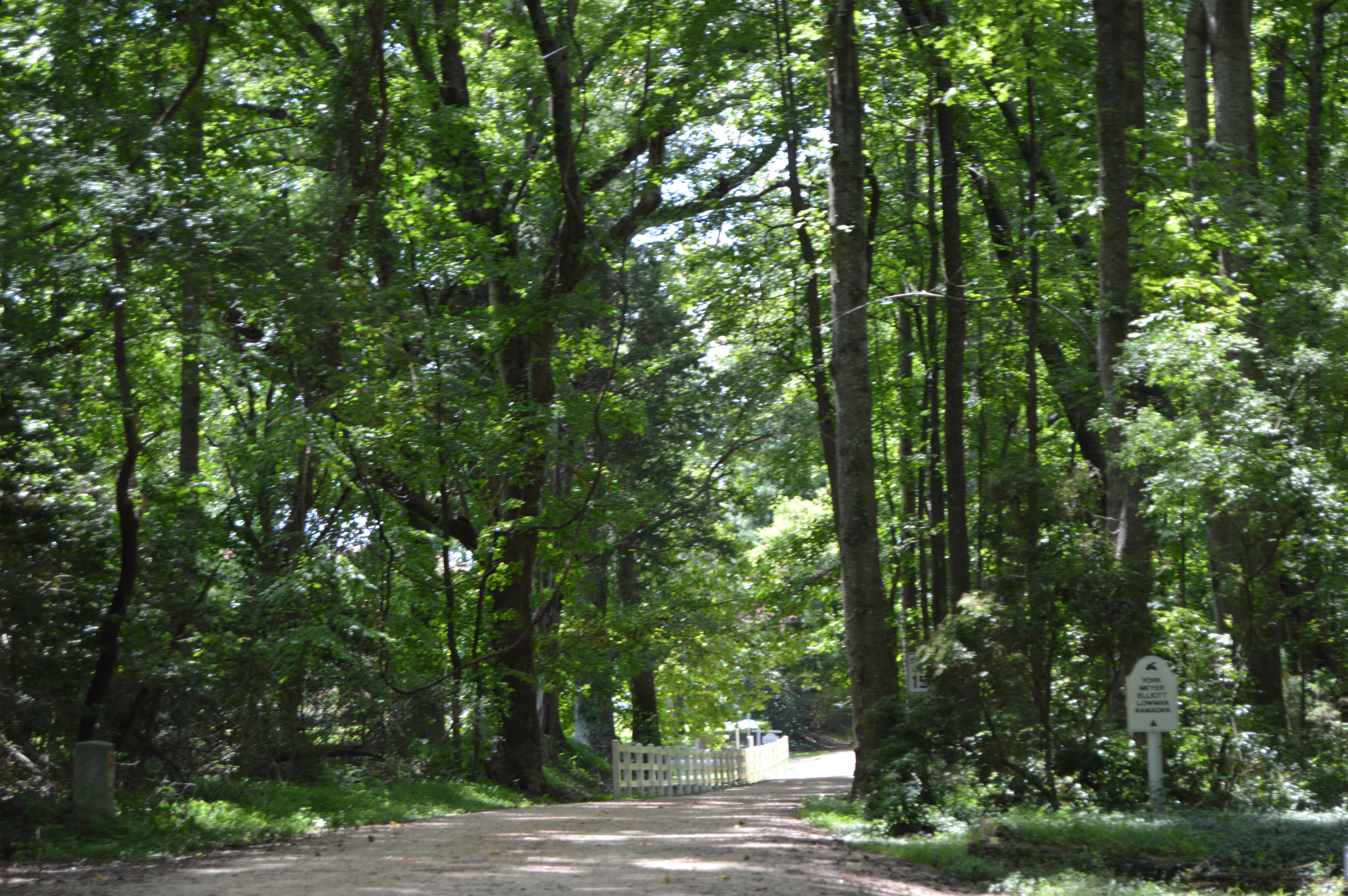
- Property entrance

- Location within Virginia Location within the United States
- Location: VA 659 on the Rappahannock River, near White Stone, Virginia
- Coordinates: 37°38′28″N 76°25′32″W
- Area: 12.1 acres (4.9 ha)
- Built: 1855
- Architectural style: Greek Revival
- NRHP reference No.: 89000505
- VLR No.: 051-0075

Significant dates
- Added to NRHP: June 16, 1989
- Designated VLR: December 13, 1988

Pop Castle is a historic plantation house located near White Stone, Lancaster County, Virginia. It was built in 1855, and is a two-story, five-bay, gable roofed frame dwelling with Greek Revival style details. It has a single pile, central passage plan and two exterior end chimneys. It rests partly on the foundations of an 18th-century dwelling. Also on the property are the contributing antebellum granary and a roughly contemporary smokehouse. The property also includes the archaeological remains of most related service structures.

It was listed on the National Register of Historic Places in 1989.
