= Ottoman, Virginia =

Unincorporated community in Virginia, United States

- Unincorporated community
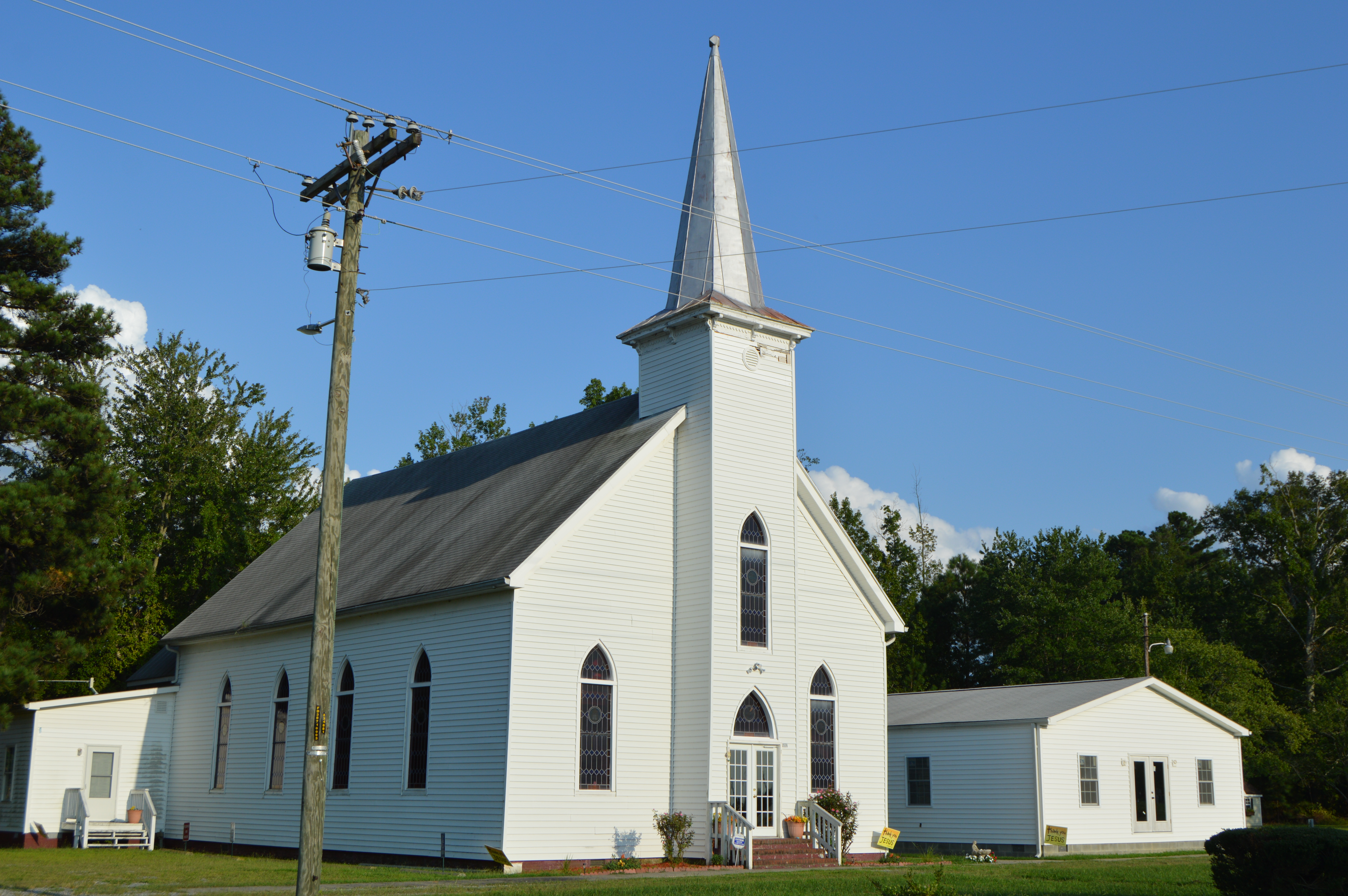
- Hartswell Baptist Church on River Road

- Location in Virginia Location in the United States
- Coordinates: 37°42′07″N 76°31′12″W
- Country: United States
- State: Virginia
- County: Lancaster
- Time zone: UTC−5 (Eastern (EST))
  - Summer (DST): UTC−4 (EDT)

Ottoman is an unincorporated community in Lancaster County located on the Northern Neck of the Rappahannock River in the U.S. state of Virginia.

Locustville, a historic plantation house built in 1855, was listed on the National Register of Historic Places in 1994.

== Notable people ==
The American educator Claybrook Cottingham was born in Ottoman in 1881. Also a native of the town was diplomat George H. Steuart, who was born there in 1907. His father, the physician George H. Steuart, lived in Ottoman until his death in 1945.

== Bibliography ==
- Nelker, Gladys P, The Clan Steuart, Genealogical publishing, 1970.
