= Gundry Sanitarium =

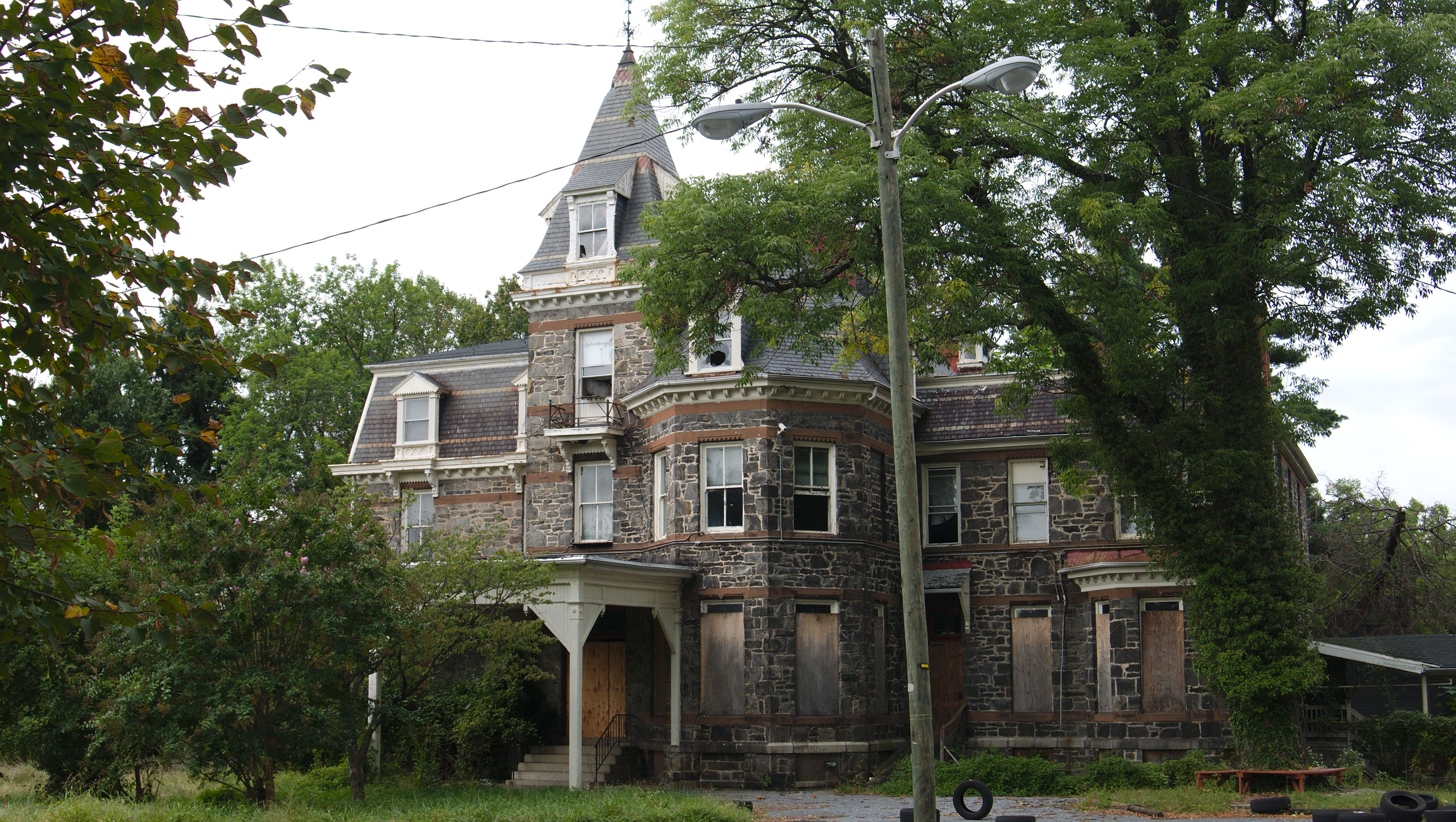
- Gundry Sanitarium, 1914

Geography
- Location: 2 North Wickham Road, Baltimore, Maryland, United States
- Coordinates: 39.284289°N 76.697829°W

Organization
- Type: Specialist

Services
- Emergency department: No
- Specialty: Sanitorium

History
- Former names: Athol, Relay Sanitorium
- Constructed: 1880
- Founded: 1900
- Opened: 1900
- Closed: 2000
- Demolished: circa 2000 (partially)

Links
- Lists: Hospitals in Maryland

The Gundry Sanitarium, also known variously as the Relay Sanitarium, Lewis Gundry Sanitarium, Gundry Hospital, and Conrad Sanitarium, was a medical institution established in 1900 in Southwest Baltimore City, Maryland.

The building, originally named "Athol," was constructed in 1880 as a residence for Charles J. Baker and designed by Baltimore architect T. Buckler Ghequier.

It was purchased in 1900 by Dr Alfred Gundry as a private sanitarium for the "care of nervous disorders of women that required treatment and rest away from home." It continued in existence as a private sanitarium until 1997. It was purchased by the city in 2006 for historic preservation, but it burned down on September 27, 2021, prior to any improvements.
