= Weems, Virginia =

Unincorporated community in Virginia, United States

- Census-designated place
- Location in Virginia Location in the United States
- Coordinates: 37°39′17″N 76°26′38″W
- Country: United States
- State: Virginia
- County: Lancaster

Area
  - Total: 0.80 sq mi (2.06 km^{2})
  - Land: 0.54 sq mi (1.40 km^{2})
  - Water: 0.26 sq mi (0.67 km^{2})
- Elevation: 19 ft (5.8 m)
- Time zone: UTC−5 (Eastern (EST))
  - Summer (DST): UTC−4 (EDT)
- ZIP code: 22576
- Area code: 804
- FIPS code: 51-83888
- GNIS feature ID: 1496383

Founded in 1886, Weems is an unincorporated community and census-designated place (CDP) in Lancaster County in the U. S. state of Virginia. It was first drawn as a CDP prior to the 2020 census. As of the 2020 census, Weems had a population of 184.

Christ Church, physically located in Weems, was designated a National Historic Landmark in 1961. Corotoman was listed on the National Register of Historic Places in 1970.

The community is in southern Lancaster County, at the end of Virginia State Route 222 (Weems Road) on the north bank of the tidal Rappahannock River, where it is joined by Carter Creek. Via VA 222 it is 6 miles (10 km) southwest of Kilmarnock, the largest town in the county. Aside from its historical significance as described above, Weems is a small, mostly residential community, but does operate waterside businesses and is a popular seaman's spot for berthing or entering the Chesapeake Bay. Its majority of residents are middle aged to retirement age (45–80).

== Demographics ==
Weems first appeared as a census designated place in the 2020 U.S. census.
