= Irvington, Virginia =

- Town
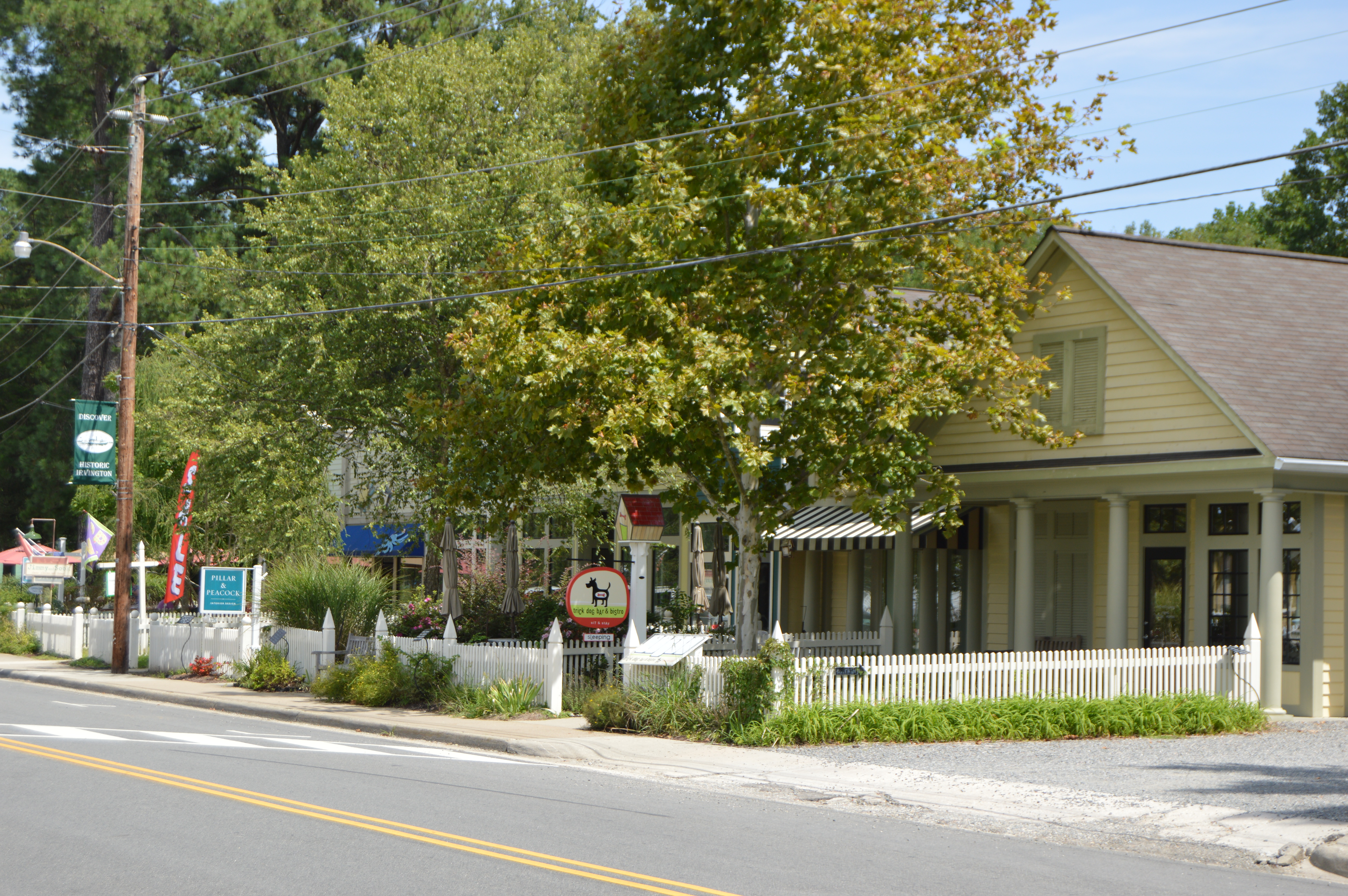
- Businesses on State Route 200

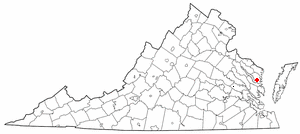
- Location of Irvington, Virginia
- Coordinates: 37°39′40″N 76°25′10″W
- Country: United States
- State: Virginia
- County: Lancaster

Area
  - Total: 1.83 sq mi (4.73 km^{2})
  - Land: 1.51 sq mi (3.90 km^{2})
  - Water: 0.32 sq mi (0.83 km^{2})
- Elevation: 33 ft (10 m)

Population (2020)
  - Total: 474
  - Density: 264.5/sq mi (102.11/km^{2})
- Time zone: UTC-5 (Eastern (EST))
  - Summer (DST): UTC-4 (EDT)
- ZIP code: 22480
- Area code: 804
- FIPS code: 51-40088
- GNIS feature ID: 1468521
- Website: town.irvington.va.us

Irvington is a town on the Rappahannock River in Lancaster County, Virginia, United States. The population was 474 at the 2020 census. Located on a peninsula known as the Northern Neck, it has been designated a historic district.

== History ==
From 1871 until 1893, the town was called "Carter's Creek Wharf" or simply "Carter's Creek", since steamboats docked at the relatively deep water confluence of a tributary that had much earlier been called "Cossotomen Creek" and later "Carter's Creek" after early settler John Carter, Sr., the father of the powerful colonial era politician King Carter, who was the Virginia agent for the Northern Neck Proprietary. The town formally adopted the name "Irvington" to honor Baltimore native Captain Levin Irvington following a 1891 referendum, since mail had been often confused between this town and that of Center Cross in relatively nearby Essex County.

The original Chesapeake Academy, 1889–1907, was located in Irvington.

== Historic district ==
- Irvington
- U.S. National Register of Historic Places
- U.S. Historic district
- Location: King Carter Drive and Irvington Road, Irvington, Virginia
- Coordinates: 37°39′31″N 76°25′21″W
- Area: 1,107.2 acres (448.1 ha)
- Built: 1740
- Architectural style: Greek Revival, Gothic Revival, et al.
- NRHP reference No.: 00000895
- Added to NRHP: December 8, 2000

The historic district, Irvington, also known as Carters Creek, is a 1,107.2-acre (448.1 ha) area that was listed on the National Register of Historic Places in 2000. In 2000, it included 149 contributing buildings, 3 contributing sites and one other contributing structure.

== Geography ==
Irvington is located at 37°39′41″N 76°25′9″W (37.6615, −76.4191).

According to the United States Census Bureau, the town has a total area of 1.8 square miles (4.7 km^{2}), of which 1.5 square miles (3.9 km^{2}) is land and 0.3 square mile (0.9 km^{2}) (18.13%) is water.

== Demographics ==
Historical population
Census	Pop.	Note	%±
1960	570		—
1970	504		−11.6%
1980	567		12.5%
1990	496		−12.5%
2000	673		35.7%
2010	432		−35.8%
2020	474		9.7%
U.S. Decennial Census

According to the 2020 census, there were 474 people, 368 total housing units with 248 occupied, and 260 families in the town. Of the total residents, 454 were white, 10 were mixed race, 10 were Hispanic or Latino, 6 were black, 2 were Native American, 1 was Asian, and 1 was some other race. 89.2% of residents owned a house instead of renting.

The median age in Irvington was 58.6 years. 35.5% of the population was 65 of older. 10.4% of the population was a veteran, with 91.7% of those being male. 56.7% of the residents had a bachelor's degree or other form of higher education.

The median household income was $118,750. The median income for families was $157,500. For married-couple families it was $174,375, and $57,632 for non-family households. 4.6% of the population were below the poverty line, 13% of which were age 65 and older.

According to the 2000 census, the population density was 449.0 people per square mile (173.2/km^{2}). There were 325 housing units at an average density of 216.8 per square mile (83.7/km^{2}).

== Features and amenities ==
Irvington is the home of the marine resort The Tides Inn. On King Carter Drive is the Steamboat Museum, which details the history of the steamboats that traveled the Chesapeake Bay and stopped in Irvington.

Lancaster National Bank (later Chesapeake National Bank and currently Chesapeake Bank) was formed in Irvington in 1900 to cater to the growing town. Irvington was also a stop for Chesapeake National Bank's Boat 'n Bank, a houseboat with bank tellers that cruised the Rappahannock River wharves, canneries and oyster houses. The town has a club, Rappahannock River Yacht Club, and a marina, Irvington Marina.

Children of the town attend Lancaster County Public Schools and there is one independent school located in Irvington. Reopened in 1965, Chesapeake Academy serves children from 3 years old through eighth grade. Chesapeake Academy's original 1890 schoolhouse is located on King Carter Drive; it is now the Hope & Glory Inn. Next door to the schoolhouse is the Irvington Methodist Church; its parsonage is now a women's clothing store, The Dandelion.

Since the 1970s winemaking has become a growing vocation in the region, with a number of wineries located nearby. Irvington is located within the Northern Neck George Washington Birthplace American Viticultural Area winemaking appellation.
