= White Stone, Virginia =

- Town
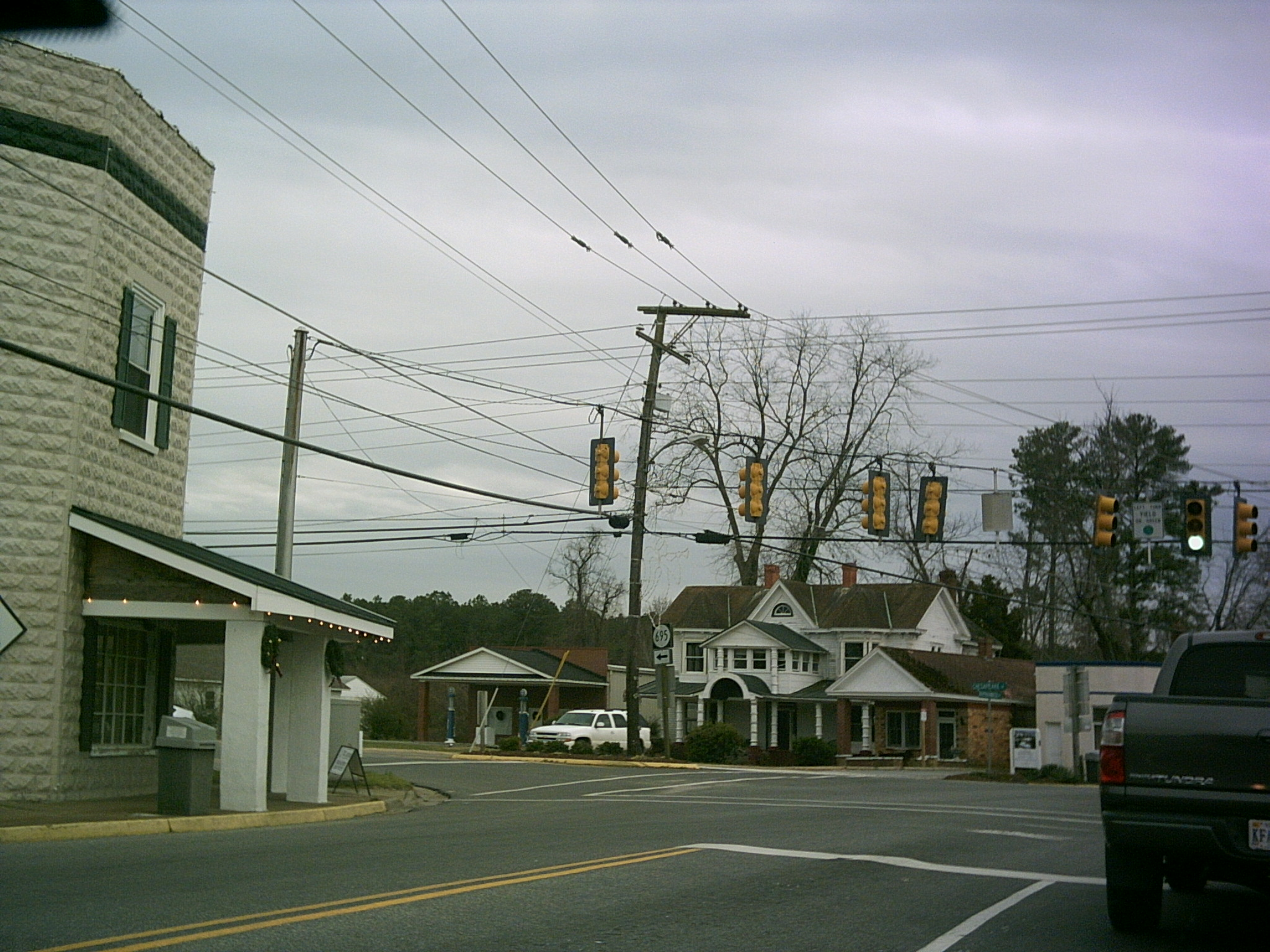
- Central White Stone

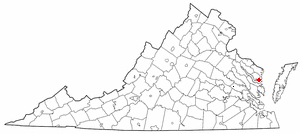
- Location of White Stone, Virginia
- Coordinates: 37°38′43″N 76°23′28″W
- Country: United States
- State: Virginia
- County: Lancaster

Area
  - Total: 0.98 sq mi (2.54 km^{2})
  - Land: 0.98 sq mi (2.53 km^{2})
  - Water: 0.0039 sq mi (0.01 km^{2})
- Elevation: 49 ft (15 m)

Population (2020)
  - Total: 380
  - Density: 390/sq mi (150/km^{2})
- Time zone: UTC−5 (Eastern (EST))
  - Summer (DST): UTC−4 (EDT)
- ZIP code: 22578
- Area code: 804
- FIPS code: 51-85600
- GNIS feature ID: 1476645
- Website: https://townofwhitestone.org/

White Stone is a town in Lancaster County, Virginia, United States. The population was 380 at the 2020 census. White Stone is one of many small towns located in Virginia's Northern Neck region.

== History ==
White Stone traces its earliest colonial history to the arrival of Epaphroditus Lawson, who was born in Yorkshire, a county in northern England. In 1649–50, Epaphroditus acquired 4,600 acres of land along the Rappahannock River, including the present site of White Stone, where he lived until his death in 1652. For many generations thereafter, the Lawson family "served the community as justices, sheriffs, and vestrymen."

The town of White Stone was founded in 1715, and sits adjacent to the nearby towns of Lancaster and Kilmarnock. However, White Stone was not incorporated until 1953. There are a variety of theories about how White Stone got its distinctive name: one story has the name derived from a nearby stream, where locals would use a white stone to hone their tools. Another story has the town's name deriving from an 1819 church deed, which identified a property boundary as being "near the road leading by the white stone."

The area was involved in the War of 1812 and the Civil War. During the latter conflict, the historic plantation home of Pop Castle was bombarded by a Union gunboat. Pop Castle would later be listed on the National Register of Historic Places in 1989.

Following the Civil War, White Stone had developed a small, thriving business community, including a general store, choral hall, and a hat-maker. By 1921, Albert Terry Wright served as principal for the county's first school for black American students.

Ultimately, the city of White Stone's "heyday" was during the late 19th and early 20th century, with the population having stagnated since the American Census of 1960, the first taken after the town's incorporation. Today, White Stone remains a small, rural town, with a focus on tourism: the area is home to a local seafood market, the Allure Art Center, and other attractions. Additionally, the town has recently received state and federal grants to develop a sewer system and to revitalize its business district.

== Geography ==
White Stone is located at 37°38′43″N 76°23′28″W (37.645182, −76.391242).

According to the United States Census Bureau, the town has a total area of 1.0 square mile (2.6 km^{2}), all land.

Historical population
Census	Pop.	Note	%±
1960	395		—
1970	381		−3.5%
1980	409		7.3%
1990	372		−9.0%
2000	358		−3.8%
2010	352		−1.7%
2020	380		8.0%
U.S. Decennial Census

== Demographics ==
Racial composition as of 2020 (NH = Non-Hispanic)
Race / Ethnicity	Pop 2020	% 2020
White alone (NH)	282	74.21%
Black or African American alone (NH)	66	17.37%
Native American or Alaska Native alone (NH)	1	0.26%
Asian alone (NH)	5	1.32%
Pacific Islander alone (NH)	0	0.00%
Some Other Race alone (NH)	0	0.00%
Mixed Race/Multi-Racial (NH)	13	3.42%
Hispanic or Latino (any race)	13	3.42%
Total	380	100.00%

Note: the US Census treats Hispanic/Latino as an ethnic category. This table excludes Latinos from the racial categories and assigns them to a separate category. Hispanics/Latinos can be of any race.

As of the census of 2000, there were 358 people, 163 households, and 101 families living in the town. The population density was 362.1 people per square mile (139.8 people/km^{2}). There were 187 housing units at an average density of 189.2 units per square mile (73.1 units/km^{2}). The racial makeup of the town was 86.31% White, 10.34% African American, 2.23% Asian, 0.28% from other races, and 0.84% from two or more races. Hispanic or Latino of any race were 0.84% of the population.

There were 163 households, out of which 27.0% had children under the age of 18 living with them, 52.1% were married couples living together, 8.0% had a female householder with no husband present, and 38.0% were non-families. 32.5% of all households were made up of individuals, and 22.1% had someone living alone who was 65 years of age or older. The average household size was 2.20 and the average family size was 2.73.

In the town, the population was spread out, with 19.8% under the age of 18, 7.0% from 18 to 24, 25.4% from 25 to 44, 26.0% from 45 to 64, and 21.8% who were 65 years of age or older. The median age was 42 years. For every 100 females, there were 88.4 males. For every 100 females aged 18 and over, there were 82.8 males.

The median income for a household in the town was $28,125, and the median income for a family was $31,875. Males had a median income of $31,500 versus $22,000 for females. The per capita income for the town was $17,835. About 6.7% of families and 13.9% of the population were below the poverty line, including 24.7% of those under age 18 and 20.3% of those age 65 or over.
