= Virginia State Route 354 =

State highway in Lancaster County, Virginia, US

State Route 354
- River Road

Route information
- Maintained by VDOT
- Length: 13.53 mi (21.77 km)
- Existed: 1942–present
- Tourist routes: Virginia Byway

Major junctions
- South end: Dead end near Bertrand
- SR 201 near Mollusk
- North end: SR 3 near Litwalton

Location
- Country: United States
- State: Virginia
- Counties: Lancaster

Highway system
- Virginia Routes; Interstate; US; Primary; Secondary; Byways; History; HOT lanes
← SR 353	→ SR 355

State Route 354 (SR 354) is a primary state highway in the U.S. state of Virginia. Known as River Road, the state highway runs 13.53 miles (21.77 km) from a dead end near Bertrand north to SR 3 near Litwalton in western Lancaster County.

SR 354 is a Virginia Byway north of Ottoman.

== Route description ==
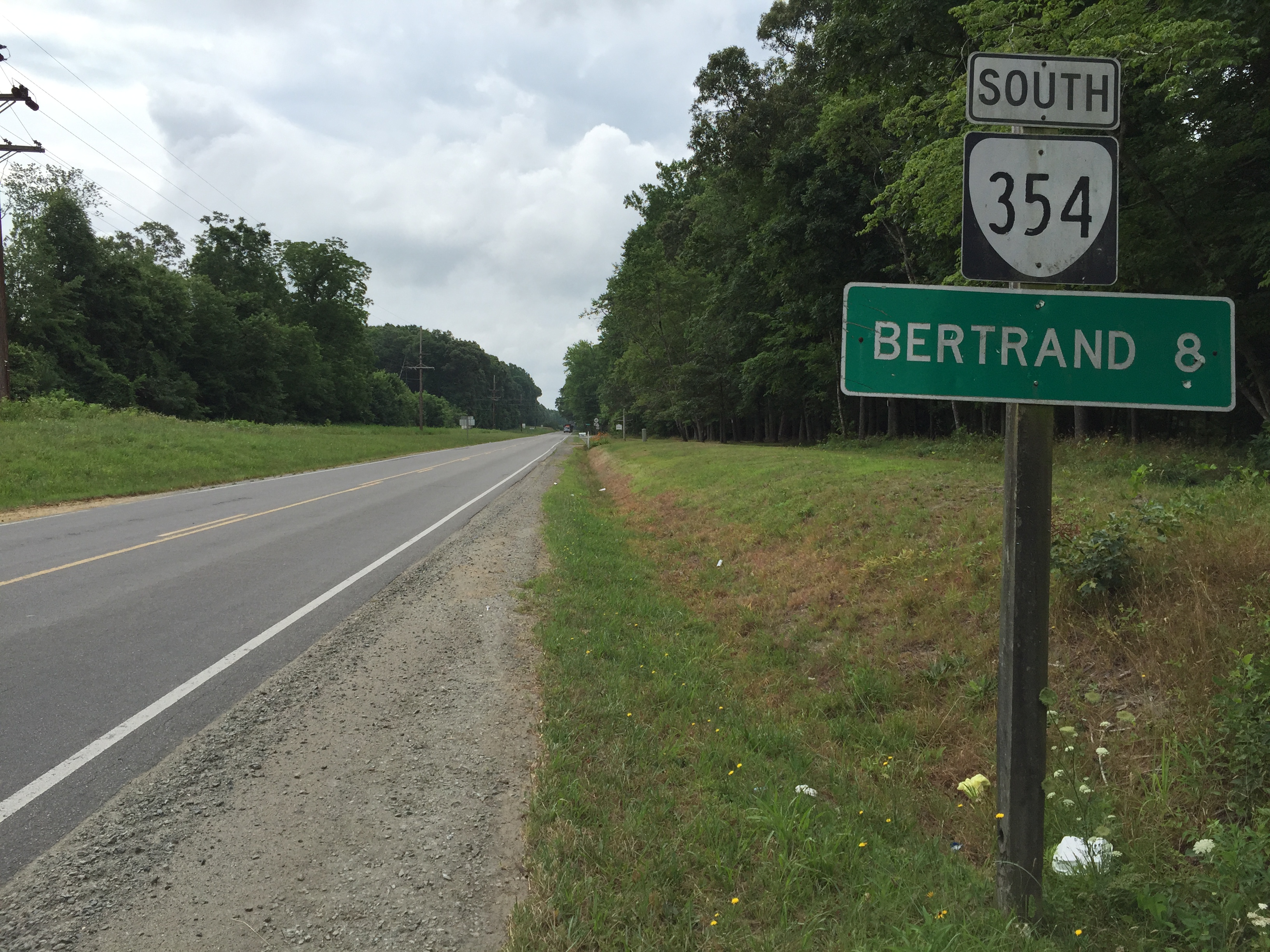
View south along SR 354 at SR 201 near Mollusk

SR 354 begins at a dead end on Whitehouse Creek, an estuarine tributary of the Corrotoman River. The state highway heads west and northwest along the peninsula between the Western Branch of the Corrotoman River to the east and the Rappahannock River to the west. SR 354 passes through the hamlets of Bertrand, Senora, and Ottoman, the last the site of a free ferry across the Western Branch. North of Mollusk, the state highway meets the southern end of SR 201 (White Chapel Road). SR 354 continues through Somers, which lies between Nuttsville to the east and Belle Isle State Park to the west on the Rappahannock River. The state highway passes through Litwalton and crosses Balls Branch of Lancaster Creek before reaching its northern terminus at SR 3 (Historyland Highway). The SR 3 junction is just east of where SR 3 crosses Lancaster Creek into Richmond County.

== Major intersections ==
The entire route is in Lancaster County.

Location	mi	km	Destinations	Notes
Bertrand	0.00	0.00	Dead end at Corrotoman River	Southern terminus
			SR 682 (Millenbeck Road) – Millenbeck	former SR 354 south
Ottoman			SR 604 (Ottoman Ferry Road)	to Merry Point Ferry
			SR 681 (Monaskon Road) – Monaskon	former SR 201 south
	7.26	11.68	SR 201 north (White Chapel Road) – Lively	Southern terminus of SR 201
Litwalton			SR 622 (Morattico Road) – Morattico, Kilmarnock	former SR 3 east
	13.53	21.77	SR 3 (Mary Ball Road)	Northern terminus
1.000 mi = 1.609 km; 1.000 km = 0.621 mi
