= USS Epping Forest =

1943 Ashland-class dock landing ship

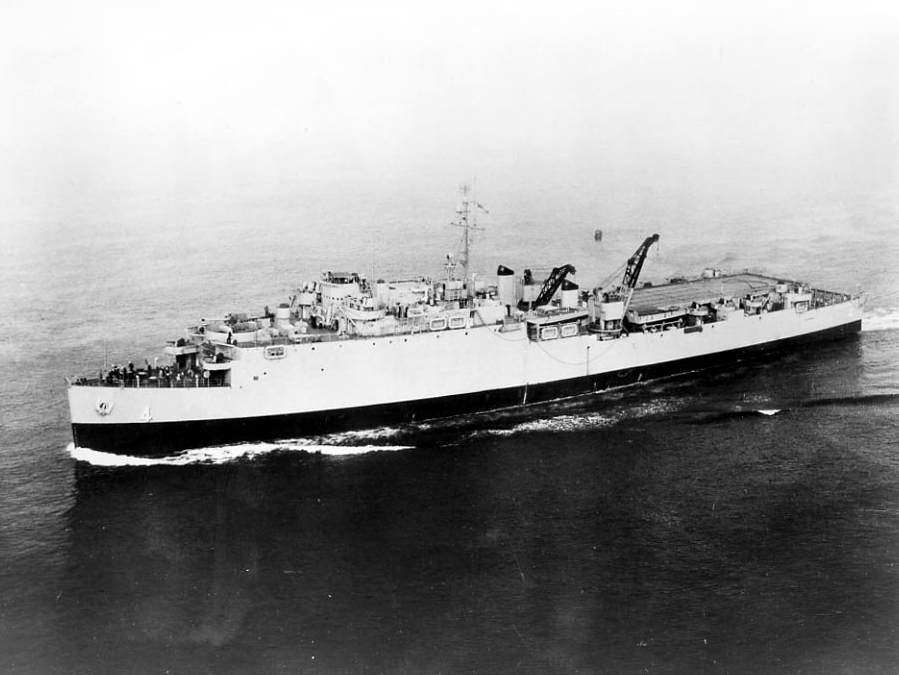
- USS Epping Forrest (LSD-4) at sea, date and location unknown.

History

United States
- Name: USS Epping Forest
- Namesake: Epping Forest, an estate in Lancaster County, Virginia
- Ordered: as (APM-4), a Mechanized Artillery Transport
- Builder: Moore Dry Dock Company
- Laid down: 23 November 1942
- Launched: 2 April 1943
- Commissioned: 11 October 1943
- Decommissioned: 25 March 1947, Sasebo, Japan
- Recommissioned: 1 December 1950
- Decommissioned: 31 October 1968
- Stricken: 31 October 1968
- Fate: Sold for scrapping, 30 October 1969.

General characteristics
- Displacement: 7,930 tons (loaded), 4,032 tons (light draft)
- Length: 457 ft 9 in (139.52 m) overall
- Beam: 72 ft 2 in (22.00 m)
- Draft: 8 ft 2½ in (2.5 m) fwd, 10 ft ½ in (3.1 m) aft (light); 15 ft 5½ in (4.7 m) fwd, 16 ft 2 in (4.9 m) aft (loaded)
- Propulsion: 2 × Babcock & Wilcox Boilers, D Type, 2 Drum, Single Furnace, Single Uptake, Oil Fired; 2 × Skinner Uni-Flow reciprocating engines; Twin screws
- Speed: 17 knots (31 km/h)
- Range: 8,000 nmi. at 15 knots; (15,000 km at 28 km/h)
- Boats & landing craft carried: 3 × LCT (Mk V or VI); each w/ 5 medium tanks or; 2 × LCT (Mk III or IV); each w/ 12 medium tanks or; 14 × LCM (Mk III); each w/ 1 medium tank; or 1,500 long tons cargo or; 47 × DUKW or; 41 × LVT or; Any combination of landing vehicles and landing craft up to capacity
- Capacity: 22 officers, 218 men
- Complement: 17 officers, 237 men (ship); 6 officers, 30 men (landing craft)
- Armament: 1 × 5 in / 38 cal. DP gun; 2 × 40 mm quad AA guns; 2 × 40 mm twin AA guns; 16 × 20 mm AA guns

USS Epping Forest (LSD-4/MCS-7) was an Ashland-class dock landing ship acquired by the U.S. Navy during World War II for duty in the Pacific Theater. Her task was to carry and land amphibious landing craft and other equipment and to recover and repair landing craft when possible. Named for Epping Forest Plantation, an estate in Lancaster County, Virginia where Mary Ball Washington, mother of George Washington (first President of the United States), was born, she was the only U.S. Naval vessel to bear the name.

Originally authorized as USS Epping Forest (APM-4), a mechanized artillery transport, the ship was reclassified as dock landing ship USS Epping Forest (LSD-4) on 1 July 1941; laid down 23 November 1942 at the Moore Drydock Company of Oakland, California; launched 2 April 1943; sponsored by Mrs. J. H. Heintz; and commissioned 11 October 1943.

== Onboard aircraft capability ==
Aircraft (still in commission in late 1940s or early 1950s) were fitted/retro-fitted with a prefabricated steel grated "Portable Deck" suspended between the wing walls and supported by removable I-beam girders. The aft end of the portable deck contained a wooden helicopter platform, enabling the ship to land and launch one helicopter at a time. Stowage of helicopters was limited to capacity of the portable deck installed for the mission. Aircraft servicing was limited to re-fueling. With portable deck and aircraft platform installed, the Landing ship, dock, was still capable of transporting, launching and repairing smaller amphibious craft and vehicles up to the size of a Landing Craft Utility (LCU) in their well decks.

== World War II ==
Epping Forest sailed from San Diego, California, 13 January 1944, with U.S. Marines on board for training in the Hawaiian Islands. She cleared Maui 22 January, combat-loaded for the invasion of the Marshalls, and sent men and artillery-laden landing craft ashore in the initial assaults on Roi and Namur 31 January. After replenishing at Funafuti early in February, Epping Forest sailed to Tulagi, where alterations were made, and she loaded men and equipment of the 1st Marines. These she landed in the assault on Emirau 20 March. During the next three weeks, Epping Forest brought reinforcements and supplies in to Emirau from Guadalcanal and Manus, and on 10 April, arrived at Finschhafen to prepare for the Hollandia operations.

=== South Pacific operations ===
Epping Forest arrived off Aitape on 22 April 1944 for preinvasion bombardment, then sent her landing craft ashore in the assault and returned to Finschhafen to reload. She shuttled supplies to Aitape and Hollandia and repaired landing craft at Buna, and on 11 May reached Guadalcanal to load marines and their equipment for the invasion of Guam. After standing by in reserve during the invasions of Tinian and Saipan, she arrived off Guam 21 July for the assault landings. For five days she lay off the island repairing landing craft, and then returned to Guadalcanal, from which she made several voyages to Manus transporting landing craft through August.

=== Leyte Gulf operations ===
Epping Forest brought her specialized facilities into play once more in the invasion of the Palau Islands, lying off Peleliu to repair landing craft after the assault of 15 September 1944. After staging at Hollandia, she joined in the initial assault in Leyte Gulf on 20 October, landing engineering troops and their equipment, and sailing immediately to Hollandia to reload. She continued to voyage between New Guinea and Leyte with men and gear into December, then prepared for the Lingayen Gulf assault. On 9 January 1945, Epping Forest sent her boats away in the assault of Lingayen Gulf, working under almost constant air attack. The next day she got underway for Morotai to reload U.S. Army equipment, with which she returned to Lingayen 27 January. For two weeks she repaired landing craft here, then put into Leyte on her way to transfer landing craft from Saipan to Guam, and again from Milne Bay to Leyte, arriving 13 March to prepare for the Okinawa assault.

=== Okinawa operations ===
Epping Forest arrived off the Hagushi beaches 1 April 1945 for the invasion of Okinawa, and during the days of bitter fighting, repaired landing craft at various anchorages around the island. She worked with the skill of long practice under air attacks and the constant threat of enemy suicide attacks by small boats and swimmers as well as aircraft.

=== End-of-war decommissioning ===
On 1 July she sailed for Portland, Oregon, arriving 25 days later. After carrying landing craft along the west coast and to the Hawaiian Islands, she brought a load of small craft to Bikini Atoll in June 1946 for use in Operation Crossroads, the atomic weapons tests, and returned to San Diego, California, 27 June. She was decommissioned and placed in reserve at Long Beach, California, 25 March 1947.

== Recommissioned during Korean War ==
Epping Forest was recommissioned 1 December 1950, and sailed along the U.S. West Coast for training until 24 May 1951, when she departed San Diego for the troubled Far East. Operating in support of United Nations forces until 7 February 1952, she returned to the west coast for local training and exercises. From October 1952 to September 1953 she again deployed to the waters off Korea where she supported minesweeping operations in Wonsan harbor, the first such use of an LSD.

== "Operation Passage to Freedom" ==
Epping Forest underwent overhaul in November 1953 and resumed her station in the Far East during the following April. She participated in amphibious operations at Okinawa and Korea, transported the refugees of French Indo-China in the "Operation Passage to Freedom" mission during the summer of 1954 and engaged in exercises off the Japanese coast. Her tour of Far Eastern waters in 1955–56 was devoted to local operations. In August 1957, she again departed San Diego to engage in the U.S. 7th Fleet "Operation Phiblink" in which she won special recognition for her performance. Following fleet exercises in the South China Sea, she returned to San Diego in April 1958 for a period of yard availability.

== Continued Far East operations ==
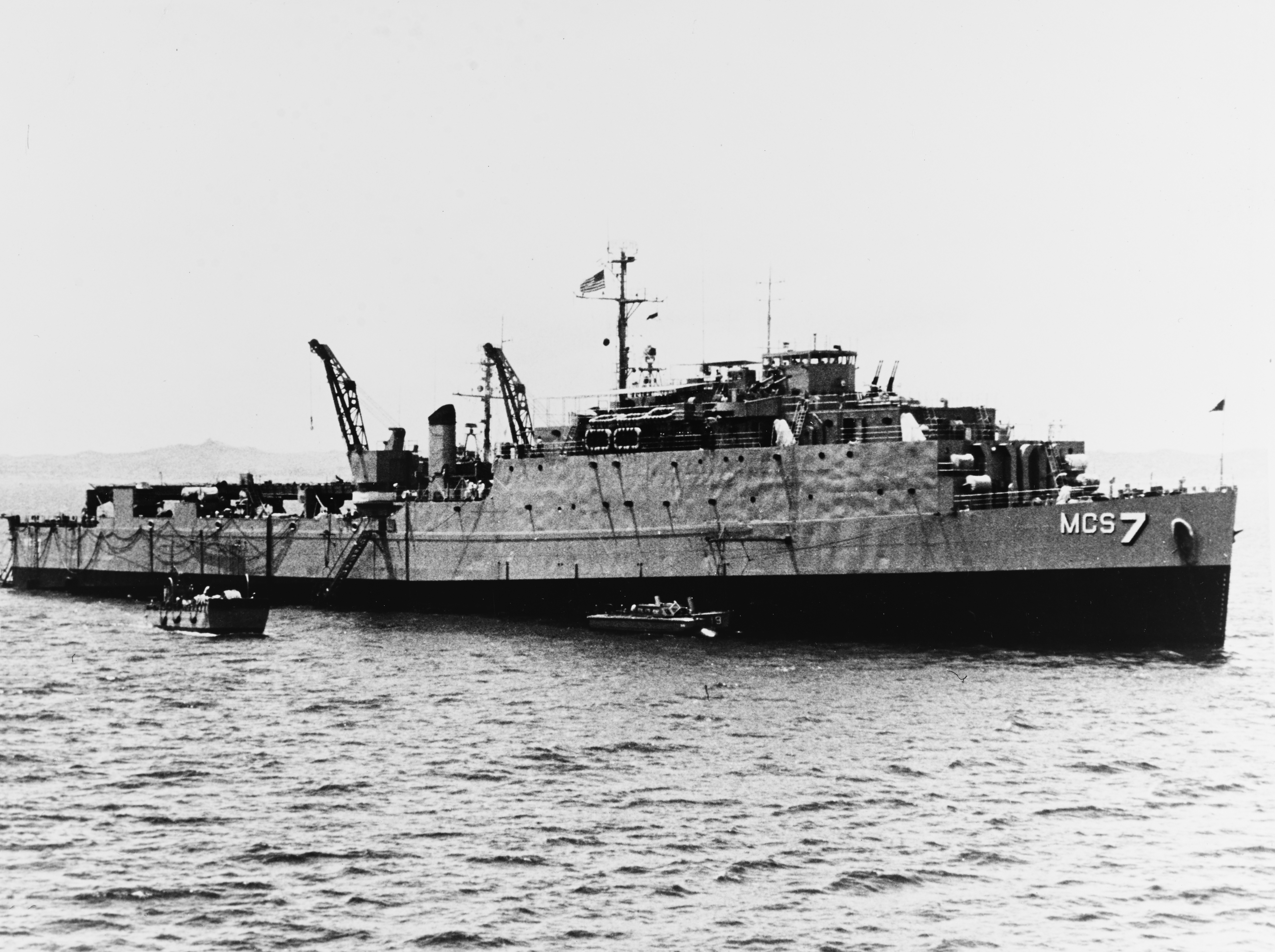
USS Epping Forest (MCS-7) in the mid-1960s.

Coastal operations preceded her return to the western Pacific in June 1959 to provide transportation and support to a division of minesweeping craft. During the Laotian crisis she joined Amphibious Squadron One at Okinawa in a state of combat readiness for any eventuality. Epping Forest returned to the States in November 1959 for another period of overhaul and upkeep. Assigned to the control of Mine Forces, Pacific, she was ordered to a new homeport, Sasebo, Japan, whence she sailed on 22 August 1960 prior to offloading quantities of supplies for "Operation Hand Clasp" in Korea. During the remainder of the year she cruised as flagship of Commander, Mine Flotilla One, and took part in mine countermeasure exercises. She was designated a mine countermeasures support ship and renamed USS Epping Forest (MCS-7) 30 November 1962.

== Decommissioning ==
Epping Forest was decommissioned and struck from the Naval Vessel Register 1 November 1968. She was sold for scrapping 30 October 1969.

== Military awards and honors ==
Epping Forrest earned eight battle stars for World War II service, five battle stars for Korean War service, and six campaign stars for Vietnam War service. Her crew was eligible for the following medals, ribbons, and commendations:

- American Campaign Medal
- Asiatic-Pacific Campaign Medal (8)
- World War II Victory Medal
- National Defense Service Medal (2)
- Korean Service Medal (4)
- Armed Forces Expeditionary Medal (6-Vietnam)
- Vietnam Service Medal (5)
- Republic of Vietnam Gallantry Cross Unit Citation
- Philippines Liberation Medal (3)
- United Nations Service Medal
- Republic of Vietnam Campaign Medal
- Republic of Korea War Service Medal
