= John Curlett =

American politician (1870–1944)

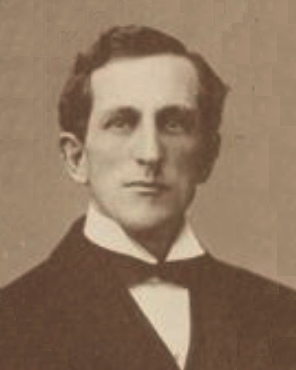
- Official portrait, 1908

Member of the Virginia House of Delegates for Lancaster and Richmond
- In office January 10, 1906 – January 12, 1910
- Preceded by: John M. Lyell
- Succeeded by: R. Carter Wellford

Personal details
- Born: March 15, 1870 Baltimore, Maryland, U.S.
- Died: February 3, 1944 (aged 73) Morattico, Virginia, U.S.
- Party: Democratic
- Spouse(s): Sedona Long; Mary Russell Neale
- Parent(s): Thomas Spicer Curlett; Susie Chilton Curlett
- Education: U.S. Naval Academy

John Curlett (March 15, 1870 – February 3, 1944) was an American politician who served in the Virginia House of Delegates. His father, T. Spicer Curlett, also served in the House.

John was born in Baltimore, Maryland, to Thomas Spicer and Susie Chilton Curlett, but he lived in Lancaster County, Virginia, for most of his early life. Susie was the daughter of Ralph H. and Susan Glascock Chilton, and the Chilton family home had been along the Corrotoman River.

John was a cadet at the U.S. Naval Academy at Annapolis, Maryland. He married Sedonia Long in 1900. Sedonia died in December 1904; she had been cleaning the handle of her husband's revolver when it accidentally fired, and she died nearly a week later as a result of the wound. John married Mary Russell Neale in 1915. In his later years, he served as an inspector for the Commission of Fisheries along the Rappahannock River. John died on February 3, 1944.
