= Belle Isle (Lancaster, Virginia) =

Historic house in Virginia, US

- U.S. National Register of Historic Places
- Virginia Landmarks Register
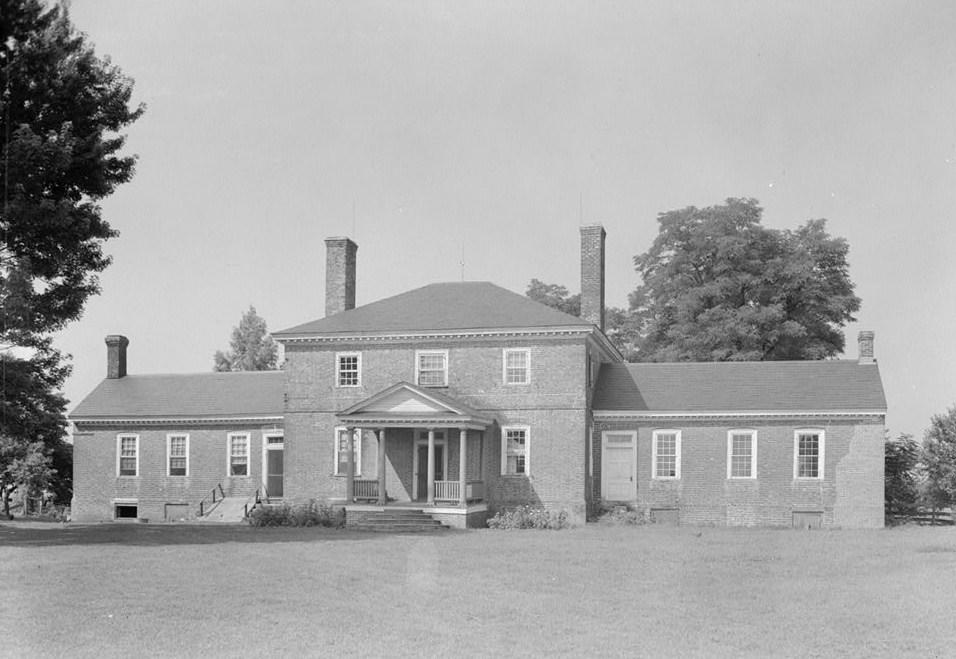
- Belle Isle, HABS Photo

- Location within Virginia Location within the United States
- Location: SW side of W end of VA 683, near Lancaster, Virginia
- Coordinates: 37°46′47″N 76°35′57″W
- Area: 1,000 acres (400 ha)
- Built: 1759
- Built by: Bertrand, William
- Architectural style: Colonial
- NRHP reference No.: 73002031
- VLR No.: 051-0001

Significant dates
- Added to NRHP: February 6, 1973
- Designated VLR: March 2, 1972

Belle Isle is a historic plantation house located near Lancaster, Lancaster County, Virginia.

A structure was built on the site before 1759 by William Bertand, who died that year and whose father John Betrand had emigrated to Virginia as a Huguenot refugee and patented the land in 1692. The will provided the two storey house would be inherited by his grandson Thomas Bertrand Griffin. Members of the Griffin family then sold it circa 1786 to Rawleigh William Downman, who remodeled the parlor around 1790 and probably added two one-story dependencies on either side of the main house. Downman's descendants continued to hold the property for more than a century. In 1918 it was bought by the Somers family, whose members began modernization. Part of this (completed by 1922) involved removing the original interior woodwork, whose quality was recognized and installed in the Winterthur Museum. In 1940, the property was acquired by owners who sought to restore its historical authenticity and commissioned Thomas Waterman to oversee the restoration, including of modern replica of the original paneling, which was installed in 1941.

The two-story, three-bay, brick central section has one-story flanking wings. The Colonial style dwelling has a hipped roof pierced by two tall interior end chimneys, and surrounded at its base by the original modillion cornice. Also on the property are two original one-story brick dependencies set perpendicular to the facade of the house.

It was listed on the National Register of Historic Places in 1987. In 1993, Belle Isle State Park was created, which does not include the house, but most of the original grounds.
