= Curlett =

Curlett is a surname. Notable people with the surname include:

- William and Alexander Curlett, American architects, father and son
- John Curlett (1870–1944), American politician
- T. Spicer Curlett (1847–1914), American politician
