= Steuart Blakemore Building =

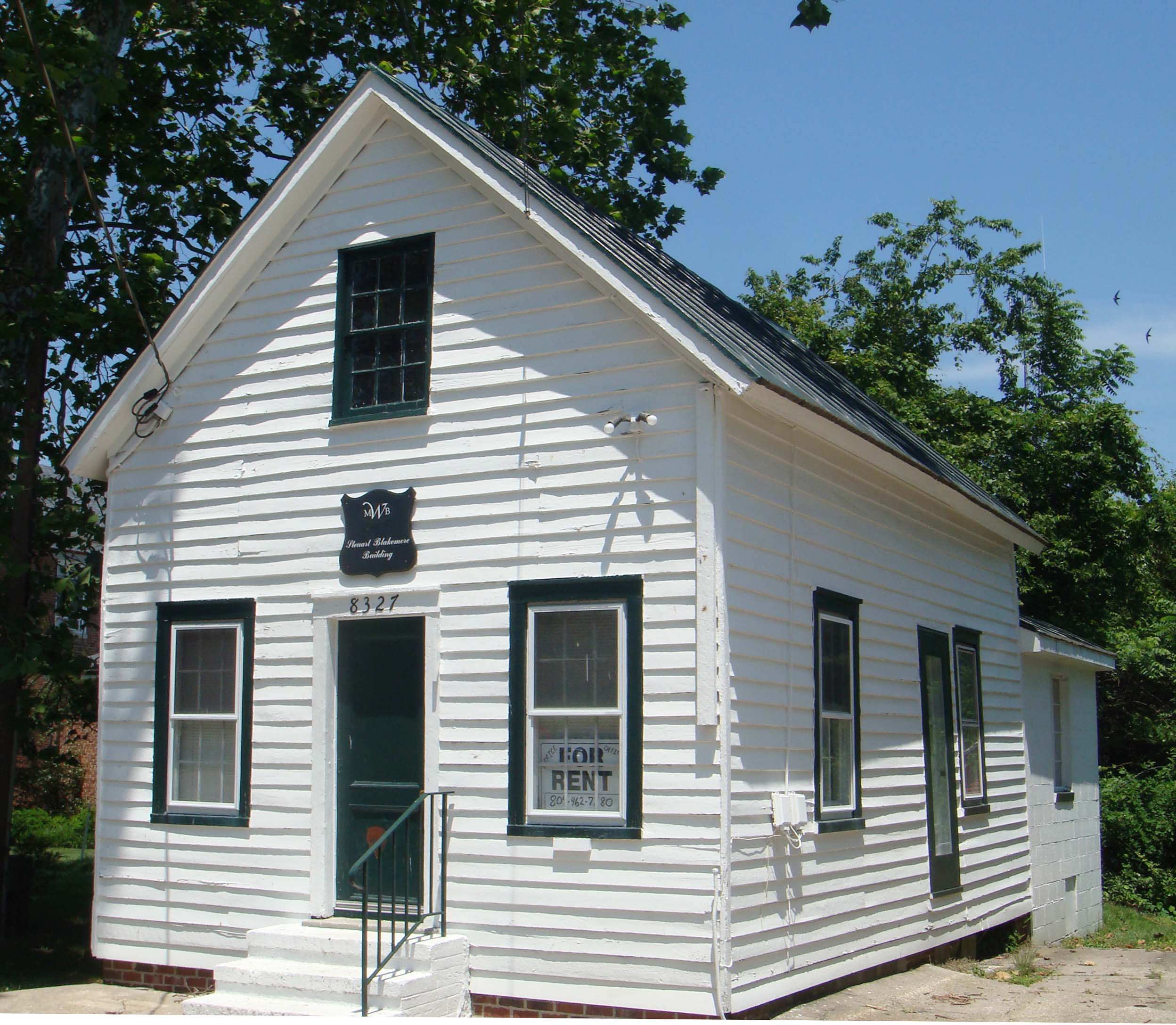
- The Steuart Blakemore Building, Lancaster, Virginia
- Interactive map of the Steuart Blakemore Building area
- Former names: The Old Post Office

General information
- Type: Old Post Office
- Location: Lancaster, Virginia, Lancaster, Virginia, United States
- Coordinates: 37°46′11.8″N 76°27′54.3″W
- Construction started: 1900

Technical details
- Structural system: Timber frame, wood siding

References
- Steuart Blakemore Building
- U.S. Historic district – Contributing property
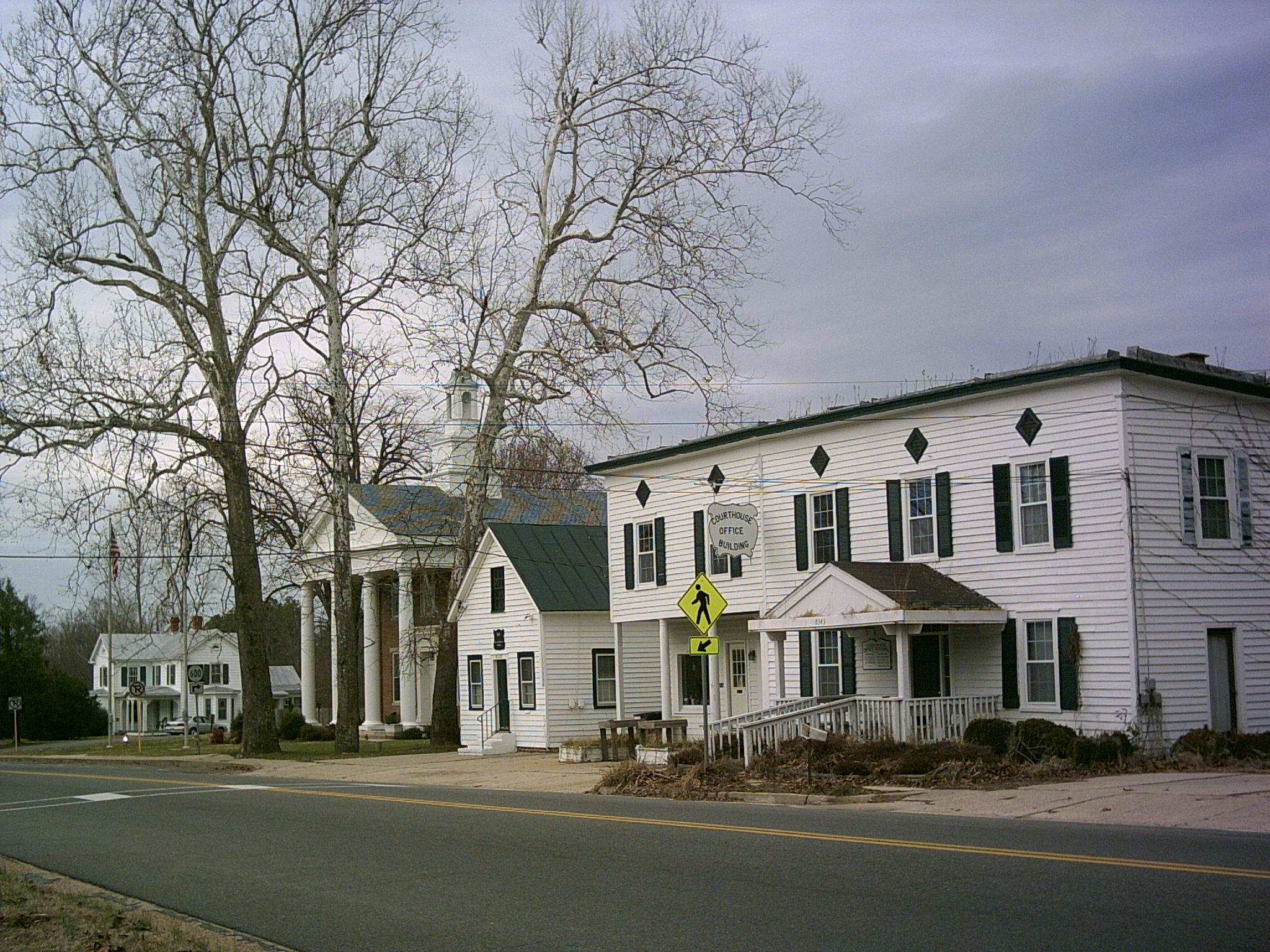
- View of the Lancaster Court House Historic District, including Lancaster Court House and the Steuart Blakemore Building
- Location: VA 3, Lancaster, Virginia
- Part of: Lancaster Court House Historic District (ID83003286)
- Designated CP: August 11, 1983

The Steuart Blakemore Building, originally built in 1900 and used as the Lancaster Post Office until 1931, is a museum and historical archive, part of the Mary Ball Washington Museum and Library in Lancaster, Virginia.

It forms a part of a five building complex, located in the Lancaster Court House Historic District, which also includes the Old Jail (1820), Clerk's Office (c. 1797), and Lancaster House.

The Museum is open to the public, who may view exhibits, participate in educational programs and trace family histories. It seeks to recapture the stories and the rich history of the people of the Northern Neck of the Chesapeake Bay, Virginia.

The building has in recent years been used both as storage for the Museum collections and also as the office for the Lancaster County History Book Committee.

== History ==
The building was constructed by an attorney, Harvey Gresham, in around 1900. Gresham ran his legal practice from the back of the building and the post office from the front. Until that time there had been no official post office in Lancaster, though postal stops were made to local taverns or stores.

After construction of a new Post Office during the 1950s, it became known as "The Old Post Office".

In 1983 it was designated a National Historic Landmark, as part of the Lancaster Court House Historic District.

The building was donated to the museum in 1986 by George H. Steuart, a native of Lancaster County. Steuart was a Foreign Service Officer who retired as consul in Liverpool, England. He purchased the building in 1981, and named it in honour of his parents, local physician George H Steuart (1865–1945) and Irene Blakemore.
