= Mary Ball Washington Museum and Library =

Coordinates: 37.768643°N 76.464786°W

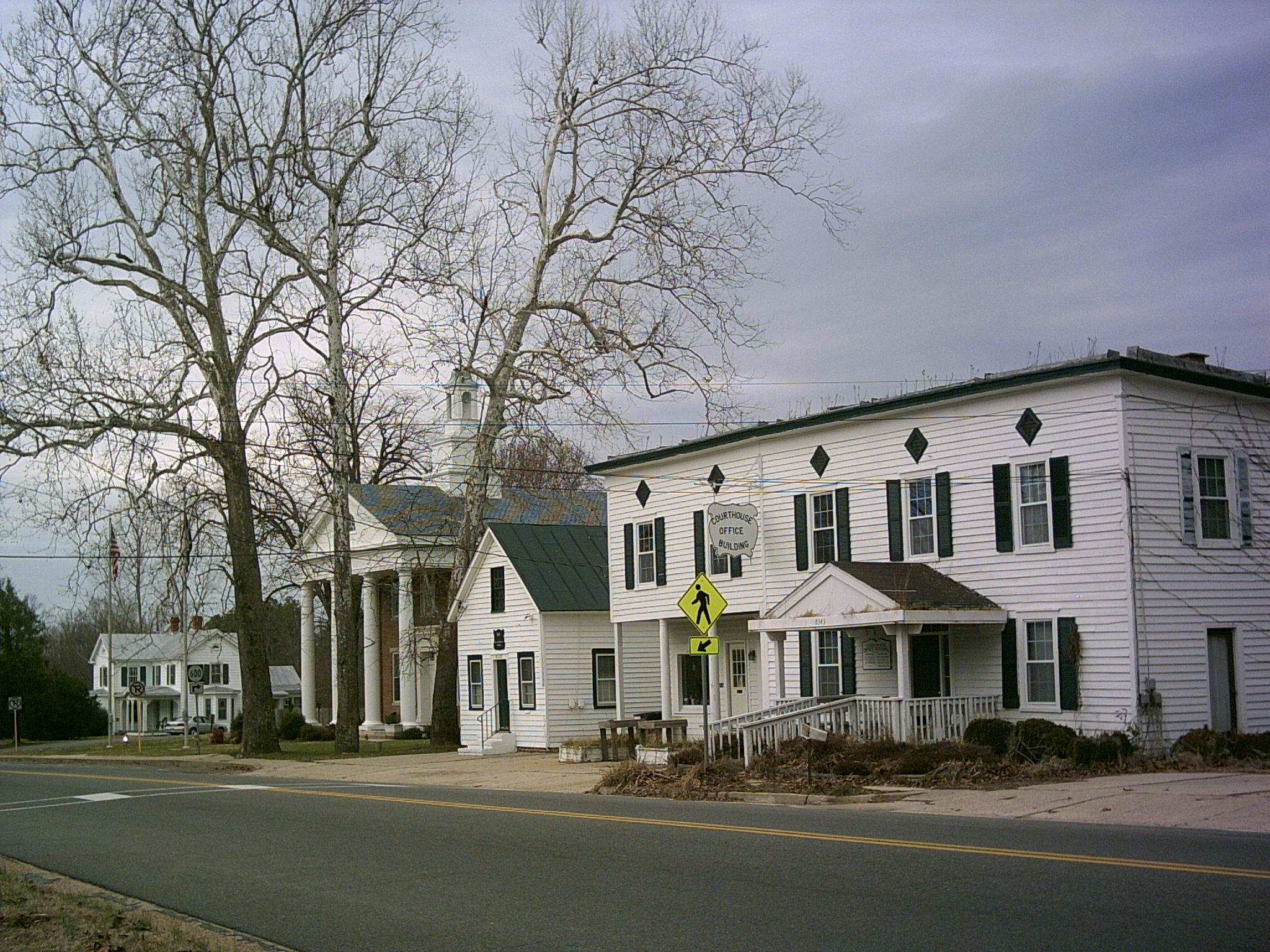
- Established: 1958
- Location: Lancaster, Virginia
- Website: www.mbwm.org

The Lancaster VA Historical Society/Mary Ball Washington Museum and Library is a museum and historical archive in the Northern Neck of The Chesapeake Bay, Virginia, United States. Its purpose is to preserve the history of Lancaster County, Virginia. It opened in 1958 and was named in honor of George Washington's mother, Mary Ball, a Lancaster County, Virginia native and granddaughter of the ca 1653 emigrant, William Ball I.

Past curators of the Mary Ball Washington Museum include Thomas M. Thacker II, Cathy Currey, Sarah J. Walker, and Sonja Headley.

== Collection ==
The Library has an extensive collection of books and genealogical research material dating back to 1651, covering some 350 years of history in Lancaster County in particular and the Northern Neck in general, as well as Middlesex and Essex counties. It contains approximately 10,000 books, periodicals and manuscripts concerning Virginia and the Northern Neck, as well as research material on adjoining states. The Museum seeks to recapture the stories and the rich history of the people of The Northern Neck.

== Complex ==
The museum and library are open to the public, who may tour the historic buildings, view exhibits, participate in educational programs and trace family histories.

In addition to the museum and library, the five building complex, located in the Lancaster Courthouse Historic District, includes the Old Jail (1820), Clerk's Office (c. 1797), Lancaster House and the Steuart Blakemore Building (c.1900).

== See also ==
- Lancaster Court House Historic District
