= William Ball =

William Ball may refer to:

- William Ball (MP) (fl. 1571), MP for Nottingham
- William Ball (settler) (1615–1680), English colonist
- William Ball (astronomer) (1627–1690), English astronomer
- William Lee Ball (1781–1824), Virginia congressman
- William Ball (Shropshire Giant) (1795–1852), 40 stone iron puddler
- William Ball (Michigan politician) (1830–1902), Lieutenant Governor of Michigan, USA, 1889
- William Ball (footballer) (1886–1942), English footballer
- William Macmahon Ball (1901–1986), Australian academic and diplomat
- William Ball (skier) (1908–1979), Canadian skier and Olympic competitor
- William Bentley Ball (1916–1999), American constitutional lawyer
- William Ball (director) (1931–1991), American stage director
- William L. Ball (born 1948), American, former US Navy Secretary
