= T. Spicer Curlett =

American politician (1847–1914)

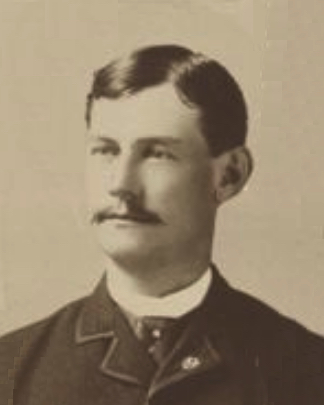
- Portrait of Curlett, c. 1887

Member of the Virginia House of Delegates from Lancaster and Richmond
- In office December 9, 1885 – December 7, 1887
- Preceded by: L.R. Stewart
- Succeeded by: Eugene S. Phillips

Member of the Virginia House of Delegates from Lancaster County
- In office December 6, 1871 – December 1, 1875
- Preceded by: Armistead S. Nickens
- Succeeded by: Charles Pitts

Personal details
- Born: Thomas Spicer Curlett; 1847 Baltimore, Maryland, U.S.
- Died: May 7, 1914 (aged 67) Baltimore, Maryland, U.S.
- Party: Republican
- Spouse: Susie Chilton (m. 1868)
- Children: John
- Education: Loyola College

Military service
- Allegiance: United States
- Branch/service: Union Army
- Unit: 1st Eastern Shore Infantry
- Battles/wars: American Civil War

Thomas Spicer Curlett (1847 – May 7, 1914) was a Republican farmer, postmaster and state legislator in Lancaster County, Virginia, during Reconstruction.

== Early and family life ==
He was born in Baltimore. His father, John Curlett (died February 17, 1896), was a bank director and philanthropist. He was a student at Loyola College in Baltimore in 1864. On November 4, 1868, he married Susie Chilton (1849-1933) of Lancaster County, who would survive him, as would their son John (1870-1944), who would also serve in the Virginia House of Delegates beginning in 1906 and also act as an oyster inspector.

== Career ==
During the American Civil War, Spicer was a private in Company B of the Maryland Volunteers Eastern Shore Infantry. On January 6, 1874, he became the postmaster for Litwalton in the Whitechapel district of Lancaster County. Spicer represented Lancaster County in the Virginia House of Delegates from 1875 to 1879, until census reorganization combined it with nearby Richmond County. He represented both counties 1885 to 1887. In 1888-1889 he was one of the principal farmers in the Litwalton division of the county. The Chesapeake Watchman lampooned his candidacy and denounced his previous affiliation with Republicans. Henry Straughan Hathaway who owned Enon Hall wrote to him denouncing his political affiliation with blacks.

Curlett may have returned to Baltimore by 1894 and worked as a salesman, though his wife and son remained in Lancaster County, Virginia. T.S. and Susie officially separated in 1898, since they found it "impossible to live together as man and wife in peace and comfort, there being nothing congenial between them." He died on May 7, 1914, in Baltimore, where he had gone for medical treatment; at the time of his death he was living in Morattico.
