= Lancaster Court House Historic District =

Historic district in Virginia, United States

- U.S. National Register of Historic Places
- U.S. Historic district
- Virginia Landmarks Register
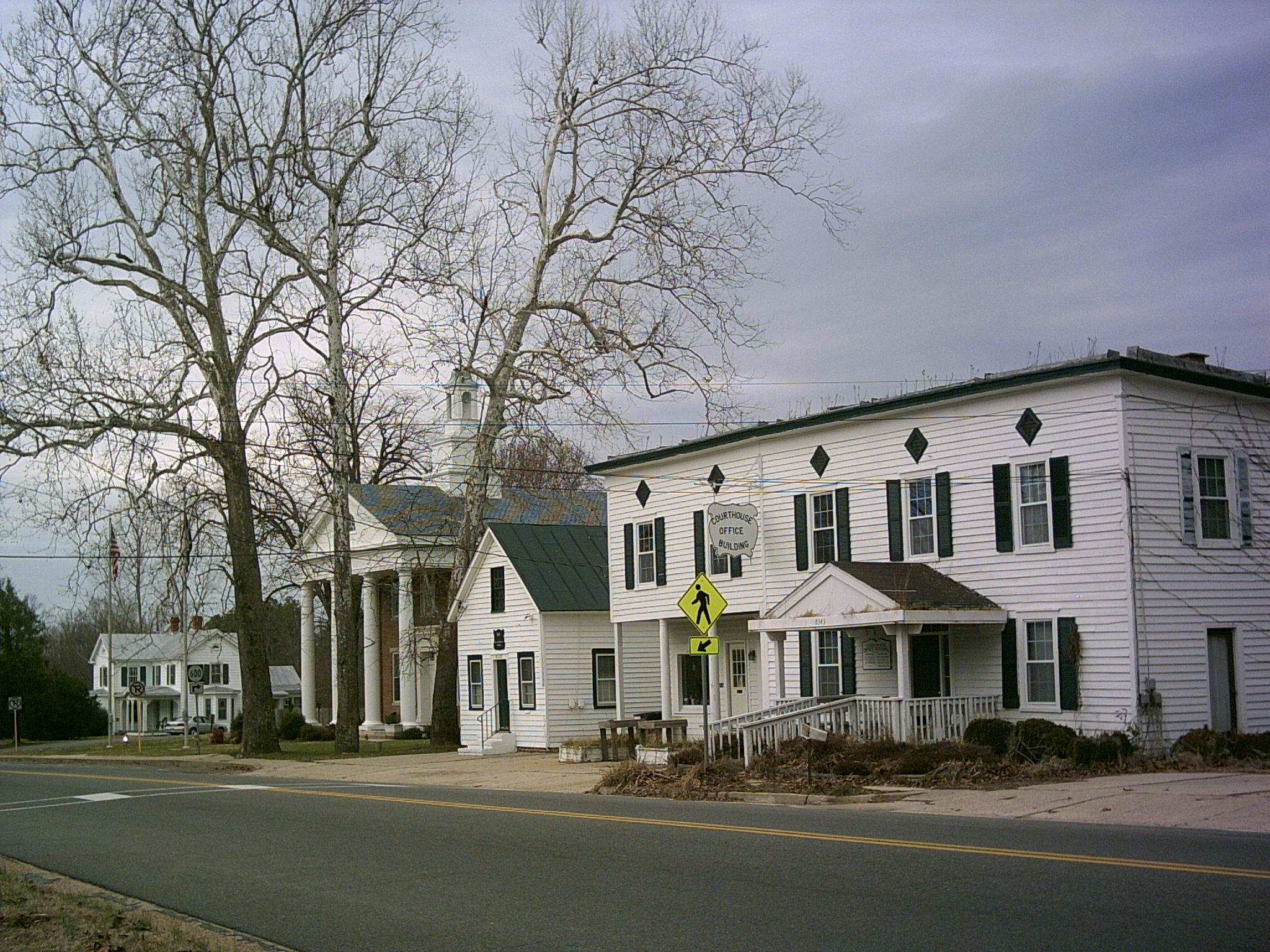
- View of the Lancaster Court House Historic District, including Lancaster Court House and the Steuart Blakemore Building

- Location within Virginia Location within the United States
- Interactive map showing the location of Lancaster Historic Court House District
- Location: VA 3, Lancaster, Virginia
- Coordinates: 37°46′11″N 76°27′53″W
- Area: 39 acres (16 ha)
- Architectural style: Mid 19th Century Revival, Late Victorian
- NRHP reference No.: 83003286
- VLR No.: 051-0081

Significant dates
- Added to NRHP: August 11, 1983
- Designated VLR: January 18, 1983

The Lancaster Court House Historic District is a national historic district consisting of 25 structures, including one monument, located in Lancaster, Virginia, Lancaster County, Virginia. Four of the buildings make up the Mary Ball Washington Museum and Library, founded in 1958, whose purpose is to preserve and interpret the history of Lancaster County, Virginia.

The Lancaster Court House Historic District was listed on the National Register of Historic Places in 1983.

== History ==
Lancaster County was formed from Northumberland County in 1651, and plans for a courthouse were prepared three years later, and it was built by William Norgham. Although the original Building's exact location is now unknown, it is assumed to have stood very near the Coromotan River, given the order referencing "ye building of a courthouse in Coromotan ..." and mentions an inlet. However, the location proved unpopular, so the courthouse was moved to land of Captain William Ball by 1698. It was moved again circa 1738, and the county seat in 1740. The current courthouse was opened in 1861 and built on what had once been the Upper Tavern. It was remodeled consistent with Thomas Jefferson's Roman Revival courthouse designs in 1937. The complex includes the old clerk's office and former jail, both dating back to the 18th century. The town itself was authorized in 1691 by Virginia's General Assembly, on the west side of the Corrotoman River. Furthermore, the county's records date back to the colonial period, unlike many Tidewater counties whose records were destroyed in the American Civil War, since Lancaster County avoided much devastation.

After the war, the county encouraged emigration, even distributing a pamphlet The Northern Neck of Virginia as a Home for Immigrants in Northern States, Canada and Europe. The 1872 Confederate memorial dates from this effort and is believed to be the first such monument erected in the Commonwealth. The historic district, essentially a linear village, also includes a tavern built circa 1800, a mid-19th-century post office, Carpenter-Gothic church, turn-of-the-century store, and many detached mid-19th-to-early-20th-century dwellings.

== Notable structures ==
- Clerk's Office *
- Confederate Monument
- Jail *
- Job Carter's Tavern (Cornwell House)
- Lancaster Court House
- Lancaster House *
- Steuart Blakemore Building (Old Post Office) *
- Trinity Episcopal Church

* Elements of the Mary Ball Washington Museum and Library

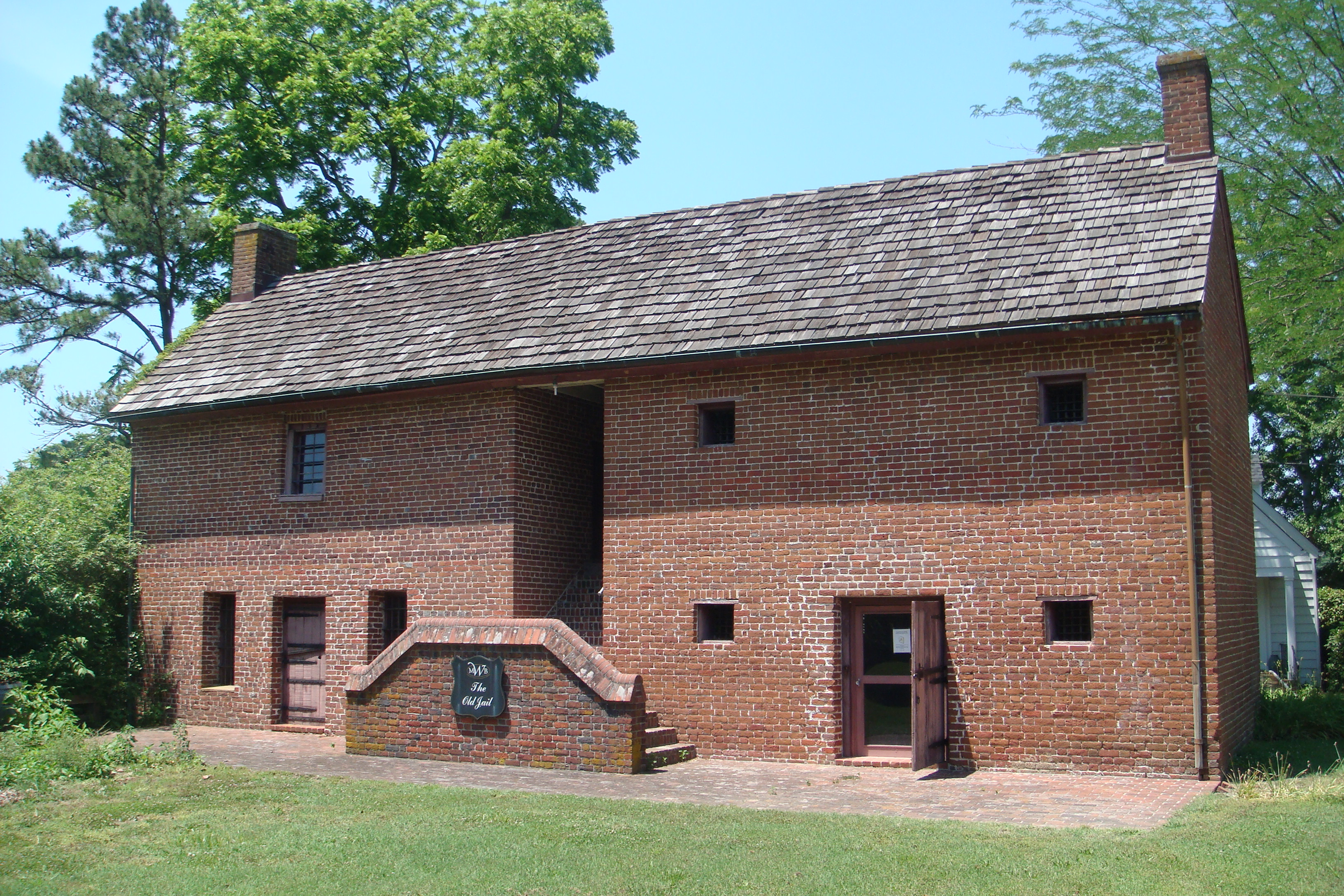
The Old Jail, Lancaster, Virginia

== See also ==
- National Register of Historic Places listings in Lancaster County, Virginia
