= William Ball (settler) =

English settler (1615–1680)

- Born: 1615; England
- Died: 1680 (aged 64–65); Colony of Virginia
- Known for: Great-grandfather of George Washington
- Spouse: Hannah "Atherold" (m. 1638)

William Ball (1615–1680) was an English settler in colonial Virginia. He was a farmer, militia officer, and one of the early leaders in Lancaster County. He is best known as the great-grandfather of George Washington.

== Early life ==
William Ball was born around 1615, possibly in Salisbury, Wiltshire, or Berkshire, England. He married a woman named Hannah (1615–1695) on July 2, 1638, in London, England; her maiden name is sometimes given as Atherold, but no primary documentation has confirmed this.

== Arrival in Virginia ==
William Ball likely arrived in the Virginia Colony by 1653. That year, a land certificate issued to Captain Henry Fleet lists Ball among the individuals he transported to Virginia. Ball is first officially recorded in Lancaster County on December 10, 1653, when he witnessed a deed. Throughout the 1650s, he was involved in local legal affairs, including witnessing the will of Arthur Dunn in 1655 and appearing in court in 1656 to affirm its validity.

By 1658, Ball appeared in the Lancaster County tithable lists, indicating he was an established landholder and taxpayer. In 1659, he was appointed as a county justice, reflecting his growing influence and role in local governance. Around 1663, Ball began acquiring significant landholdings in the county, laying the foundation for his plantation and status as a planter. His involvement in civic and legal matters from early on demonstrates his active participation in the colony’s development.

== Political career ==
William Ball was a prominent political and military figure in Lancaster County. He served as a member of the House of Burgesses, the colonial legislature, from 1670 until his death in 1680. Ball also held the position of presiding magistrate for Lancaster County and was involved in local judicial affairs, serving alongside notable contemporaries such as John Carter and Raleigh Travers.

In 1672, Ball received the title of Colonel and served as the County Lieutenant of Lancaster, overseeing the local militia. During this time, he participated in efforts to defend the colony against Native American attacks, including mobilizing men and horses as part of the response to conflicts such as Bacon’s Rebellion in the mid-1670s.

Ball was also involved in various county committees and courts, playing a key role in the administration and governance of Lancaster County during a formative period in Virginia’s colonial history.

== Children ==
William Ball and his wife Hannah had four known children:

- Col. Richard Ball (1639–1677), who settled in Maryland and died before his father’s will was made.
- Capt. William Ball II (1641–1694), who inherited the Millenbeck plantation.
- Joseph Ball (1649–1711), known as “Joseph of Epping Forest,” who was the father of Mary Ball Washington (1708–1789) and therefore grandfather of George Washington.
- Hannah Ball (1650–1695), who married Captain David Fox (1647–1702).
