= Nickens =

Nickens is a patronymic surname derived from the given name Nick.

- Armistead S. Nickens (1836–1906), American politician
- David Leroy Nickens
- Jared Nickens, American basketball player
- Mark Nickens, American basketball player
