= Belle Isle State Park =

Belle Isle State Park may refer to:

- Belle Isle Park (Michigan), formerly a Detroit city park
- Belle Isle State Park (Virginia)
