= Millenbeck, Virginia =

Unincorporated community in Virginia, United States

- Unincorporated community
- Location in Virginia Location in the United States
- Coordinates: 37°40′12″N 76°29′19″W
- Country: United States
- State: Virginia
- County: Lancaster
- Time zone: UTC−5 (Eastern (EST))
  - Summer (DST): UTC−4 (EDT)

Millenbeck is an unincorporated community in Lancaster County in the U.S. state of Virginia.

== History ==
Col. Joseph Matthäus Ball, grandfather of Gen. George Washington, was born in May 1649 in England, settled in Virginia during a period of population growth in the region when the Millenbeck community was in Northumberland County prior to the formation of Lancaster County.
