= Armistead S. Nickens =

American politician (1836–1906)

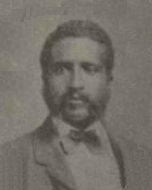

Member of the Virginia House of Delegates from Lancaster County
- In office December 6, 1871 – December 1, 1875
- Preceded by: John S. Chowning
- Succeeded by: T. Spicer Curlett

Personal details
- Born: Armistead Stokalas Nickens; July 1836 Lancaster County, Virginia, U.S.
- Died: April 26, 1906 (aged 69) Kilmarnock, Virginia, U.S.
- Party: Republican
- Spouse(s): Sophronia Wood; Violet Watkins

Armistead Stokalas Nickens (1836 – April 26, 1906) was an American Republican politician who served as a member of the Virginia House of Delegates, representing Lancaster County from 1871 to 1875. He was one of the first African-Americans to serve in Virginia's government.

== Early and family life ==
Nickens was born circa 1836 to Polly Weaver and her husband Armistead Nickens. His paternal ancestors included Richard and Chriss, freed by the will of John Carter Jr. in 1690. His maternal grandfather, Elijah Weaver, was a seaman during the American Revolutionary War. His father taught him to read and write, and he bought books and studied on his own. However, his father died in 1850, so young Armistead and his brother John probably began working at an early age. The 1850 census lists him as a laborer, and the 1860 census as a sawyer in Heathsville.

=== Marriages and family ===
Nickens married twice. His first wife, Sophronia Wood, was the daughter of the local miller, Charles C. Wood, but she died in 1869 or 1870, since the census of that year showed Nickens living with his mother Polly and his 5 year old son Holland and two year old daughter Sarah. His second wife, Violet Jones, whom he married on November 14, 1871, had grown up next door to the Nickens family (Her mother Mahala Jones raised seven children). They had twins Joseph and Josephine, and a daughter Sophronia.

== Career ==
Nickens supported his family as a laborer, and then as a sawyer. Lancaster County voters twice elected him as their representative in the Virginia House of Delegates. He introduced a bill for building a bridge over the Rapppahannock River at Tappahannock. After his legislative terms, Nickens received an appointment as collector of delinquent taxes. He also built the first schoolhouse for African Americans in Lancaster County.

== Death and legacy ==
Armistead Nickens died in 1906 and was buried in the family cemetery overlooking the Kamps and Carters Millpond. In 1990, a portrait of him was presented to the Lancaster Court, where it now hangs.

== See also ==
- African American officeholders from the end of the Civil War until before 1900

Virginia House of Delegates
Preceded by John S. Chowning	Virginia Delegate for Lancaster County; 1871–1875	Succeeded by T. Spicer Curlett
