= Mary Ball Washington House =

Historic house in Virginia, United States

- Mary Washington House
- U.S. National Register of Historic Places
- U.S. Historic district – Contributing property
- Virginia Landmarks Register
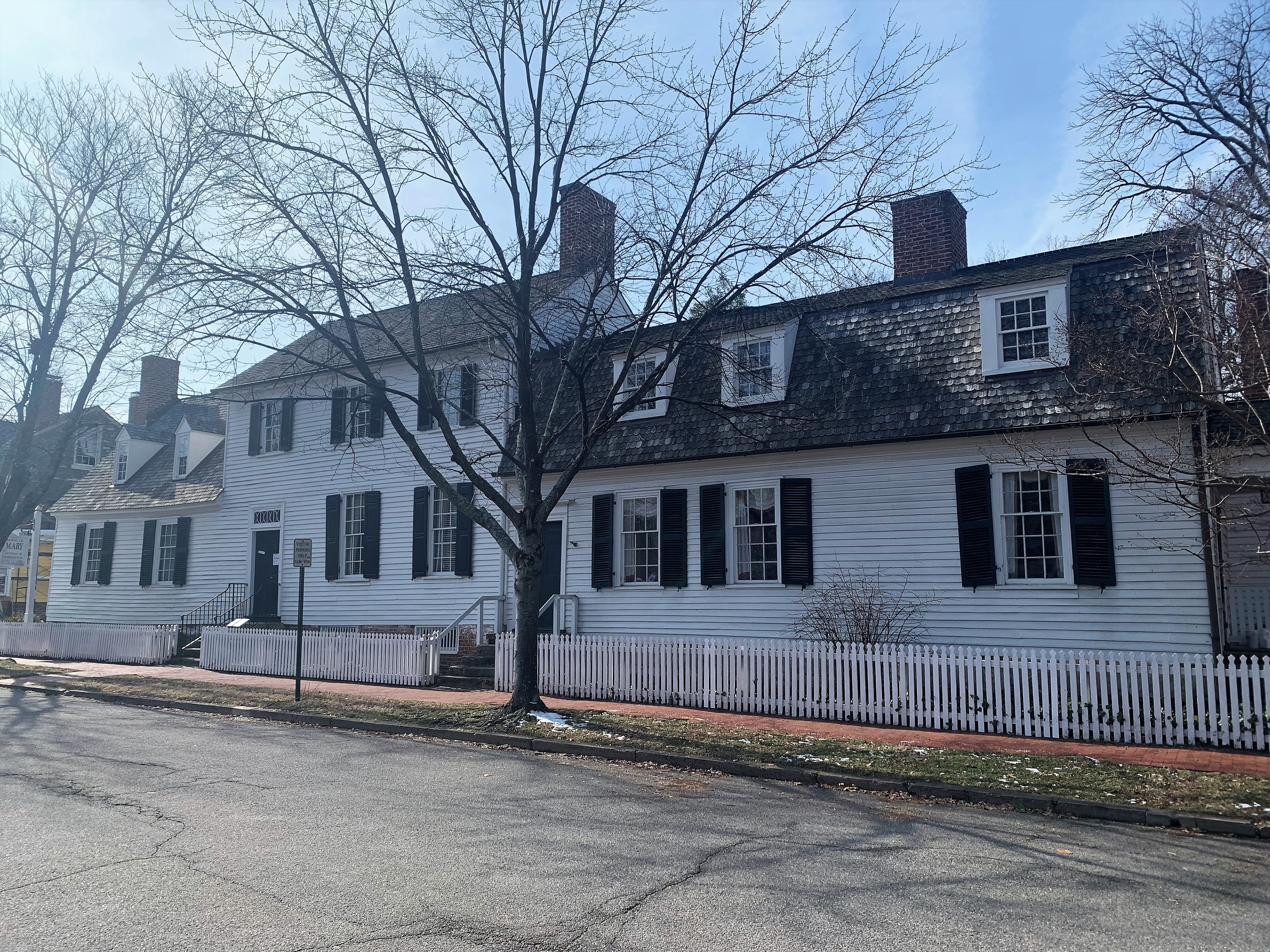
- Mary Washington House, February 2022

- Location within Northern Virginia Location within Virginia Location within the United States
- Location: 1200 Charles St., Fredericksburg, Virginia
- Coordinates: 38°18′17″N 77°27′49″W
- Area: 1 acre (0.40 ha)
- Part of: Fredericksburg Historic District (ID71001053)
- NRHP reference No.: 75002111
- VLR No.: 111-0110

Significant dates
- Added to NRHP: June 05, 1975
- Designated CP: September 22, 1971
- Designated VLR: March 18, 1975

The Mary Washington House, at 1200 Charles Street in Fredericksburg, Virginia, is the house in which George Washington's mother, Mary Ball Washington, resided towards the end of her life. It is now operated as an 18th-century period historic house museum, one of several museums in Fredericksburg operated by Washington Heritage Museums. Today it displays 18th-century furniture, and her personal possessions, such as her "best dressing glass” (her mirror).

== History ==
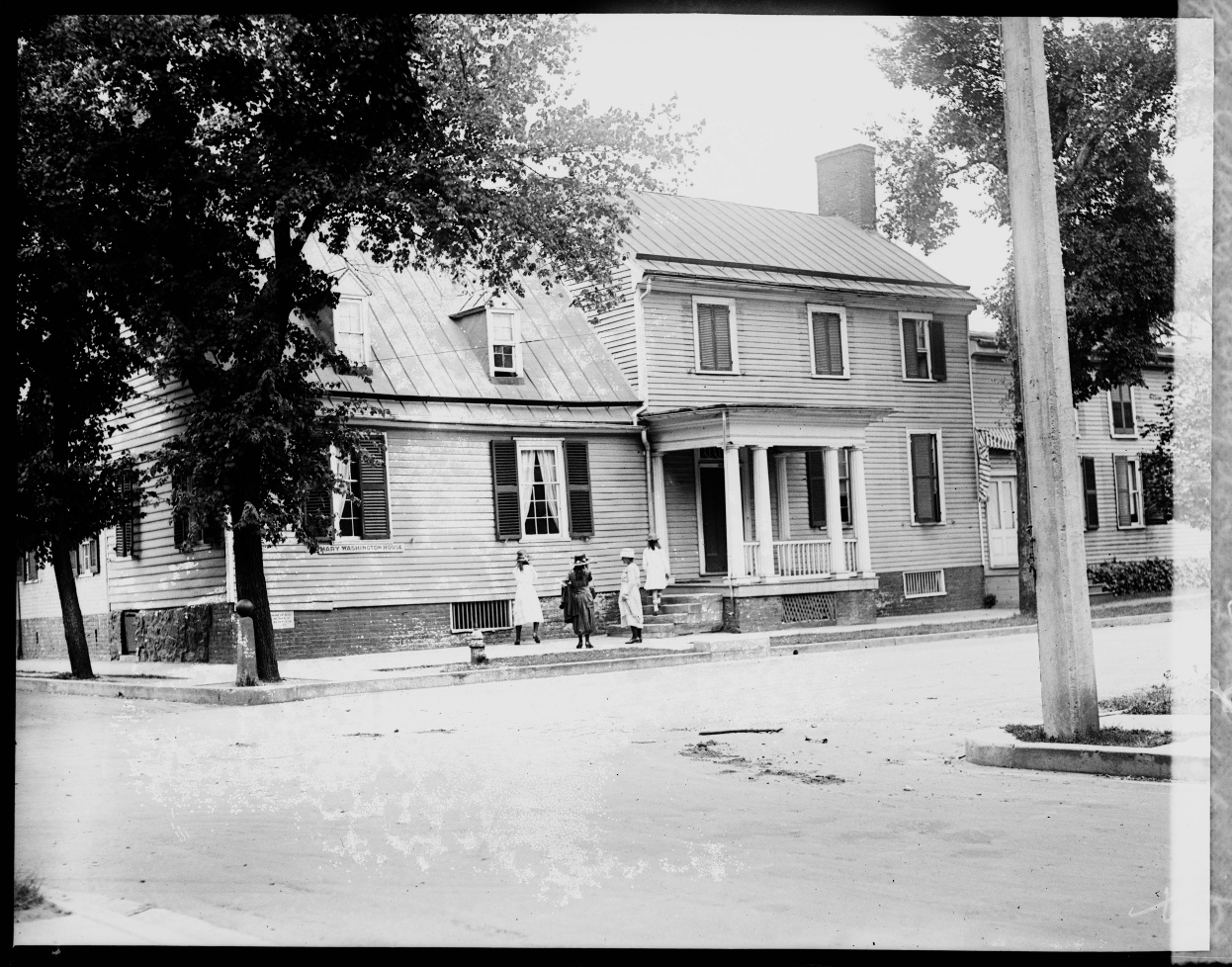
Mary Washington House in 1920

George Washington purchased this house for his mother from Micheal Robinson in Fredericksburg, Virginia in 1772 for 275 pounds. Mary Ball Washington spent her last 17 years in the white frame house that sites on the corner of Charles and Lewis Street. The house is located on 1200 Charles St Fredericksburg, Virginia. It was located close to her daughter Elizabeth Washington Lewis' home, Kenmore Plantation, and close to a town home owned by her younger son Charles Washington. In 1780, Charles moved to western Virginia (present day Charles Town, West Virginia) from Fredericksburg. At that point, the house—on the town's main street—was converted into a tavern. Today, as the Rising Sun Tavern, it is open as a building museum managed by the local Washington Heritage Museums group.

Later in his life, on his visits to Fredericksburg, George Washington was a frequent visitor to his mother's home, and, in April, 1789, came to this house to receive a blessing from his mother before his inauguration. A visit to Mrs. Washington in her home became a regular stop for distinguished visitors to Fredericksburg. Among those stopping by to pay their respects were John Marshall, George Mason, Thomas Jefferson, Marquis de Lafayette, and members of the Lee family. She lived in this home until her death later in 1789.

The Mary Washington House is located near the college named for her, the University of Mary Washington.

The house is currently a museum for tourists to visit and view. Within the house itself, Mary's bedroom, and parlor room from a later addition can be found on the first floor. The second floor contains two bedrooms and a small room dedicated to the history of its preservation. The gardens are available for self-guided tours. Tourists are able to visit a kitchen building built in 1804, several decades after Mary's death, and can look at, but not enter several other replica buildings; a wellhouse, and an interpretation of the original kitchen from the 18th century (In reality, it would have been farther north than its current location). Tourists are able to go in the Mary Washington House Gift Shop, which is believed to have originally been a dining room from a period of the late 18th century when it was used as a boys' school, due to its proximity to where the original kitchen would have been.

== Preservation ==
In 1891, the Association for the Preservation of Virginia Antiquities acquired the house, which was scheduled to be disassembled for travel to the Chicago World's Fair for display. It was their second property acquisition, and the location where the Fredericksburg Branch was chartered. The house underwent a restoration and was opened to the public for tours. The APVA recovered 8 objects original to the house, including a mirror Mary Washington once labeled her "best dressing glass". By the later Twentieth Century, APVA had become Preservation Virginia and that organization signed an agreement with the newly created and Fredericksburg-based "Washington Heritage Museums" group, to cede ownership of the property to the later group by 2013. The site is a landmark in that City.
