= Joseph Ball (Virginia public servant) =

Virginian public servant

- Born: Joseph Ball; May 24, 1649; Halifax, West Yorkshire, England
- Died: July 11, 1711 (aged 62); Lancaster County, Virginia, British America
- Occupations: justice, vestryman, lieutenant colonel, Burgess
- Spouses: Elizabeth Rogers or Romney (first); Mrs. Mary Johnson (second)
- Children: Anne, Elizabeth, Esther or Easter, Hannah, Joseph, Mary
- Parent(s): William Ball; Hannah Atherold
- Relatives: George Washington (grandson)

Joseph Ball (May 24, 1649 – July 11, 1711) was an English-born justice, vestryman, lieutenant colonel, and Burgess in the Colony of Virginia.

Ball was the father of Mary Ball Washington and the maternal grandfather of George Washington, the First President of the United States.

== Early life ==
Ball was born on May 2, 1649, in England to William Ball (1615–1680) and Hannah Atherold (1615–1695). His father emigrated to Virginia in 1657 becoming a trader and planter, eventually settling with his family in Millenbeck, Virginia.

== Settlement in Virginia colony ==
He moved to the Colony of Virginia sometime before 1680. He lived at the Epping Forest plantation in Lancaster County, Virginia. Ball served as justice in the county court, a vestryman for his church parish, and as a lieutenant colonel in the county militia. Ball was a representative in the Virginia House of Burgesses, serving in 1698, 1700, and 1702.

== Personal life ==
Ball married twice. His first marriage was to Elizabeth Rogers (or Romney) (1655–1703), with whom he had five children: Hannah Ball (1683–1748), Elizabeth Ball (1684–1711), Esther or Easter Ball (1685–1751), Anne Ball (1686–1764), and Joseph Ball (1689–1760).

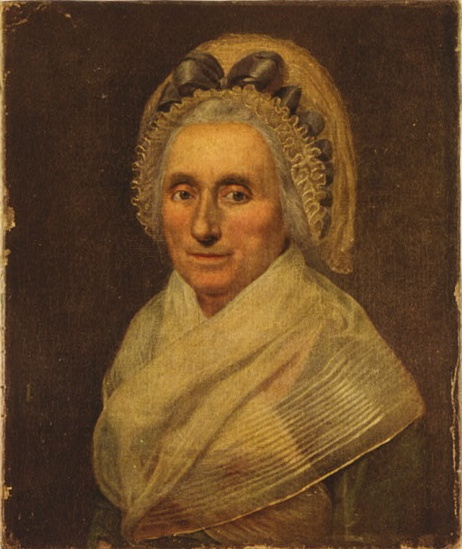
Joseph and Mary's daughter Mary Ball, the mother of George Washington.

After her death, Ball married the widow Mary Johnson (1672–1721), who had two children from her previous marriage. Joseph and Mary Ball's only child was Mary Ball, born about 1708. Joseph Ball died on July 11, 1711, and is buried in Saint Mary's Whitechapel Episcopal Churchyard in Lancaster County, Virginia.

== See also ==
- Washington family
