= Village of Morattico Historic District =

Historic district in Virginia, United States

- U.S. National Register of Historic Places
- U.S. Historic district
- Virginia Landmarks Register
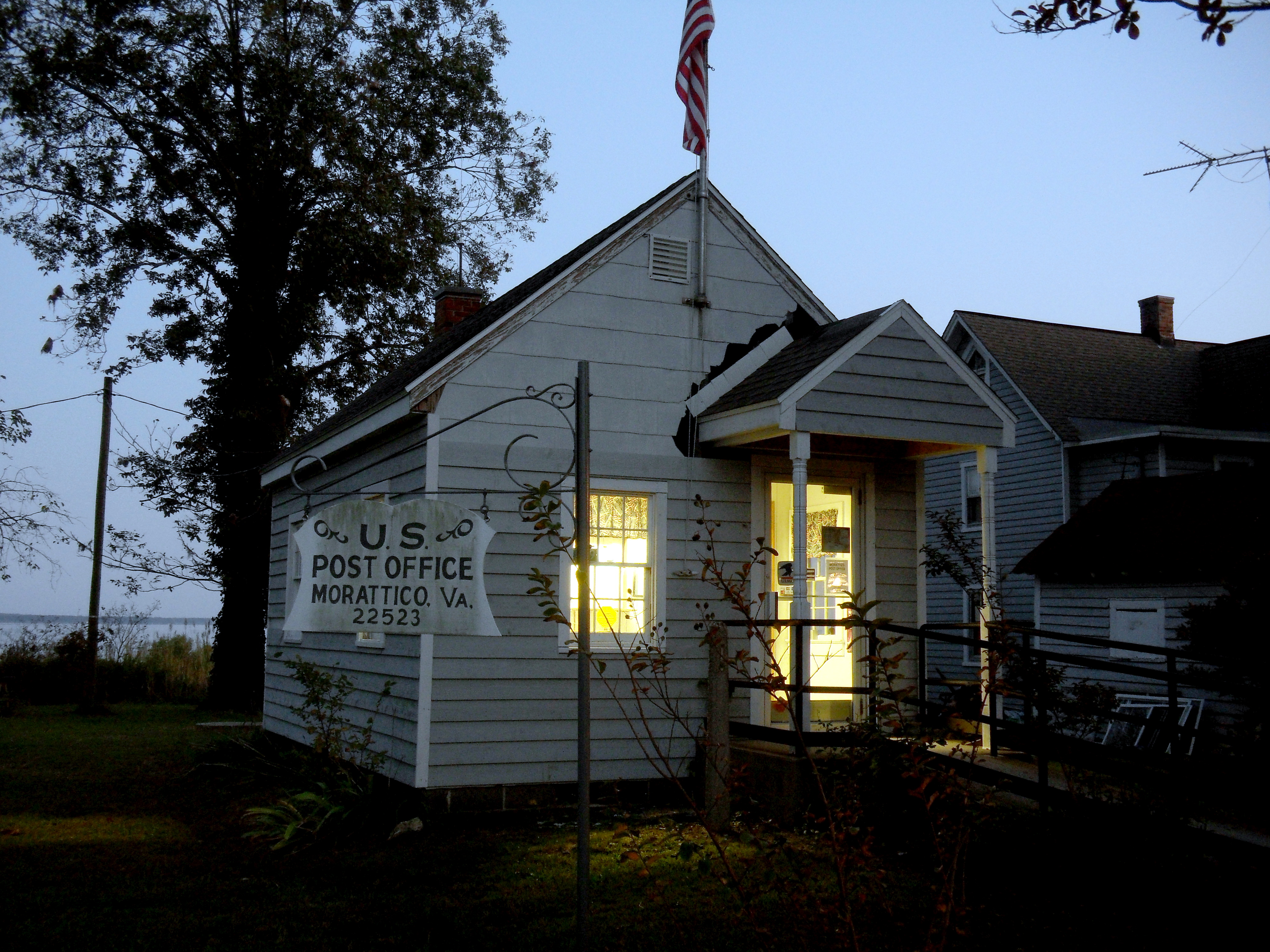
- U.S. Post Office in Morattico

- Location within Virginia Location within the United States
- Location: Portions of Morattico Rd., Riverside, & Saltwater Drs., Church, & Sea Shell Lns., Mulberry Creek, & Water View Rds., Morattico, Virginia
- Coordinates: 37°47′21″N 76°37′45″W
- Area: 200 acres (81 ha)
- Architect: multiple
- NRHP reference No.: 11000857
- VLR No.: 051-5223

Significant dates
- Added to NRHP: November 22, 2011
- Designated VLR: September 20, 2010

Village of Morattico Historic District is a national historic district located at Morattico, Lancaster County, Virginia. The district encompasses 69 contributing buildings, 1 contributing site, and 3 contributing structures in the village of Morattico. The district includes residential, commercial, and institutional buildings in a community whose economy was based on water-borne transportation, seafood extraction, and seafood processing. The village developed after 1890. Notable buildings include the Morattico General Store (c. 1890), Dr. Lewis' Office (c. 1910), Morattico Post Office (1949), Jackson Seafood (1950), Shelton Crab House, and Emmanuel United Methodist Church (1898).

It was listed on the National Register of Historic Places in 2011.
