= Belle Isle State Park (Virginia) =

State park in Virginia, USA

Belle Isle State Park, Virginia, USA
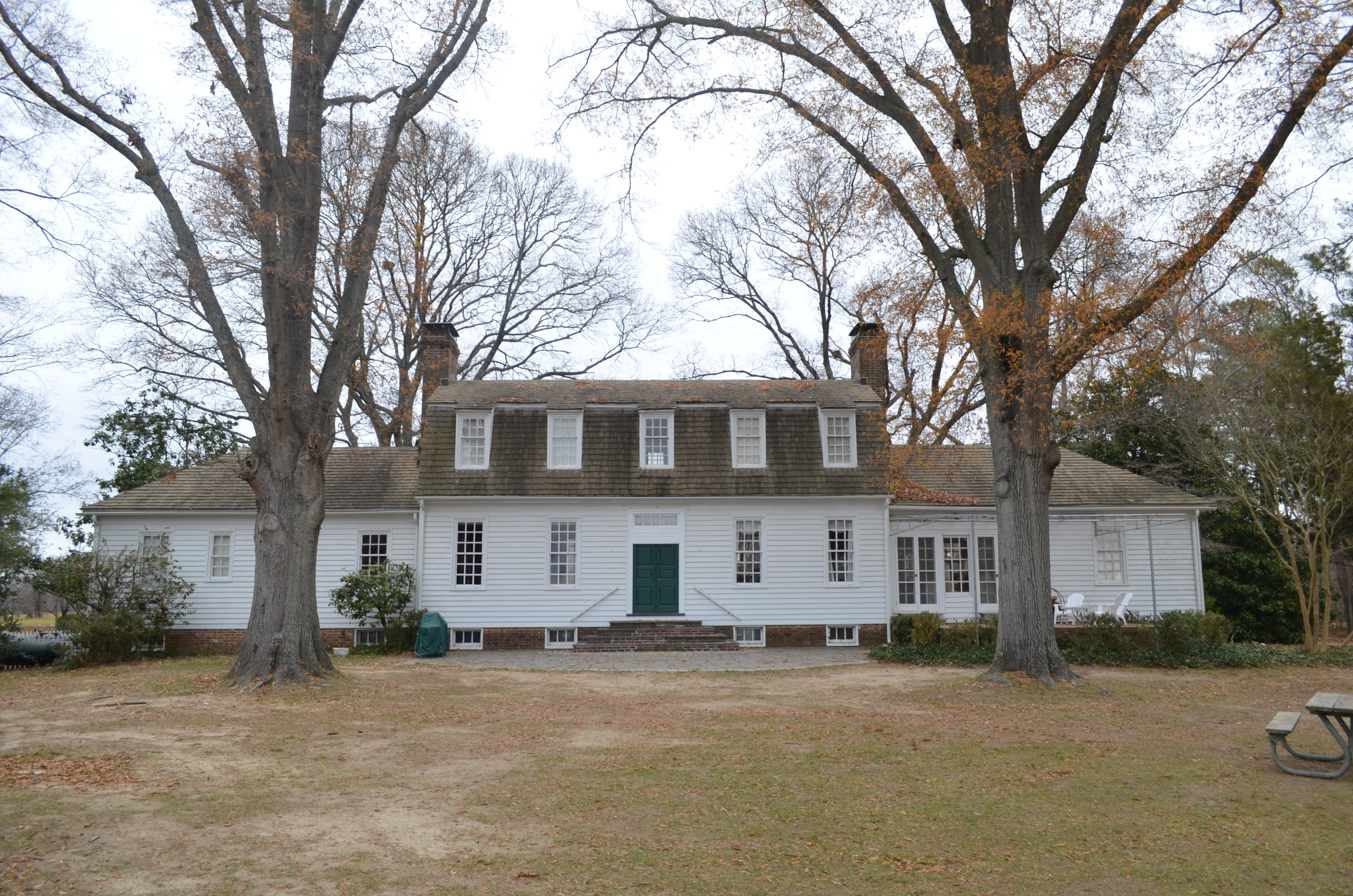
- 2012 photo of Bel Air Mansion on park grounds

- Location within Virginia Location within the United States
- Location: Lancaster County, Virginia
- Coordinates: 37°46′28″N 76°35′58″W
- Area: 892 acres (361 ha)
- Established: 1993
- Visitors: 44,502 (in 2015)
- Governing body: Virginia Department of Conservation and Recreation

Belle Isle State Park is located in Lancaster County, Virginia, on the Rappahannock River. It sits between Deep Creek and Morattico Creek and is currently under public ownership. The park has an area of 892 acres (3.61 km^{2}) and has facilities for camping, fishing, boating and picnics. As of 2015, the yearly visitation was 44,502.

The park is a peninsula surrounded by Tidewater coastal marshes. Wildlife observed includes blue herons, osprey, hawks, bald eagles, white-tailed deer and various reptiles and amphibians. It is near the unincorporated towns of Litwalton, Morattico and Somers.

== History ==
Two years after English settlers moved into the Northern Neck in 1650, Thomas Powell (d. 1670) patented 500 acres of land including the small peninsula protruding into the Rappahannock River between Deep Creek and Mulberry (or Mud) Creek, and patented another 700 acres on the west side of the Corotoman River eight years later, so the area became known as "Powell's Quarter." Powell farmed using indentured workers and possibly some enslaved people. In 1663 he was taxed for 16 people (thus was one of the county's largest employers), then in 1659 was named one of the justices of the peace who jointly governed the new County. He had at least two children by his first wife (including Thomas Powell Jr.), and after her death imported his second wife, Jane Catesby from England, under a contract which promised her 200 pounds sterling and one third of his 500 acre plantation on the Rappahannock River. Their young son Rawleigh Powell (1670-1692) inherited that plantation when his father died, with his elder half brother Thomas Powell Jr. (who had already received substantial gifts from his wealthy father) as his guardian and executor. However, Thomas Powell Jr. died unmarried and without a will before Rawleigh reached adulthood, so his mother's new husband, John Kyrby (d. 1798) took on those responsibilities. Despite some legal entanglements, Kyrby eventually managed the land that became Belle Isle for two decades, and inherited it from Rawleigh who died unmarried at age 21. Rawleigh's sister Anne married Rev. Charles Dacres (d. 1797) of North Farnham parish, and after his death remarried and sold her part of the divided property to William Loyd of what would soon become Richmond County

French Huguenot refugee and Anglican minister John Bertrand (1651-1701) purchased Powell's Quarter from Loyd subject to a mortgage in 1692. He, his son William and daughter Mary Anne and their descendants operated not only the plantation but a store at Deep Creek for nearly a century. After education in France, John Bertrand had immigrated to London in 1677, and was a chaplain and tutor to a French nobleman for several years before marrying Charlotte Jolly (1659-1721). The couple sailed for Virginia in the fall of 1687. Rev. Bertrand became the minister of North Farnham parish that year and added a second nearby assignment, to St. Mary's Church Whitechapel, in 1690. Rev. Bertrand also became the tutor for the sons of prominent lawyer and planter William Fitzhugh, who was one of two local agents of the Northern Neck Proprietary, and who would before the decade's end be involved in legal disputes with the other agent, powerful planter and politician Robert (King) Carter. Rev. Bertrand's father-in-law, the Sieur d'Esnaux, and family were prominent merchants in Cozes (Charlotte's brother Jean Jolly was the Seigneur de Chadignac by 1692). After the Proprietary prevailed over Carter, in 1698 Fitzhugh issued a new patent which enlarged Bertrand's plantation from 500 acres to 924 acres. Thus in the last years before the paterfamilias' death, the Bertrands began developing the Deep Creek port and store, as well as expanding their labor force with indentured servants and enslaved Africans. His then underage son William (b. 1688) would inherit and eventually came to run the plantation as well as became the county's tobacco inspector, and his widow (and sole executor) Charlotte (d. 1721) as well as sister Mary Ann (1690-1750, who survived and inherited money and property from three husbands) ran the store and overseas mercantile business. William Bertrand married fellow second-generation Huguenot Susannah Foushee in 1713, daughter of Charlotte's good friends and neighbors James and Marie Foushee, and they had a daughter who married Col. Cyrus Griffin and had several children who survived. However, rioters burned the tobacco warehouse in 1732 and after rebuilding by 1738, Deep Creek stopped being a public facility.

In 1761, Thomas Betrand Griffin inherited the plantation he named Belle Isle (and 28 enslaved Africans) from his grandfather William Bertrand. A year before that inheritance (Rev. Betrand's will had established an entail on the main property, requiring it be kept intact and inherited by the eldest male), he and his grandfather had signed a 3-party deed with prominent merchant, politician and planter Charles Hill Carter to insulate the plantation from creditors and debts incurred by relatives (MaryAnn's sons and their half-siblings) who had moved to Prince William County further up the Potomac River and established a trading post and ironworks near Dumfries, which went bankrupt. In 1766, William Bertrand married well, to Judith Burwell of Carter's Grove plantation near the colony's capital. Judith's father Carter Burwell was a grandson of Robert (King) Carter, so any inter-family dispute had long ended. However, the marriage proved short. By November 1769, Judith as well as the son and daughter she had borne in that marriage were all dead. Thomas B. Griffin would continue to remember his wife in his own will and never remarried, but kept busy with other duties, including as lieutenant colonel of the local militia, clerk of the Lancaster County Court and vestryman of the local church.

He also let his youngest brother, the London-educated lawyer Cyrus Griffin and his (eloped) wife, Lady Christina Stuart, live at Belle Isle, and soon gave them the adjacent 75 acre Newby tract. They periodically returned for the next three decades, and were the last Bertrand family residents at the plantation, although Cyrus Griffin's political, diplomatic and judicial duties often called him away.

However, upon Thomas B. Griffin's death in 1778, the main Belle Isle plantation was inherited by their eldest surviving brother, Dr. Corbin Griffin (1741-1813). Trained as a surgeon, and like his brothers active in the patriot cause (initially as a ship's surgeon, then at the naval hospital near Yorktown), he put the plantation up for sale in 1778, under a new Virginia law which permitted breaking entails, although he himself was soon a prisoner of war, captured by Gen. Cornwallis' British forces while trying to escape Yorktown. He finally sold the plantation with the assistance of his brother Cyrus Griffin to prominent Middlesex county planter Ralph Wormeley IV (1750-1790) in 1782 for 5000 pound sterling. Wormeley intended it as a present for his daughter Mary and her husband Nathaniel Burwell, although they never took up residence and Burwell sold the plantation to former Lancaster Committee of Safety member Rawleigh Downman in 1786. Meanwhile, the other Griffin brothers were similarly military and patriotic: Leroy Griffin Jr. (militia major who died in 1775), Samuel Griffin (colonel during the war, late legislator and member of the state board of war in 1781) and William Griffin (colonel in 1771). Fourteen of John and Charlotte Bertrand's 18 great-grandsons supported the patriot cause. Their cousins Jessee Ewell was on the Prince William Committee of Safety, commanded the county militia and became a delegate representing Fairfax County in 1777 (with his brother James as major of militia), and their cousin John Ballandine had an important iron foundry near the James River in Henrico County at Westham that British raiders under Benedict Arnold destroyed in the conflict.

Meanwhile, by 1767, Thomas B. Griffin had a Georgian style mansion built on the estate. After Rawleigh Downman (1762-1838) purchased the property and constructed two wings before 1818, when he insured the property. Downman's descendants (including 2 others with the same name) continued to operate as a plantation using enslaved labor until the American Civil War.

== Modern history ==
In 1918, Belle Isle was bought by the Somers family, which used it to sore grain and livestock. They sold paneling and interior decor to Henry Francis DuPont of Delaware for $1000, and it is now on display at the Winterthur Museum. In 1939, Herbert Lee Boatwright and his wife Suzanne (formerly Pollard) bought the historic Belle Isle mansion. They hired Thomas Tileston Waterman, the first director of the Historic American Buildings Survey, to supervise the restoration, which included reproductions of the now-Winterthur paneling . The house was placed on the National Register of Historic Places in 1971. Edward and Rosemary Gruis purchased the house and surrounding Belle Isle farm in 1980, and planned to subdivide all but the house itself and 90 acres.

Meanwhile, in 1940, John G. Pollard and his wife Peggy also hired Thomas T. Waterman to build Bel Air mansion on the property. It reflects the Colonial Revival style and used cypress trees from the Belle Isle farm. Some interior accents were repurposed from a colonial era house in King and Queen County formerly built for Carter Braxton. Funds from the 1992 Virginia Park and Recreational Facilities Bond Act purchased 675 acres on the Rappahannock River slated for development. Thus in 1993 was formed the core of Belle Isle State Park in 1993, with the Bel Air house and former farmland (some of which continues to be farmed). The more historic Belle Isle house (although surrounded by the park), was purchased from the Gruis family in 2015 and protected from development, but not currently open to the public.

== Facilities and attractions ==
Bel Air can be rented for overnight stays, as can a guest cottage nearby. The park also is an International Dark Skies park and periodically hosts night-time gatherings of stargazers and docents, either outdoors or partially indoors during wintertime and inclement weather. Its campgrounds include RV hookups, as well as simpler tent sites (some accessible only by water), and some rentable trailers. In addition to the boat launch for private watercraft, and rental canoes and kayaks are also available. The trail system includes a mix of hiking-only and multi-use trails for hiking, biking, and horseback riding.

== See also ==
- List of Virginia state parks
