= Epping Forest (Lancaster County, Virginia) =

Plantation in Lancaster County, Virginia

Coordinates: 37°47′38.4″N 76°32′2.4″W

Epping Forest is a historic plantation in Lancaster County, Virginia. The estate was owned by the Ball family and was the birthplace of Mary Ball Washington, the mother of George Washington, and Congressman Joseph Chinn.

== History ==
Epping Forest was built around 1690 in Lancaster County, just outside of Nuttsville, for Joseph Ball. He named the estate after the Epping Forest in Essex, England. The house was built with hand-hewned logs upon a Flemish bond brick foundation. The plantation included barns, carriage houses, sheds, a smokehouse, and an icehouse.

The plantation was the birthplace of Ball's daughter, Mary Ball Washington, who was the mother of George Washington. After her father's death in 1711, she moved away from the plantation.

An additional wing was added to the house in 1842. That decade, the home was enlarged with Federal style detailing.

A family cemetery is located on the property.

The estate was also called Forest Plantation.

In 1953, James deJarnette Jesse and Eoline Ball founded Epping Forest Antiques, which operated out of the houses's dining room.

In 1958, members of the Washington family attempted to make the house a historical shrine, but the plan never came into fruition.

A historical marker was erected nearby the plantation by the Virginia Conservation Commission in 1950 to mark the birthplace of George Washington’s mother.
