= Mary Ball Washington =

Mother of the first President of the United States

Mary Washington
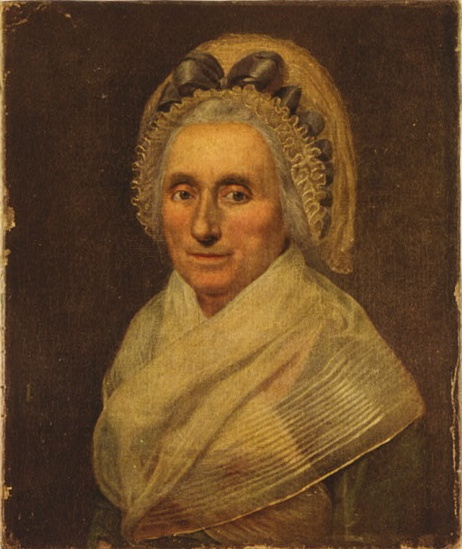
- Portrait by Robert Edge Pine, c. 1786
- Born: Mary Ball c. 1707 – c. 1709; Lancaster County, Virginia
- Died: August 25, 1789 (aged ~80); Fredericksburg, Virginia, U.S.
- Resting place: Kenmore Plantation and Gardens
- Spouse: Augustine Washington (m. 1731; died 1743)
- Children: George; Elizabeth; Samuel; John Augustine; Charles; Mildred
- Parents: Joseph Ball (father); Mary Montague (mother)
- Relatives: Bushrod Washington (grandson)

Mary Washington (née Ball; c. 1707 – c. 1709 – August 25, 1789) was an American planter best known for being the mother of the first president of the United States, George Washington. The second wife of Augustine Washington, she became a prominent member of the Washington family. She spent a large part of her life in Fredericksburg, Virginia, where several monuments were erected in her honor and a university, along with other public buildings, bear her name.

== Early life ==
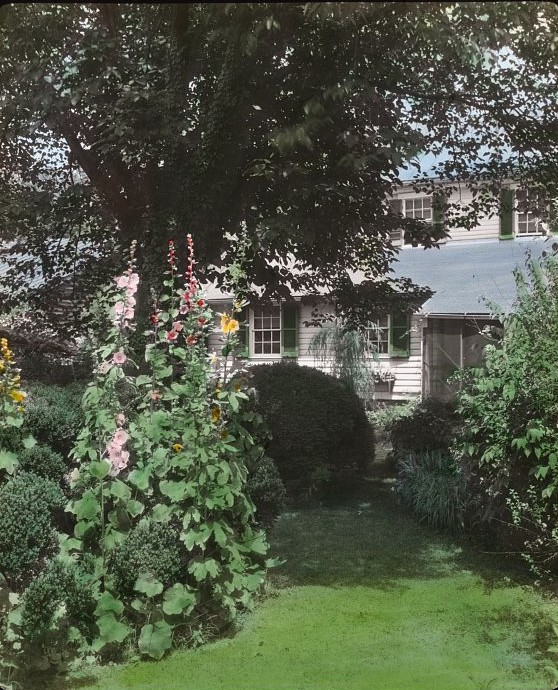
Mary Ball Washington House, 1200 Charles Street, Fredericksburg, by Frances Benjamin Johnston, 1927. The house was originally built in 1761 and has later additions.

Mary Ball was born sometime between 1707 and 1709 at either Epping Forest, her family's plantation in Lancaster County, Virginia, or at a plantation near the village of Simonson, Virginia. She was the only child of Col. Joseph Ball (1649–1711) and his second wife, Mary Johnson Ball (1672–1721). Her paternal grandfather was William Ball (1615–1680) who left Britain for Virginia in the 1650s. His wife, Hannah Atherold (1615–1695), arrived later along with their four children, including Mary's father Joseph, who had been born in England. Her father died when she was three and after her mother's death in 1721, at the age of twelve Mary Ball was placed under the guardianship of Jane Washington's brother, the lawyer George Eskridge. In their wills Washington's parents left her with "property and slaves".

== Married life ==
Augustine Washington had sailed to England on business (and to visit his sons who had been sent to school there) but on his return, he discovered that his first wife, Jane Butler Washington, had died. George Eskridge supposedly arranged an introduction between his friend, Washington, and his ward Mary Ball, and the two married on March 6, 1731, when Mary was 23. She was wealthy by the standards of the day and brought at least 1000 acres of inherited property to the marriage. The couple had the following children:

- George Washington (1732–1799)
- Elizabeth "Betty" Washington (1733–1797)
- Samuel Washington (1734–1781)
- John Augustine Washington (1736–1787)
- Charles Washington (1738–1799)
- Mildred Washington (1739–1740)

Augustine died in 1743 when his son George was 11 years old. Unlike most widows in Virginia at the time, Mary Ball Washington never remarried. When George was 14, his older half-brother Lawrence Washington, arranged for young George to become a midshipman in the Royal Navy. However, Mary's half-brother, Joseph Ball (1689–1760), wrote in reply to her letter requesting advice, that the Navy would "cut and staple him and use him like a negro, or rather, like a dog."

Mary managed the family estate and 276 acres of Ferry Farm (a plantation) with the help of others until her eldest son came of age and well beyond. She lived to see that her son, George Washington, commanded the Continental Army to independence and was inaugurated as the first president of the United States in 1789. After learning that he had been elected president in April 1789, George Washington traveled from Mount Vernon to visit his mother in Fredericksburg. He knew his mother was suffering from breast cancer, the disease to which she eventually succumbed.

It is said that Mrs. Washington informed her son of her poor health and expected to die soon. Further, the story continues, that her son George said that he would need to decline to serve as president. George's mother Mary responded, saying, "But go, George, fulfill the high destinies which Heaven appears to have intended for you for; go, my son, and may that Heaven's and a mother's blessing be with you always."

== Death ==
After a lengthy illness, on August 25, 1789, Mary Ball Washington died of breast cancer at her home in Fredericksburg, Virginia.

She is buried near Meditation Rock in an unmarked grave which was located on the grounds of the Kenmore plantation, the former home of her daughter and son-in-law. The exact location of her grave is currently unknown. Kenmore is open to the public and operated as a historic house museum by the "George Washington Foundation."

== Beliefs ==
While there is a legend that Mrs. Washington was said to be openly opposed to her son's revolutionary politics and, according to French officers based in Virginia during the war she was a Loyalist sympathizer, there is no credible source to support that legend. The facts are that other than her son George who was Commander in Chief of the Continental forces (Army and Navy), Mary's other three sons Samuel, John Augustine, and Charles, all served in the Virginia Militia. Her son-in-law Fielding Lewis (husband to her daughter Betty), was in charge of the Fredericksburg Gunnery or Gun Manufactory. The gunnery works made muskets for use by American Revolutionary forces, and ended up almost bankrupting Lewis in the process. During the Revolutionary War, Mary Washington met the Marquis de Lafayette at her home in Fredericksburg. The two enjoyed a warm relationship for the remainder of her life.

Another legend about Mary Washington was that she petitioned the Government of Virginia claiming, in response to a Virginia government notice to citizens to do so, asking to be reimbursed for farm animals, horses and cattle that she gave to support the American war effort. No such petition was ever presented to the Virginia House of Delegates. Speaker Benjamin Harrison V wrote to George Washington in 1781 about a rumor that Mary Washington was going to submit a petition. At that time Mary Washington was experiencing economic challenges and was mourning the deaths of her son-in-law Fielding Lewis and her son Samuel Washington. George purchased a house for her in Fredericksburg, two blocks from Kenmore, where George's sister Betty (Mrs. Fielding Lewis) lived. Mary lived in her home nearby from 1772 until her death in 1789. She left George the majority of her lands and belongings, appointing him executor of her Will.

== Descendants ==
Her third son, John Augustine Washington, was the father of Bushrod Washington, who was nominated by President John Adams to the U.S. Supreme Court, and confirmed by the Senate in 1798. Charles Town, West Virginia, is named for her fourth son, Charles Washington.

== Legacy and honors ==
- Several monuments have been erected to Mary Ball Washington in Fredericksburg, Virginia, where she lived from 1772 until her death in 1789.
- The Mary Washington House in Fredericksburg has been preserved by Preservation Virginia (formerly known as the Association for the Preservation of Virginia Antiquities) who, in mid-2012, signed an agreement passing ownership to the "Washington Heritage Museums." The residence is open to the public and operated as a historic house museum. It contains a fine collection of antique furnishings, some with Washington family provenance.
- A monument to Mary Ball Washington was erected in 1833 and dedicated by President Andrew Jackson. It was left unfinished until the National Society Daughters of the American Revolution, a women's organization formed in the late nineteenth century raised money for the monument. The National Mary Washington Memorial Association used social events and balls to raise money for the cause. The new memorial was dedicated by President Grover Cleveland in 1894 near her possible grave site.
- The University of Mary Washington, a public university in Fredericksburg, Virginia, was named for her.
- The Mary Washington Hospital, located in Fredericksburg, is named for her.
- In November 2019, the Fredericksburg Nationals minor league baseball team introduced a Mary Washington logo at an event at the Mary Washington House on her 311th birthday, describing the logo as "the first female logo in baseball history to be a part of a team's permanent and original branding."

== See also ==
- Mary Washington House
- St. Mary's, Whitechapel
- Mary Ball Washington Museum and Library
- The SS Mary Ball was a World War II Liberty ship.
- Washington family
