= Lancaster, Virginia =

Unincorporated community in Virginia, United States

- Census-designated place
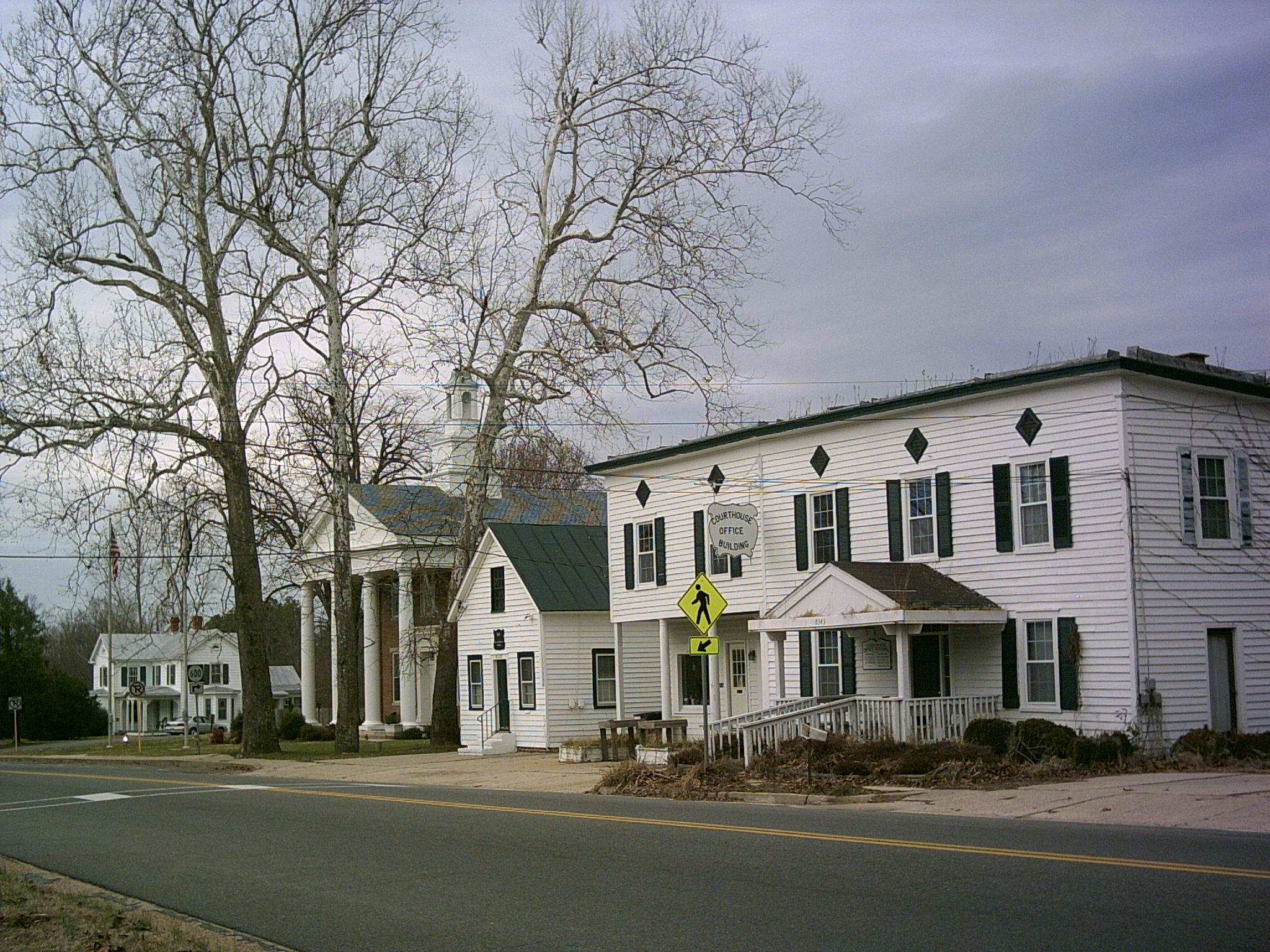
- Central Lancaster, with the courthouse and offices visible

- Location in Virginia Location in the United States
- Coordinates: 37°46′11″N 76°27′59″W
- Country: United States
- State: Virginia
- County: Lancaster

Area
  - Total: 2.20 sq mi (5.71 km^{2})
  - Land: 2.20 sq mi (5.69 km^{2})
  - Water: 0.0077 sq mi (0.02 km^{2})

Population (2020)
  - Total: 105
  - Density: 47.8/sq mi (18.45/km^{2})
- Time zone: UTC−5 (Eastern (EST))
  - Summer (DST): UTC−4 (EDT)
- ZIP Code: 22503
- FIPS code: 51-43704
- GNIS feature ID: 1498502

Lancaster is an unincorporated community and census-designated place (CDP) in Lancaster County, Virginia, United States. It is the county seat, and is also known as Lancaster Courthouse or by an alternative spelling, Lancaster Court House. The community was first drawn as a CDP prior to the 2020 census and had a population of 105 at the said census.

Lancaster lies along Virginia State Route 3, 23 miles (37 km) southeast of Warsaw and 7 miles (11 km) northwest of Kilmarnock, the largest community in Lancaster County.

Belle Isle and the Lancaster Court House Historic District are listed on the National Register of Historic Places.
