= Corrotoman River =

River in Virginia, U.S.

Coordinates: 37°40′0″N 76°28′45″W

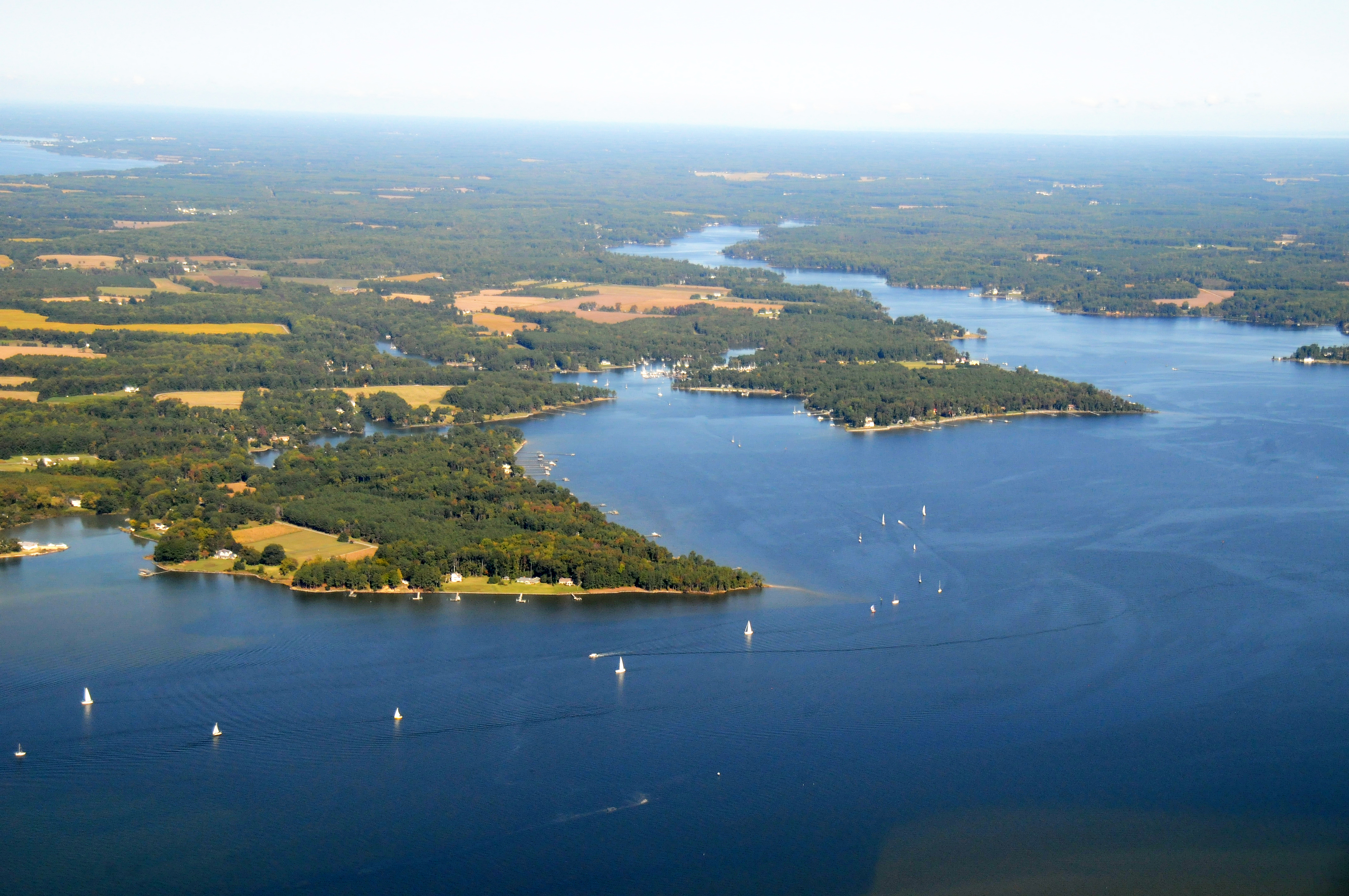

Location
- Country: United States of America
- State: Virginia

The Corrotoman River, located in Lancaster County, Virginia, is a tributary of the Rappahannock River. Along with its sister waterways, the Corrotoman River has important cultural and historical significance in the region due to the pre-colonization of indigenous communities, notably the Powhatan peoples. The Corrotoman River was a former site of seed oysters, and was closed down for a certain disease infecting the oyster population.

== Description ==
=== Main Body ===
The mouth of the Corrotoman River is between Towle Point and Orchard Point. Whitehouse Creek, as well as Ewells Prong and Millenbeck Prong, are located on the western side of the river. Farther north and inland, Corrotoman Point sits on the eastern shore of the river, and Ball Point is located on the western shore of the river. The river narrows significantly at this point.

On the western side of the river, after Ball Point, Yankee Point marks the beginning of Myers Creek. Myers Creek is home to the river’s only marina, the Yankee Point Marina. North of Yankee Point is Bar Point, where the Western Branch begins.

On the eastern side of the river, after Corrotoman Point, are Taylor Creek and Moran Creek. To the north is Moran Wharf, which signifies the start of the Eastern Branch.

=== Western Branch ===
The Western Branch starts between Bar Point and West Point, which point northwest. The Merry Point cable ferry is located near the start of the branch that runs between Ottoman Wharf and Merry Point. Heading up the branch, the creeks are encountered in the following order: John Creek, Lowrey Creek, Senior Creek, and Davis Creek. From there, the branch splits into two forks. The eastern fork ends at Bellwood Swamp, approximately one mile west of Lancaster Courthouse, while the western fork, Little Branch, ends at Griffins Landing.

=== Eastern Branch ===
The Eastern Branch starts between West Point and Moran Wharf, and points in a northeast direction. The branch splits off into Camps Prong and Norris Prong, which lead to Camps Millpond and Norris Pond respectively.

== See also ==
- List of rivers of Virginia
- Powhatan
- Pocahontas
- Algonquian peoples
