= Morattico, Virginia =

Unincorporated community in Virginia, United States

- Unincorporated town
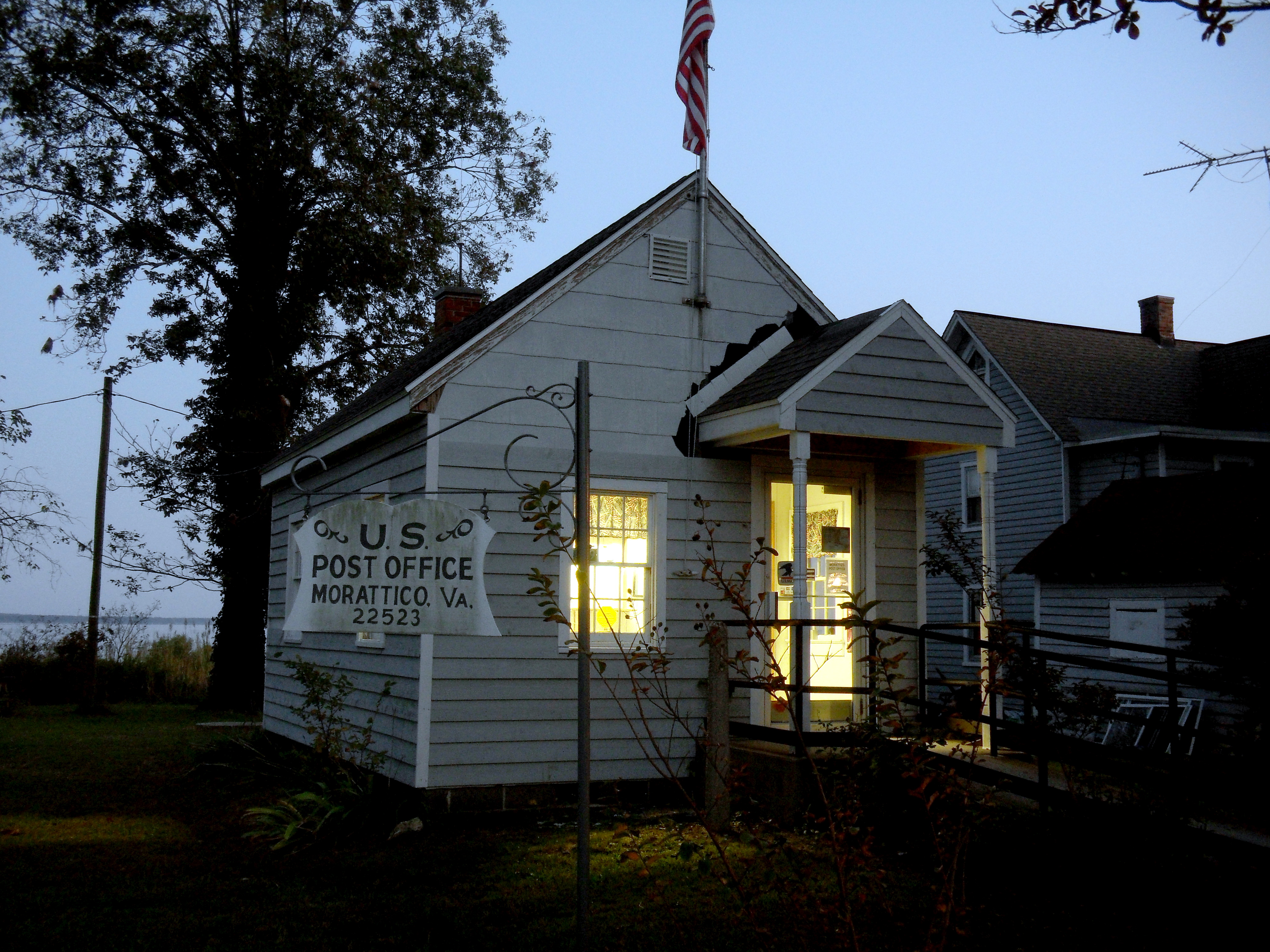
- Post office in the historic district

- Location in Virginia Location in the United States
- Coordinates: 37°47′21″N 76°37′45″W
- Country: United States
- State: Virginia
- County: Lancaster
- Time zone: UTC−5 (Eastern (EST))
  - Summer (DST): UTC−4 (EDT)
- ZIP code: 22523

Morattico is an unincorporated former post office town along the Rappahannock River in Lancaster County, Virginia, United States. It sits across Mulberry Creek from Belle Isle State Park. "Morattico" is an anglicized version of "Moraughtacund", the name of a Native American tribe whose primary village may have been on or near this site.

== History ==
The Moraughtacunds and their site were discovered by Captain John Smith in 1608. He would mediate a feud between the Moraughtacunds and their neighbors, the Rappahannock tribe. The Moraughtacund tribe moved further west by 1650.

By the end of the 17th century, Joseph Ball I took possession of the site, and began building Morattico Plantation to cultivate tobacco. In 1706, he deeded the property to his son, Joseph Ball II. However, his nephew, Joseph Chinn, would manage the site due to Joseph Ball II primarily residing in England. After Joseph Ball II died in 1760, the plantation's ownership was transferred to his daughter, Frances Ravenscroft Ball Downman, and her husband, Rawleigh Downman II.

Rawleigh Downman II, who had served on the county's Committee of Safety during the Revolutionary War, by the end of the century, bought Belle Isle plantation nearby, and family members likewise continued to own it for a century, operating it using enslaved labor until the American Civil War.

Their son, Joseph Ball Downman, would inherit the site after Rawleigh and Frances passed away in 1781 and 1782 respectively. In 1799, James W.P Downman, the son of Joseph Ball Downman, would inherit the plantation after his father's death. He would die at a young age in 1834, leaving neither an heir nor a will. In 1835, his surviving siblings, George William Downman and Sarah Downman, successfully petitioned to have Morattico Plantation to be divided into eight equal parts. From 1835 to 1845, his surviving siblings purchased most of the plantation.

George William Downman would die at an unknown date, leaving his share to Sarah Downman, his sister. Littleton Downman Mitchell, Sarah's nephew, would inherit the plantation after her death in 1849. Around 1850, the original dwelling was dismantled by Downman himself. From 1864 to 1868, Downman lost ownership of the site, and his creditors would purchase the plantation.

During the 20th century, the site transitioned into a small village that specialized in the fishing industry, especially oystering and crabbing. Decades later, the 1933 Chesapeake–Potomac hurricane would reportedly cover the first floor of all buildings in the Morattico area except for the Morattico Plantation itself. L.C Thrift would then dismantle the plantation in 1935, using some materials from it to construct a two-story farmhouse.

From the 1980s to the early 2000s, bigger residences would be erected to accommodate weekend-residence; in present day, the commercial fishing industry would cease to exist as a viable economic pursuit.

The Village of Morattico Historic District was listed on the National Register of Historic Places in 2011.

== Landmarks ==
=== Historical buildings ===
The Morattico Waterfront Museum chronicles the history of Morattico and is located on the site of the original Morattico Wharf that operated from 1889 to 1933.

The Norwood Church was established in 1893 with the present church being built in 1897.

=== Bodies of water ===
Mulberry Creek is a 2 1/2-mile long tidal stream that enters the Rappahannock river around 26 miles above the river's mouth.

Morattico Creek is a body of water located in the town. Its name is thought to have originated from the second Morattico Indian Reservation.

Frog Pond is a swampy area located westside of Mulberry Creek Road. A well that provided water to many residents from the 18th century to the mid-20th century was located in its northwestern boundary.

=== Other ===
Carpenter's Landing is an area used as a boat landing from both the early 19th century and early 20th century. It is located between the mouth of Mulberry Creek and the mouth of Raccoon Cove.

Raccoon Cove is a cove located on the north bank of Mulberry Creek.
