= Lancaster County, Virginia =

County in Virginia, United States

- County
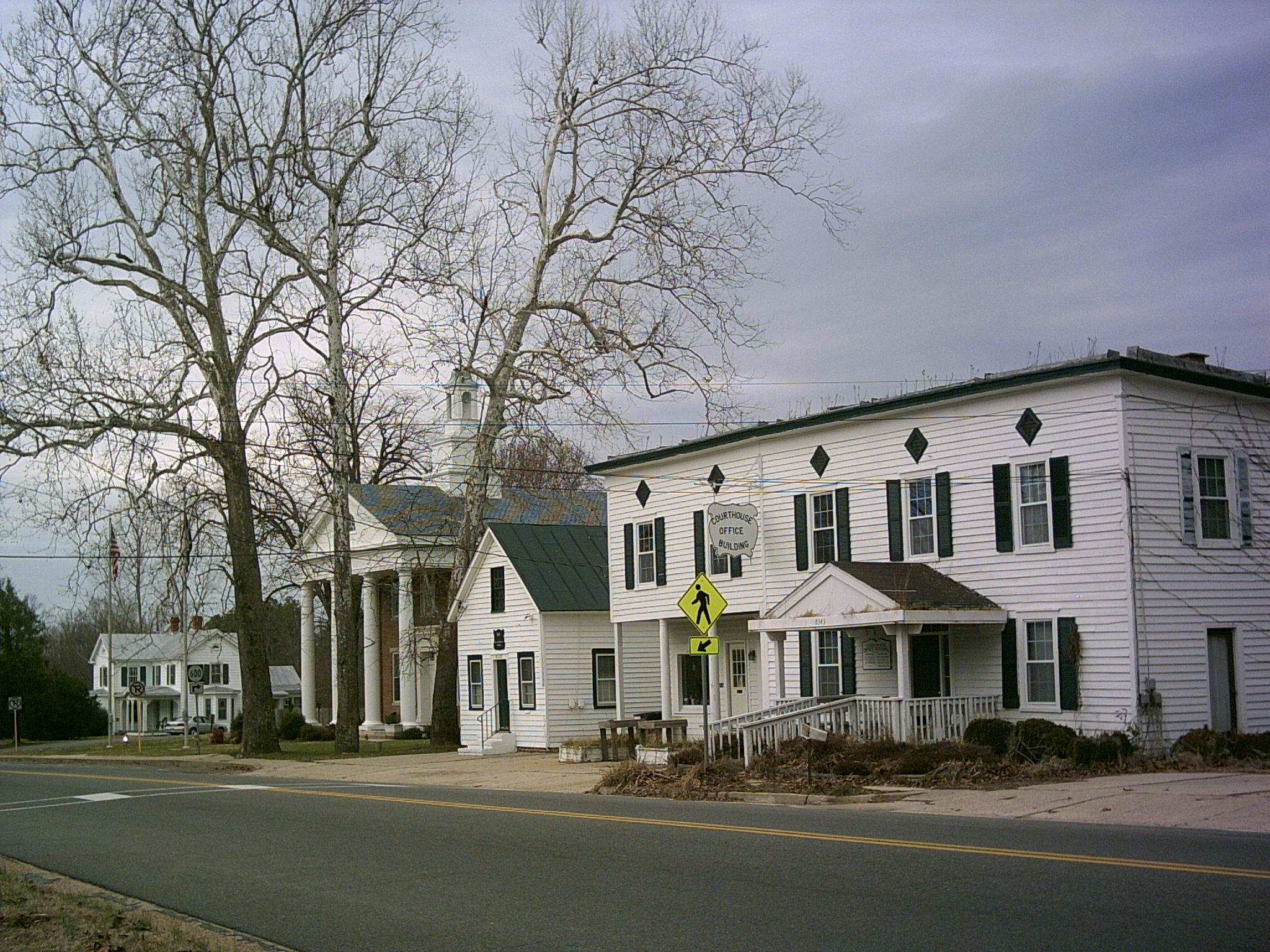
- Central Lancaster, the county seat, with the county courthouse visible

- Location within the U.S. state of Virginia
- Coordinates: 37°43′N 76°25′W
- Country: United States
- State: Virginia
- Founded: 1651
- Seat: Lancaster
- Largest town: Kilmarnock

Area
  - Total: 231 sq mi (600 km^{2})
  - Land: 133 sq mi (340 km^{2})
  - Water: 98 sq mi (250 km^{2}) 42.4%

Population (2020)
  - Total: 10,919
  - Estimate (2025): 10,995 ▲
  - Density: 82.1/sq mi (31.7/km^{2})
- Time zone: UTC−5 (Eastern)
  - Summer (DST): UTC−4 (EDT)
- Congressional district: 1st
- Website: www.lancova.com

Lancaster County is a county located on the Northern Neck in the Commonwealth of Virginia. As of the 2020 census, the population sits at 10,919. Its county seat is Lancaster.

Located on the Northern Neck near the mouth of the Rappahannock River, Lancaster County is part of the Northern Neck George Washington Birthplace wine-growing region recognized by the United States as an American Viticultural Area. The largest town in Lancaster County is Kilmarnock, Virginia. The county's area code is 804.

== History ==
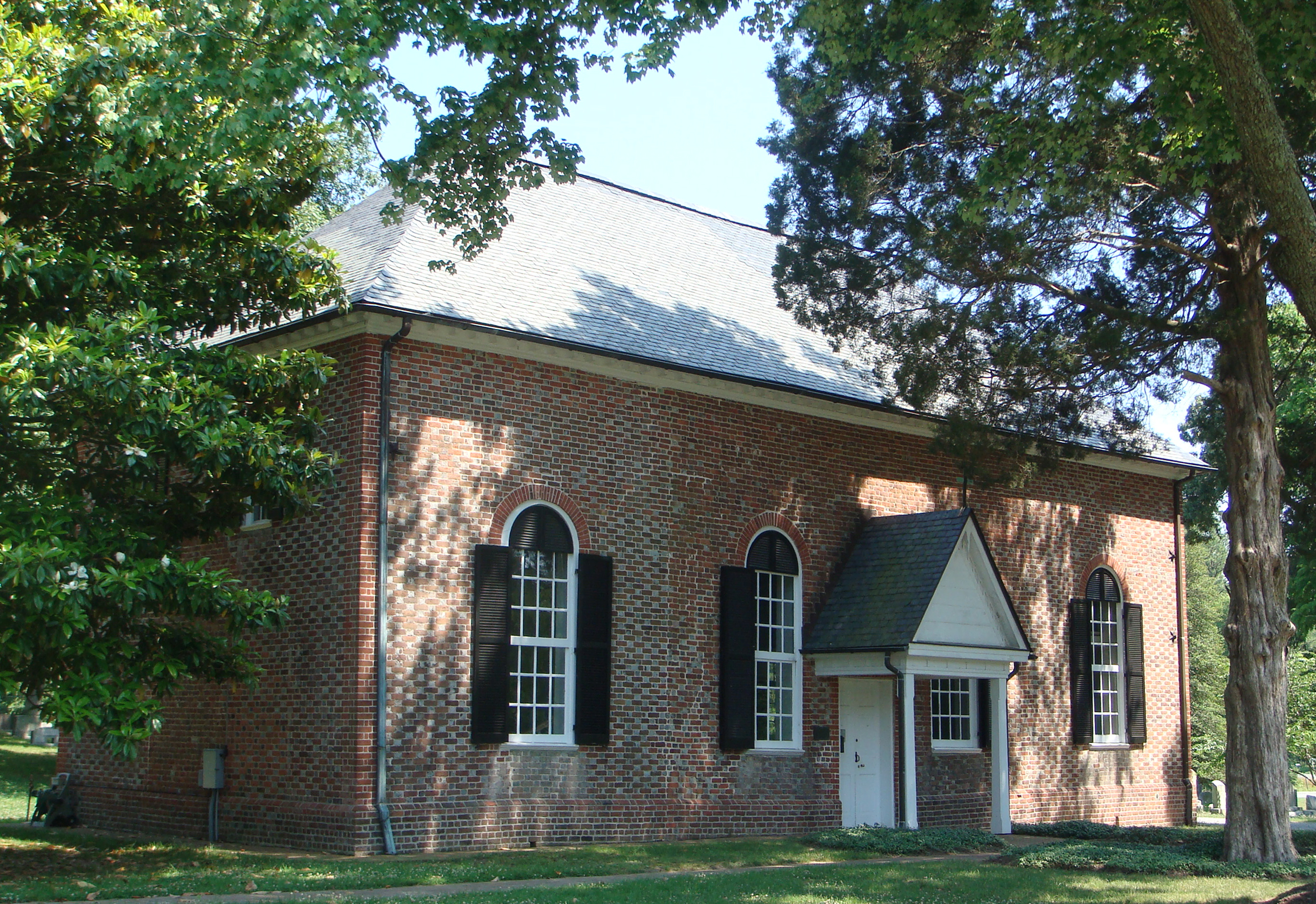
The historic church of St. Mary's, Whitechapel, in Lancaster County, St. Mary's parish was the birthplace of Mary Ball Washington, mother of George Washington

Lancaster County was established in 1651 from Northumberland and York counties, and large land patents (subject to terms including clearing and settlement) were issued that year. It was home to Robert King Carter in the 18th century, and remaining buildings from that time include Christ Church and St. Mary's, Whitechapel. Other historic attractions open to the public include the Lancaster Courthouse Historic District including the Mary Ball Washington Museum and Library, Belle Isle State Park, and the Village of Morattico Historic District.

== Geography ==
According to the U.S. Census Bureau, the county has a total area of 231 square miles (600 km^{2}), of which 133 square miles (340 km^{2}) is land and 98 square miles (250 km^{2}) (42.4%) is water.

=== Adjacent counties ===
- Richmond County – northwest
- Northumberland County – north
- Middlesex County – south and southwest

=== Major highways ===
- SR 3
- SR 200
- SR 201
- SR 222
- SR 354

== Demographics ==
Historical population
| Census | Pop. | Note | %± |
|---|---|---|---|
| 1790 | 5,638 | | — |
| 1800 | 5,375 | | −4.7% |
| 1810 | 5,592 | | 4.0% |
| 1820 | 5,517 | | −1.3% |
| 1830 | 4,801 | | −13.0% |
| 1840 | 4,628 | | −3.6% |
| 1850 | 4,708 | | 1.7% |
| 1860 | 5,151 | | 9.4% |
| 1870 | 5,355 | | 4.0% |
| 1880 | 6,160 | | 15.0% |
| 1890 | 7,191 | | 16.7% |
| 1900 | 8,949 | | 24.4% |
| 1910 | 9,752 | | 9.0% |
| 1920 | 9,757 | | 0.1% |
| 1930 | 8,896 | | −8.8% |
| 1940 | 8,786 | | −1.2% |
| 1950 | 8,640 | | −1.7% |
| 1960 | 9,174 | | 6.2% |
| 1970 | 9,126 | | −0.5% |
| 1980 | 10,129 | | 11.0% |
| 1990 | 10,896 | | 7.6% |
| 2000 | 11,567 | | 6.2% |
| 2010 | 11,391 | | −1.5% |
| 2020 | 10,919 | | −4.1% |
| 2025 (est.) | 10,995 | ▲ | 0.7% |
U.S. Decennial Census; 1790–1960 1900–1990; 1990–2000 2010 2020

=== Racial and ethnic composition ===
Lancaster County, Virginia – Racial and ethnic composition Note: the US Census treats Hispanic/Latino as an ethnic category. This table excludes Latinos from the racial categories and assigns them to a separate category. Hispanics/Latinos may be of any race.
| Race / Ethnicity (NH = Non-Hispanic) | Pop 1980 | Pop 1990 | Pop 2000 | Pop 2010 | Pop 2020 | % 1980 | % 1990 | % 2000 | % 2010 | % 2020 |
|---|---|---|---|---|---|---|---|---|---|---|
| White alone (NH) | 6,727 | 7,554 | 8,055 | 7,925 | 7,441 | 66.41% | 69.33% | 69.64% | 69.57% | 68.15% |
| Black or African American alone (NH) | 3,320 | 3,248 | 3,324 | 3,166 | 2,946 | 32.78% | 29.81% | 28.74% | 27.79% | 26.98% |
| Native American or Alaska Native alone (NH) | 9 | 6 | 16 | 16 | 14 | 0.09% | 0.06% | 0.14% | 0.14% | 0.13% |
| Asian alone (NH) | 14 | 12 | 37 | 65 | 77 | 0.14% | 0.11% | 0.32% | 0.57% | 0.71% |
| Native Hawaiian or Pacific Islander alone (NH) | x | x | 7 | 0 | 1 | x | x | 0.06% | 0.00% | 0.01% |
| Other race alone (NH) | 6 | 1 | 3 | 5 | 39 | 0.06% | 0.01% | 0.03% | 0.04% | 0.36% |
| Mixed race or Multiracial (NH) | x | x | 54 | 96 | 276 | x | x | 0.47% | 0.84% | 2.53% |
| Hispanic or Latino (any race) | 53 | 75 | 71 | 118 | 125 | 0.52% | 0.69% | 0.61% | 1.04% | 1.14% |
| Total | 10,129 | 10,896 | 11,567 | 11,391 | 10,919 | 100.00% | 100.00% | 100.00% | 100.00% | 100.00% |

=== 2020 census ===
As of the 2020 census, the county had a population of 10,919. The median age was 59.2 years. 14.0% of residents were under the age of 18 and 38.4% of residents were 65 years of age or older. For every 100 females there were 87.4 males, and for every 100 females age 18 and over there were 85.1 males age 18 and over.

The racial makeup of the county was 68.4% White, 27.0% Black or African American, 0.2% American Indian and Alaska Native, 0.7% Asian, 0.0% Native Hawaiian and Pacific Islander, 0.5% from some other race, and 3.1% from two or more races. Hispanic or Latino residents of any race comprised 1.1% of the population.

0.0% of residents lived in urban areas, while 100.0% lived in rural areas.

There were 5,211 households in the county, of which 16.7% had children under the age of 18 living with them and 31.4% had a female householder with no spouse or partner present. About 35.6% of all households were made up of individuals and 22.3% had someone living alone who was 65 years of age or older.

There were 7,448 housing units, of which 30.0% were vacant. Among occupied housing units, 76.9% were owner-occupied and 23.1% were renter-occupied. The homeowner vacancy rate was 2.9% and the rental vacancy rate was 16.6%.

=== 2000 Census ===
As of the census of 2000, there were 11,567 people, 5,004 households, and 3,412 families residing in the county. The population density was 87 people per square mile (34 people/km^{2}). There were 6,498 housing units at an average density of 49 units per square mile (19 units/km^{2}). The racial makeup of the county was 69.95% White, 28.88% Black or African American, 0.14% Native American, 0.34% Asian, 0.06% Pacific Islander, 0.10% from other races, and 0.54% from two or more races. 0.61% of the population were Hispanic or Latino of any race.

There were 5,004 households, out of which 21.20% had children under the age of 18 living with them, 54.70% were married couples living together, 11.10% had a female householder with no husband present, and 31.80% were non-families. 28.70% of all households were made up of individuals, and 16.80% had someone living alone who was 65 years of age or older. The average household size was 2.23 and the average family size was 2.71.

In the county, the population was spread out, with 19.00% under the age of 18, 5.00% from 18 to 24, 19.60% from 25 to 44, 28.00% from 45 to 64, and 28.50% who were 65 years of age or older. The median age was 50 years. For every 100 females there were 86.80 males. For every 100 females age 18 and over, there were 81.50 males.

Type of workers for this country are: Private wage or salary (72%); Government (15%); and Self-employed (12%). The median income for a household in the county was $33,239, and the median income for a family was $42,957. Males had a median income of $30,592 versus $23,039 for females. The per capita income for the county was $24,663. Approximately 9.90% of families and 12.50% of the population were below the poverty line, including 18.00% of those under age 18 and 11.20% of those age 65 or over.

== Economy ==
The economy in Lancaster County is primarily composed of services industries with education, health care, social service administration, scientific, professional, administrative, and retail work making up about 56% of the workforce. Secondarily, trades such as construction, manufacturing, transportation, warehousing, and utilities make up about 21% of the workforce.

Most businesses in the county are small businesses with 64% of businesses employing 0 to 4 employees. 81% of employers in the county employ fewer than 10 employees. Larger employers (50+ employees) make up just 3% of employers, with the largest among those including health care providers such as the Bon Secours Health System (Rappahannock General Hospital) and Rappahannock Westminster Canterbury—local governments such as the Lancaster County School Board and Lancaster County government—and retail including Walmart.

Lancaster County overall had an unemployment rate of about 2.9%, similar to Virginia's of about 2.5% in September 2023, however, the county's unemployment rate tends to spike in off-season months from January through April due to seasonal employment.

== Government ==
Lancaster County is governed by a five-member board of supervisors. The board meets in the Lancaster County Administration Building at 7 p.m. on the last Thursday of every month. The Administration building is located at 8311 Mary Ball Road in Lancaster, Virginia.

=== Board of Supervisors ===
- District 1: Craig H. Giese (R)
- District 2: Ernest W. Palin Jr., Chair (I)
- District 3: Jason D. Bellows, Vice Chair (I)
- District 4: William R. Lee (I)
- District 5: William C. Smith (I)

=== Constitutional officers ===
- Clerk of the Circuit Court: Diane H. Mumford (I)
- Commissioner of the Revenue: Elizabeth Cornwell
- Commonwealth Attorney: Anthony Spencer (R)
- Sheriff: Patrick McCranie (R)
- Treasurer: Bonnie J. Dickson

Lancaster is represented by Republican Richard Stuart in the Virginia Senate, Republican Hillary Pugh Kent in the Virginia House of Delegates, and Republican Robert J. "Rob" Wittman in the U.S. House of Representatives.

United States presidential election results for Lancaster County, Virginia
| Year | Republican | | Democratic | | Third party(ies) | |
| Year | No. | % | No. | % | No. | % |
|---|---|---|---|---|---|---|
| 1912 | 82 | 14.04% | 479 | 82.02% | 23 | 3.94% |
| 1916 | 58 | 11.11% | 461 | 88.31% | 3 | 0.57% |
| 1920 | 138 | 25.27% | 404 | 73.99% | 4 | 0.73% |
| 1924 | 90 | 13.47% | 564 | 84.43% | 14 | 2.10% |
| 1928 | 520 | 62.28% | 315 | 37.72% | 0 | 0.00% |
| 1932 | 272 | 29.34% | 639 | 68.93% | 16 | 1.73% |
| 1936 | 322 | 31.76% | 689 | 67.95% | 3 | 0.30% |
| 1940 | 317 | 30.60% | 711 | 68.63% | 8 | 0.77% |
| 1944 | 390 | 36.76% | 666 | 62.77% | 5 | 0.47% |
| 1948 | 459 | 39.10% | 560 | 47.70% | 155 | 13.20% |
| 1952 | 1,228 | 61.49% | 753 | 37.71% | 16 | 0.80% |
| 1956 | 1,380 | 70.66% | 373 | 19.10% | 200 | 10.24% |
| 1960 | 1,340 | 59.56% | 895 | 39.78% | 15 | 0.67% |
| 1964 | 1,663 | 57.13% | 1,245 | 42.77% | 3 | 0.10% |
| 1968 | 1,640 | 44.93% | 1,134 | 31.07% | 876 | 24.00% |
| 1972 | 2,683 | 71.64% | 1,009 | 26.94% | 53 | 1.42% |
| 1976 | 2,381 | 58.44% | 1,581 | 38.81% | 112 | 2.75% |
| 1980 | 2,780 | 61.01% | 1,567 | 34.39% | 210 | 4.61% |
| 1984 | 3,416 | 67.72% | 1,559 | 30.91% | 69 | 1.37% |
| 1988 | 3,380 | 67.02% | 1,551 | 30.76% | 112 | 2.22% |
| 1992 | 2,841 | 51.39% | 1,812 | 32.78% | 875 | 15.83% |
| 1996 | 2,709 | 55.36% | 1,844 | 37.69% | 340 | 6.95% |
| 2000 | 3,411 | 62.53% | 1,937 | 35.51% | 107 | 1.96% |
| 2004 | 3,724 | 59.78% | 2,477 | 39.76% | 29 | 0.47% |
| 2008 | 3,647 | 52.57% | 3,235 | 46.63% | 56 | 0.81% |
| 2012 | 3,753 | 53.91% | 3,149 | 45.24% | 59 | 0.85% |
| 2016 | 3,523 | 53.02% | 2,869 | 43.18% | 253 | 3.81% |
| 2020 | 3,697 | 51.69% | 3,368 | 47.09% | 87 | 1.22% |
| 2024 | 3,866 | 52.86% | 3,355 | 45.88% | 92 | 1.26% |

== Communities ==
=== Towns ===
- Irvington
- Kilmarnock - partly in Northumberland County
- White Stone

=== Census-designated places ===
- Lancaster
- Weems

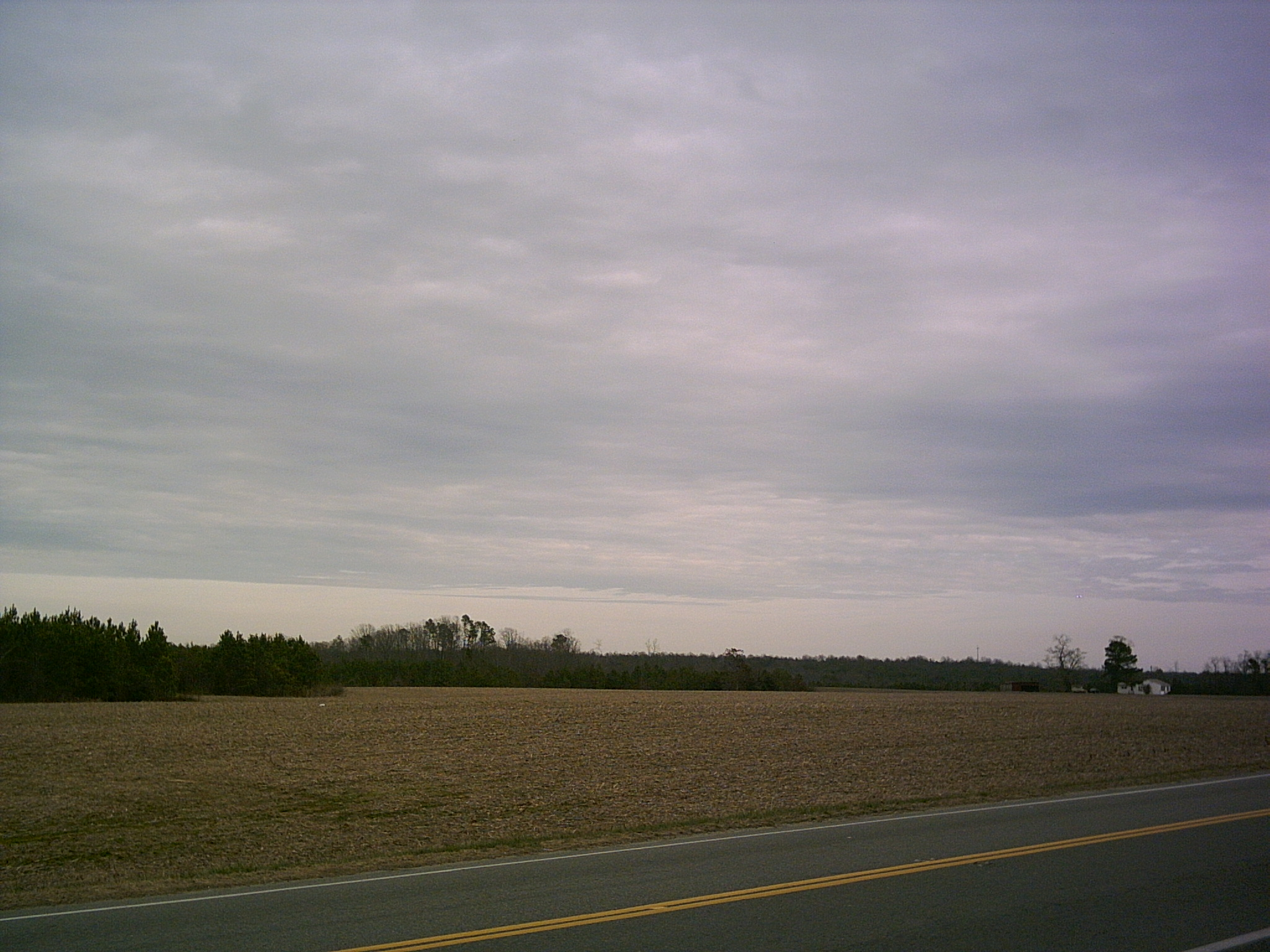
Outskirts of Lively, in Lancaster County

=== Other unincorporated communities ===
- Christ Church
- Litwalton
- Lively
- Merry Point
- Mollusk
- Morattico
- Ottoman

== Points of interest ==
Lancaster County is home to the historic church of St. Mary's, Whitechapel, founded in 1669. Mary Ball Washington, mother of George Washington, was born in the parish of St. Mary's. Rappahannock General Hospital is in Kilmarnock, it is the only hospital on the Northern Neck. Other attractions are:

- Irvington Steamboat Museum
- Windmill Point Beach
- Belle Isle State Park
- Chilton Woods State Forest
- Ampro Shipyard
- Historic Christ Church

== See also ==
- National Register of Historic Places listings in Lancaster County, Virginia
