= Virginia State Route 3 =

State highway in central Virginia, US

State Route 3

Route information
- Maintained by VDOT
- Length: 150.55 mi (242.29 km)
- Existed: July 1, 1933–present
- Tourist routes: Virginia Byway

Major junctions
- West end: US 15 Bus. / US 522 in Culpeper
- I-95 / US 17 in Fredericksburg; US 1 in Fredericksburg; US 301 in Office Hall; US 360 / SR 3 Bus. in Warsaw
- South end: US 17 Bus. / SR 14 in Gloucester

Location
- Country: United States
- State: Virginia

Highway system
- Virginia Routes; Interstate; US; Primary; Secondary; Byways; History; HOT lanes
← SR 2	→ SR 4

Virginia State Route 3 is a primary state highway in the U.S. state of Virginia that extends from the town of Culpeper south and eastwardly to Gloucester in Virginia's Middle Peninsula region. For many years, a portion was named "Historyland Highway".

== Route description ==
=== Gloucester to Kilmarnock ===
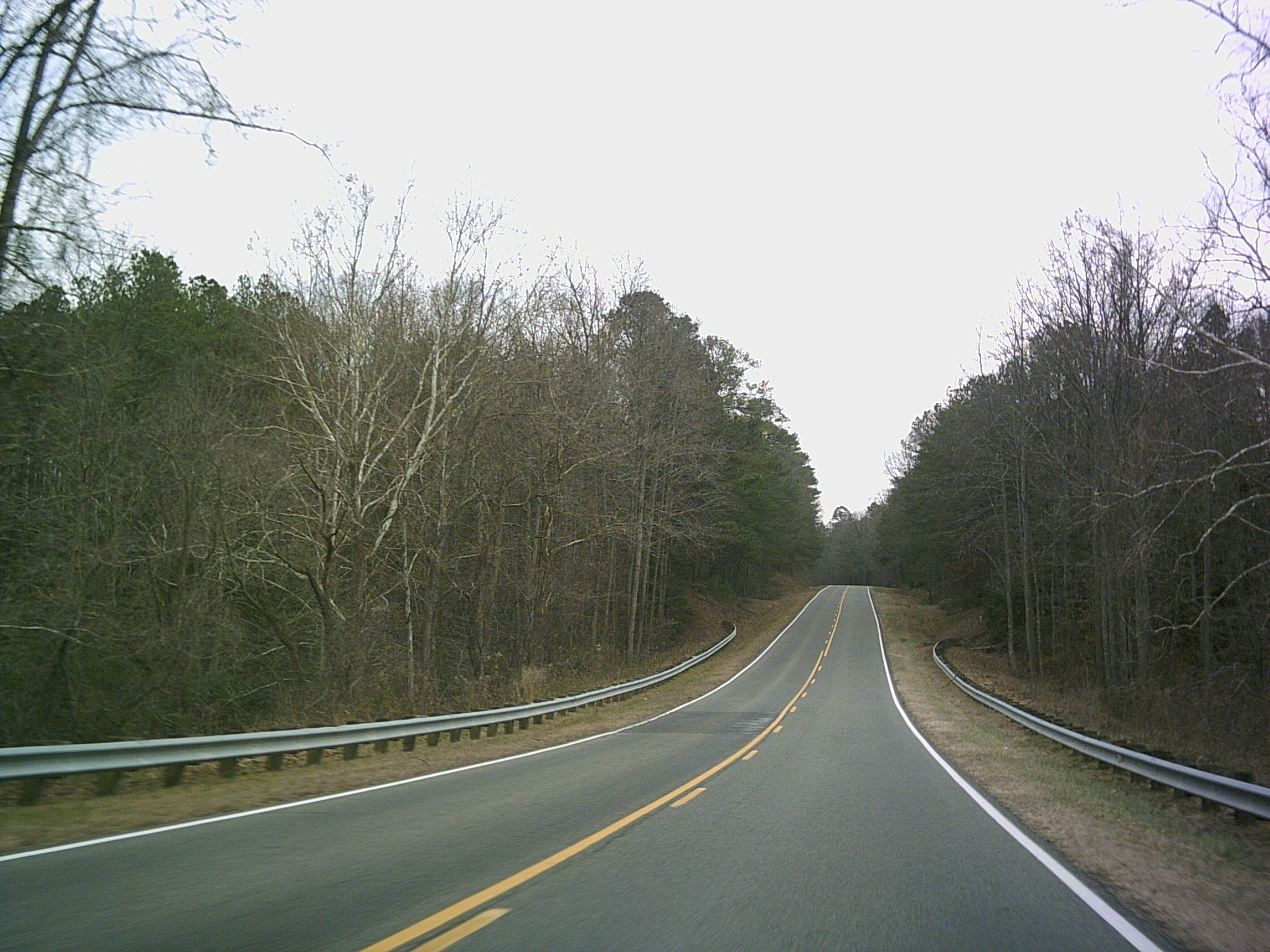
SR 3 in rural Lancaster County

SR 3 begins in the community of Gloucester Courthouse, the unincorporated county seat of Gloucester County, on Virginia's Middle Peninsula, at a three-way junction with U.S. Route 17 Business and SR 14. SR 14 continues west from the junction along northbound US 17 Business through the central business district of Gloucester Courthouse. SR 3 follows SR 14 east in a wrong-way concurrency and immediately heads into rural agricultural and residential surroundings as a four-lane divided highway, called the John Clayton Memorial Highway heading northeast. The two state highways run concurrent until they cross into Mathews County, and reach the unincorporated village of James Store, where SR 14 continues east towards the community of Mathews, the unincorporated county seat of Mathews County along an undivided alignment, while westbound SR 3 turns north onto a two-lane undivided highway, known as Windsor Road. Immediately past the split with SR 14, the state highway passes to the west of Fort Nonsense, a state historical park, before it continues north through wooded areas with some farm fields, houses, and churches at the clearings. SR 3 meets SR 198 in the hamlet of Soles, where it turns east onto another wrong-way concurrency and two-lane alignment with eastbound SR 198; SR 198 continues west from SR 3 towards its intersection with US 17. The state highway follows SR 198 east along Buckley Hall Road, passing through another mix of woodland and farmland, to another three-way intersection where the two routes split. SR 198 continues east toward Mathews, while SR 3 turns north onto another undivided alignment that is called Twiggs Ferry Road, at the intersection. The state highway heads north through the unincorporated village of Dixie, before crossing the Piankatank River and leaving Mathews County.

Upon crossing the Piankatank River, SR 3 enters Middlesex County in an area of residences with large lots, as it continues to its first junction with SR 33, which heads east from the junction toward the peninsula community of Deltaville. SR 3 turns left on westbound SR 33 to head through the unincorporated village of Hartfield, along a two-lane undivided highway known as the General Puller Highway. The two state highway continue northwest through forested and agricultural surroundings, before expanding again, to a four-lane divided highway. Immediately after the highways widen, SR 3 and SR 33 split, with SR 33 continuing west along the divided highway toward Saluda, the unincorporated county seat of Middlesex County, and Richmond, the capital of the Commonwealth of Virginia, while SR 3 narrows as it turns northeast onto a two-lane undivided highway called Greys Point Road. The state highway continues through agricultural areas in the unincorporated village of Topping, before it passes to the southeast of Hummel Field, a local airport that serves Saluda. SR 3 comes into Lancaster County, on its crossing of the Rappahannock River on the Robert O. Norris Bridge, a truss bridge that has a 14-foot vertical clearance. Past the river, the state highway enters the state's Northern Neck peninsula, where its name changes to Mary Ball Road, and comes into the town of White Stone on Rappahannock Drive, where it meets the southern terminus of SR 200. Past White Stone, SR 3 resumes its Mary Ball Road name, and widens to a four-lane divided highway, before becoming undivided again when it enters the town of Kilmarnock, becoming Main Street. Within Kilmarnock, thru trucks are prohibited and the state highway insects SR 200 again, forming a brief concurrency with that route through town. SR 200 heads south from SR 3 back toward the town of Irvington, while it heads north from SR 3 towards the community of Reedville in neighboring Northumberland County, via a connection with US 360.

=== Kilmarnock to Fredericksburg ===
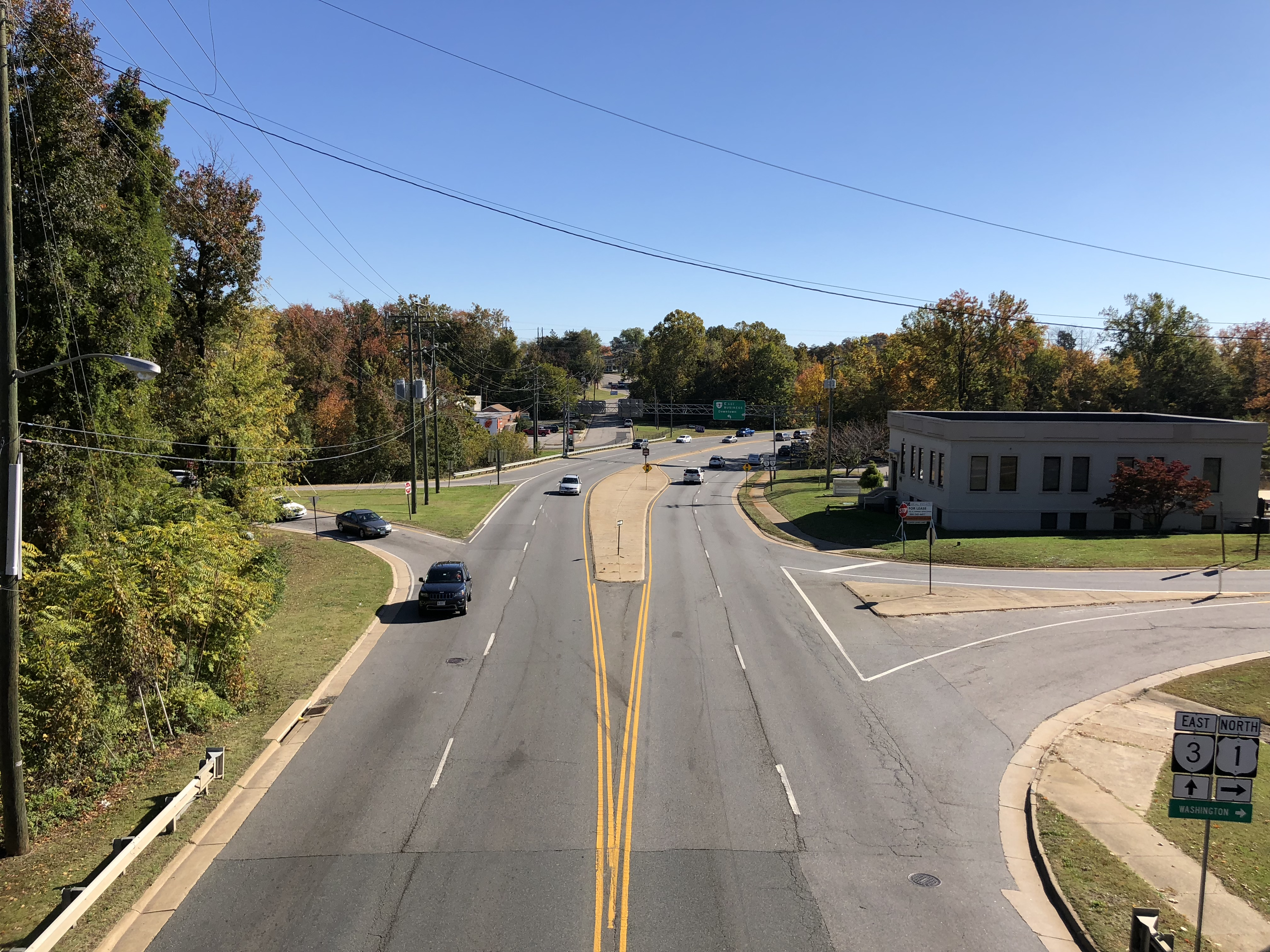
SR 3 eastbound viewed from US 1 in Fredericksburg

SR 3 heads north through commercial areas, passing northeast of the Rappahannock Community College campus in the Kilmarnock Center strip mall. The state highway leaves Kilmarnock and expands to a four-lane divided highway as Mary Ball Road, that heads back into wooded areas. A short distance later, SR 3 narrows to a two-lane undivided highway surrounded by additional farm fields, as it passes through the hamlets of Brook Vale and Milestone, before passing through a residential strip in the unincorporated village of Lancaster, the county seat of Lancaster County. The state highway west through a forested area, before turning north-northwest into open farm fields, where it reaches the unincorporated village of Lively. Here, SR 3 intersects SR 201, in which southbound SR 201 provides access to Belle Isle State Park. The state highway leaves Lively and runs northwest through more rural areas, before it intersects another outlet to Belle Isle State Park, SR 354. Past SR 354, SR 3 enters Richmond County as the History Land Highway, passes through the residential hamlet of Robley, before it passes to the southwest of the center of the unincorporated village of Farnham, in an agricultural area. From this point, the state highway runs West-Northwest through a residential strip consisting of farmhouses, as well as open farm fields between Farnham and the hamlet of Emmerton. Northwest of Emmerton, SR 3 widens again into a divided highway with four lanes, with a wide, grassy median, that crosses over Totuskey Creek on the Richmond County Veterans Memorial Bridge. From Totuskey Creek, development around the state highway increases again as it curves north into the town of Warsaw, the county seat of Richmond County. Within Warsaw, SR 3 comes to an intersection with US 360 and the southern terminus of SR 3 Business, while it bypasses the center of town to the east; westbound US 360/SR 3 Business provides access to the center of Warsaw as well as Richmond.

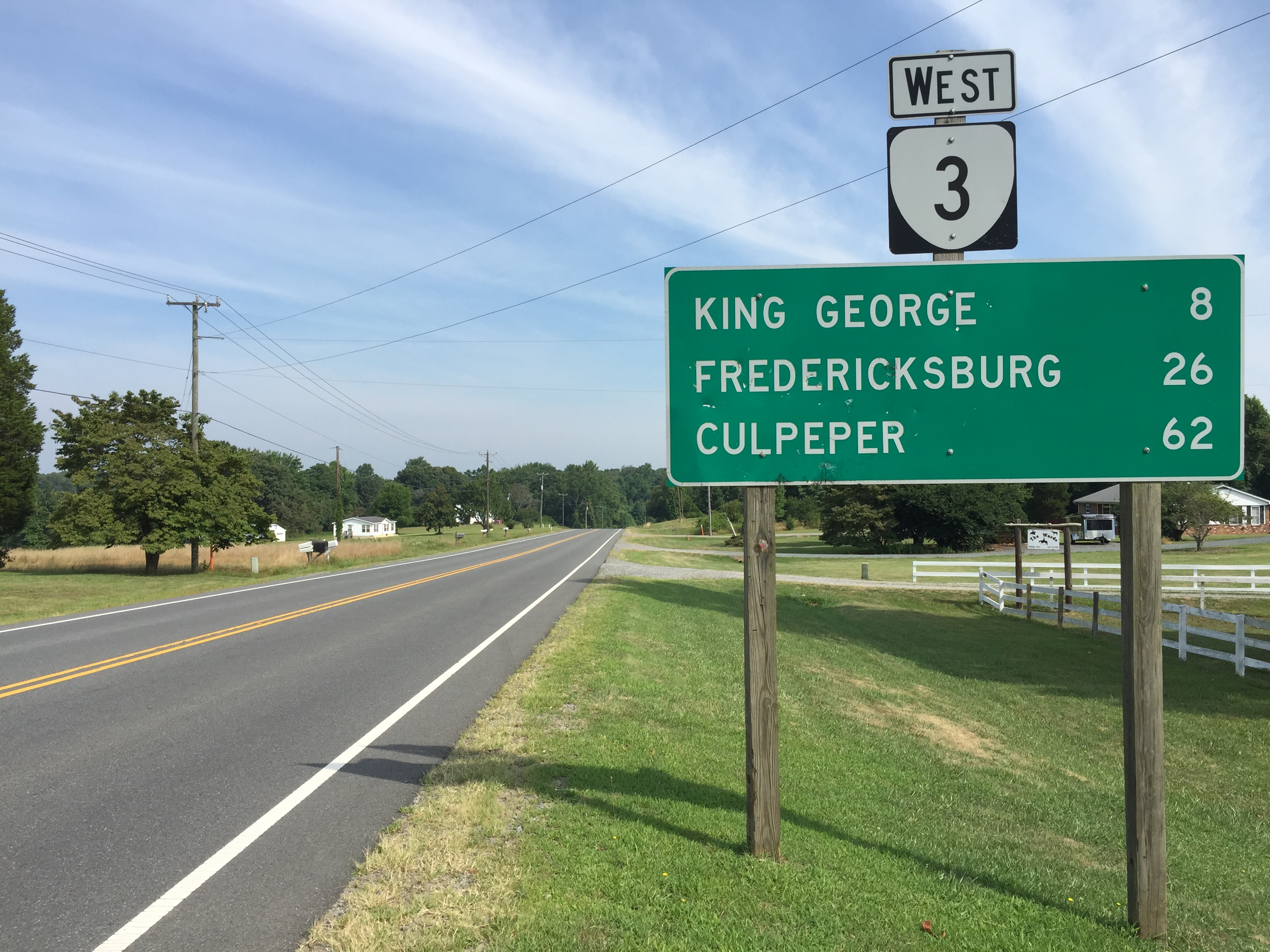
SR 3 westbound in King George County

The state highway continues from US 360 along four-lane bypass until SR 3 Business loops back to road, north of the center of Warsaw, where it narrows back two lanes and becomes undivided again. SR 3 intersects the western end of SR 203, which leads east toward the unincorporated town of Kinsale, in the village of Lyells, before it leaves Richmond County; SR 203 also provides access to the villages of Hague and Sandy Point, via connections with secondary state highways SR 616 and SR 604, respectively. Past Lyells, the state highway comes into Westmoreland County where its name changes to King's Highway, through areas of rural residences, before it reaches the agricultural hamlet of Nomini Grove. At this point, SR 3 heads through wooded areas, where it becomes a four-lane divided highway again that has an intersection with western terminus of SR 202, which leads east to the village of Mount Holly as well as Hague. A short distance later, the state highway reaches commercial surroundings and narrows to an undivided road that retains four lanes, heading west into the town of Montross, the county seat of Westmoreland County. SR 3 narrows to two lanes as it approaches the center of Montross, where it reverse turns and passes east of the Historic Westmoreland County Courthouse, before it leaves town and regains it shoulder. It continues north-northwest through rural forested areas with nearby farms and residences, where it intersects SR 214, the primary access road to Stratford Hall, in the hamlet of Lerty. East of the hamlet of Baynesville, the route also insects SR 347, which leads into Westmoreland State Park, before it turns northwest again through the hamlet of Potomac Mills, prior to coming to an intersection with SR 204, the primary access road to the George Washington Birthplace National Monument in the hamlet of Wakefield Corner. SR 3 turns nearly due west as it reaches the village of Oak Grove, where it intersects the east end of SR 205 that loops away to serve the town of Colonial Beach, as well as providing access to the James Monroe Family Home Site.

Past the eastern junction with SR 205, SR 3 heads back into wooded surroundings and then into open farm fields, where it enters King George County, east of the village of Rollins Fork. From here, the state highway turns northwest and passes through the rural villages of Index and Shiloh, before coming to a four-way intersection with US 301 in the hamlet of Office Hall. From US 301, SR 3 widens to a four-lane divided highway that continues through wooded areas, meeting the western end of SR 205 in the hamlet of Purkins Corner. The state highway curves further westward as it passes through the village of King George, the unincorporated county seat of King George County, where it passes a commercial strip, before narrowing to a two-lane undivided road through the middle of the village. After exiting King George, SR 3 reverts to a four-lane divided highway and reaches an intersection with the western terminus of SR 206, leading northeast to the unincorporated town of Dahlgren, and also provides access to Caledon State Park, in the community of Arnolds Corner. The state highway comes back into rural surroundings in the hamlet of Comorn, and begins to parallel the Rappahannock River, located a short distance to the south of the road. SR 3 continues through the hamlet of Graves Corner, before reaching the village of Sealston, west of which the road enters Stafford County. The state highway continues through a mix of woods and farm fields, passing through the hamlet of Little Falls, prior to heading into residential and commercial areas of suburban development. In this area, SR 3 features a parallel route along a branch of CSX Transportation's RF&P Subdivision rail line on the northeast before drawing away from the tracks at a modified T-intersection. In this intersection, the westbound direction utilizes a flyover ramp to access a four-lane controlled access expressway known as the Blue and Gray Parkway, then immediately crosses the Rappahannock River into the independent city of Fredericksburg; SR 3 Business continues along King's Highway and loops to the north to serve Downtown Fredericksburg.

=== Fredericksburg to Culpeper ===
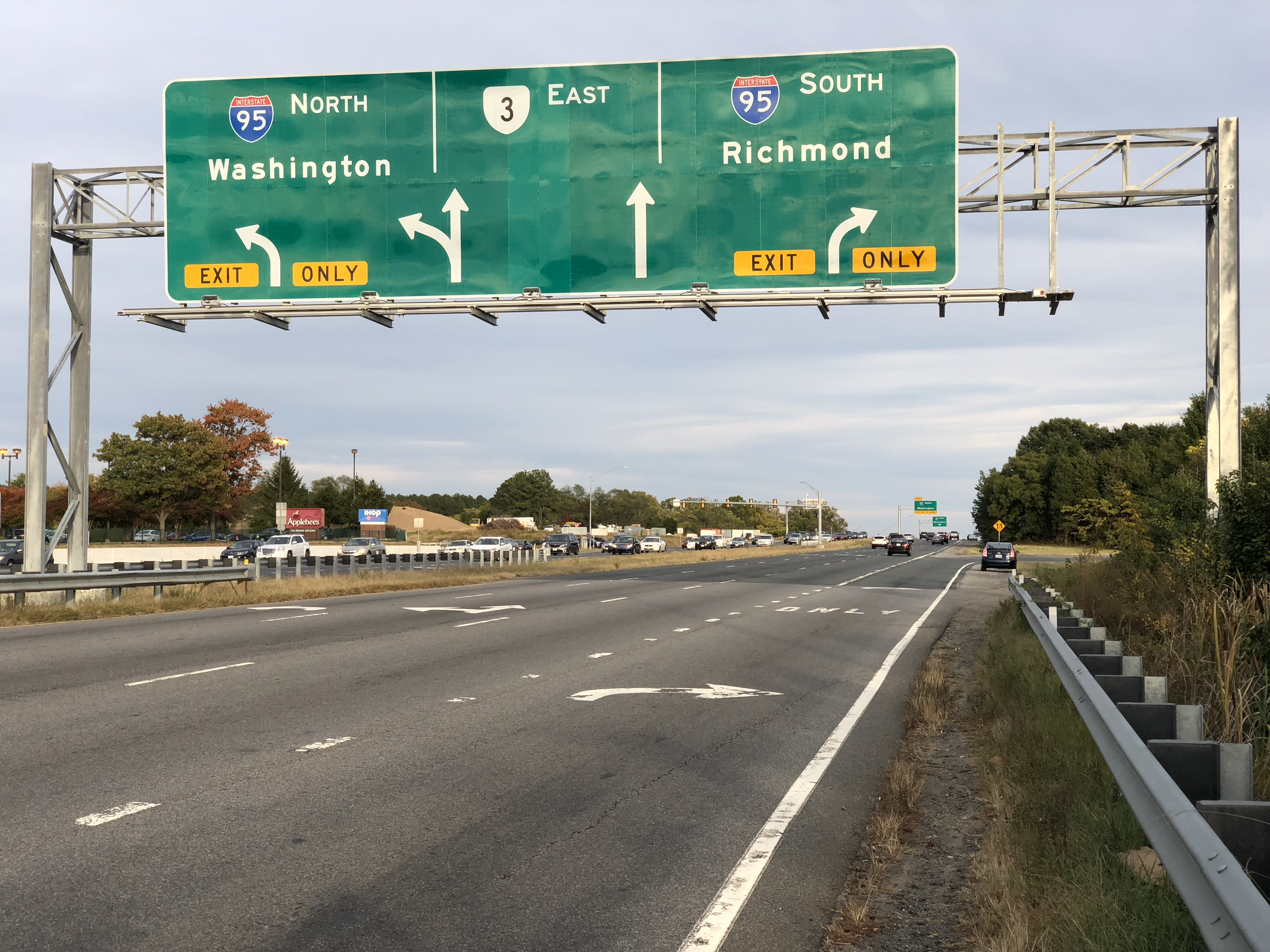
View east along SR 3 at I-95 in Fredericksburg

Upon entering the city of Fredericksburg, SR 3 continues along the Blue and Gray Parkway as it reaches an interchange with US 17 Business south of downtown, that also provides access to SR 2. The state highway then crosses over the RF&P Subdivision line before the expressway ends, at an at-grade intersection with Bellman Road. SR 3 passes to the southwest of the Fredericksburg and Spotsylvania National Military Park and the athletic campus of the University of Mary Washington, prior to picking up the western end of SR 3 Business, providing access to the main campus of the university. From here, SR 3 continues west along William Street, taking over that name from SR 3 Business, and continues to full and almost cloverleaf interchanges with US 1, and Interstate 95 and US 17 respectively, in a commercial area. At the I-95/US 17 junction, the highway's name changes to Plank Road and it expands to six lanes, as it heads through more commercial areas and enters Spotsylvania County. SR 3 narrows back to four lanes, as it reverts to rural surroundings with the terrain becoming more hilly, as it crosses the Atlantic Seaboard Fall Line from the Tidewater Region to the Piedmont Plateau. Within this area, the state highway passes through the hamlet of Chancellorsville, which is home to Chancellorsville Battlefield site, as well as the rural hamlet of Wilderness Corner, before crossing into Orange County just before intersecting the northern terminus of SR 20, in the village of Wilderness; SR 20 provides access to the town of Orange, the county seat of Orange County, and the city of Charlottesville, as well as being the primary access road to James Madison's Montpelier.

Upon entering Orange County, SR 3 becomes Germanna Highway and turns northwest through forested areas, before becoming a commercial strip road serving the planned communities in the suburban development of Lake of the Woods. The state highway heads through more areas of rolling hills before it comes into Culpeper County, at the crossing of the Rapidan River to the northwest of the Germanna site. SR 3 passes to the northwest of the rural village of Lignum before it curves west through the village of Stevensburg. From here, the state highway passes mainly open farm fields, before reaching the eastern end of its concurrency with US 522 in the hamlet of Winfrey. US 522 heads south from Winfrey toward the town of Mineral while northbound US 522 joins westbound SR 3 to reach an interchange with US 15/US 29, a short distance to the west and close to the location of the National Audio-Visual Conservation Center. Past this interchange US 522/SR 3 reduces to a two-lane undivided road, called Fredericksburg Road and follows it into the town of Culpeper, the county seat of Culpeper County. SR 3 reaches its western terminus at US 522's four-way intersection with US 15 Business. US 522 continues west and north from this intersection into Downtown Culpeper, towards the village of Sperryville, in adjacent Rappahannock County, and city of Winchester, as well as providing access to the Culpeper National Cemetery.

== History ==
State Route 7 was defined as part of the original 1918 state highway system from Winchester southeast via Front Royal, and Culpeper to Fredericksburg, and then along the Northern Neck via Warsaw to Reedville. This is now approximated by U.S. Route 522, State Route 3, and U.S. Route 360.

In late 1921, the State Highway Commission looked at possible routes between Winchester and Front Royal, specifically via Middletown to Cedarville and via Boyce, White Post, Stone Bridge, and Rockland to Cedarville, and decided on the direct route via Double Toll Gate.

SR 7 at first ran from Montross via Templeman to Warsaw and then east via Heathsville to Reedville. By late 1922, a branch northwest from Callao via Hague to Templeman was added and assigned the State Route 7-X designation.

In the 1923 renumbering, SR 7 became State Route 37 (and SR 7-X became State Route 371). By the end of that year, SR 37's east end was moved from Reedville to Westland, and the old road between Warsaw and Reedville became part of SR 371.

== Major intersections ==
County	Location	mi	km	Destinations	Notes
Culpeper	Culpeper	0.00	0.00	US 15 Bus. / US 522 north (Orange Road / Germanna Highway) – Winchester, Orange	Western terminus; western end of US 522 concurrency
Culpeper		1.30	2.09	US 15 / US 29 – Washington, Charlottesville	interchange
Culpeper		1.62	2.61	US 522 south (Zachary Taylor Highway) – Mineral, Powhatan	Eastern end of US 522 concurrency
Orange	Wilderness	19.24	30.96	SR 20 south (Constitution Highway) – Orange, Charlottesville, Wilderness Battlefield, James Madison's Montpelier	Northern terminus of SR 20
Spotsylvania	Wilderness Corner	20.20	32.51	SR 613 (Brock Road) – Spotsylvania CH	former SR 210 south
City of Fredericksburg		31.91	51.35	I-95 (US 17) – Washington, Richmond	Exit 130 (I-95)
City of Fredericksburg		33.15	53.35	US 1 – Falmouth, Washington, Massaponax, Richmond	interchange
City of Fredericksburg		33.39	53.74	SR 3 Bus. east (William Street) – Fredericksburg, University of Mary Washington	Western terminus of SR 3 Bus.
City of Fredericksburg		33.92	54.59	US 1 Bus. (Lafayette Boulevard)	
City of Fredericksburg		34.92	56.20	US 17 Bus. / SR 2 (Dixon Street) – Tappahannock, Bowling Green, Shannon Airport	interchange
Stafford		35.61	57.31	SR 3 Bus. west – Fredericksburg	interchange
King George	Arnolds Corner	50.84	81.82	SR 206 east (Dahlgren Road) – Dahlgren, Caledon Natural Area	Western terminus of SR 206
King George	Purkins Corner	53.42	85.97	SR 205 east (Ridge Road) – Edgehill, Colonial Beach	Western terminus of SR 205
King George	Office Hall	54.98	88.48	US 301 (James Madison Parkway) – Baltimore, Richmond	
Westmoreland	Oak Grove	65.00	104.61	SR 205 west (James Monroe Highway) / SR 638 (Leedstown Road) – Colonial Beach	Eastern terminus of SR 205
Westmoreland	Wakefield Corner	67.83	109.16	SR 204 east (Popes Creek Road)	Western terminus of SR 204
Westmoreland	Flat Iron	69.80	112.33	SR 624 (Flat Iron Road)	to former SR 204 west
Westmoreland	Baynesville	72.71	117.02	SR 347 (State Park Road)	Southern terminus of SR 347
Westmoreland	Lerty	73.39	118.11	SR 214 east (Stratford Hall Road) – Stratford Hall	Western terminus of SR 214
Westmoreland	Templeman	81.29	130.82	SR 202 east (Cople Highway) – Mt. Holly, Hague	Western terminus of SR 202
Westmoreland	Templeman			SR 690 (Menokin Road)	former SR 202 west
Richmond	Lyells	87.33	140.54	SR 203 north (Oldhams Road) – Kinsale, Sandy Point	Southern terminus of SR 203
Richmond	Warsaw	89.78	144.49	SR 3 Bus. east (Main Street) – Warsaw	Western terminus of SR 3 Bus.
Richmond	Warsaw	91.01	146.47	US 360 / SR 3 Bus. west (Richmond Road) – Callao, Warsaw, Tappahannock, Richmond	Eastern terminus of SR 3 Bus.
Richmond				SR 642 (Sharps Road) – Sharps	former SR 228 south
Lancaster		105.43	169.67	SR 354 south (River Road) – Litwalton, Bertrand	Northern terminus of SR 354
Lancaster	Lively	110.76	178.25	SR 201 (White Chapel Road) to SR 354 – Heathsville, Belle Isle State Park	
Lancaster				SR 604 (Merry Point Road)	to Merry Point Ferry
Lancaster	Kilmarnock	120.57	194.04	SR 200 north (East Church Street) – Wicomico Church, Burgess, Reedville	Western end of SR 200 concurrency
Lancaster	Kilmarnock	120.66	194.18	SR 200 south (Irvington Road)	Eastern end of SR 200 concurrency
Lancaster	White Stone	125.16	201.43	SR 200 north / SR 695 south (Chesapeake Drive) – Irvington, Palmer, Foxwells, Historic Christ Church	Southern terminus of SR 200; former SR 3 east
Rappahannock River		126.71	203.92	Robert O. Norris Bridge	
Middlesex	Harmony Village	132.55	213.32	SR 33 west (General Puller Highway) – Saluda, Richmond	Western end of SR 33 concurrency
Middlesex	Hartfield	136.00	218.87	SR 33 east (General Puller Highway) – Deltaville	Eastern end of SR 33 concurrency
Piankatank River				Twigg Bridge	
Mathews	Dixie	140.57	226.23	SR 198 east (Buckley Hall Road) – Mathews	Western end of SR 198 concurrency
Mathews	Soles	142.12	228.72	SR 198 west (Buckley Hall Road) to US 17 – Saluda	Eastern end of SR 198 concurrency
Mathews	Fort Nonsense	144.19	232.05	SR 14 east (John Clayton Memorial Highway) – Mathews	Western end of SR 14 concurrency
Gloucester	Gloucester Court House	150.55	242.29	US 17 Bus. / SR 14 west (Main Street) – York River Bridge, Gloucester Historic District	Eastern terminus; eastern end of SR 14 concurrency
1.000 mi = 1.609 km; 1.000 km = 0.621 mi: Concurrency terminus

== Special routes ==
=== Fredericksburg Business Route ===
State Route 3 Business
- Location: Fredericksburg

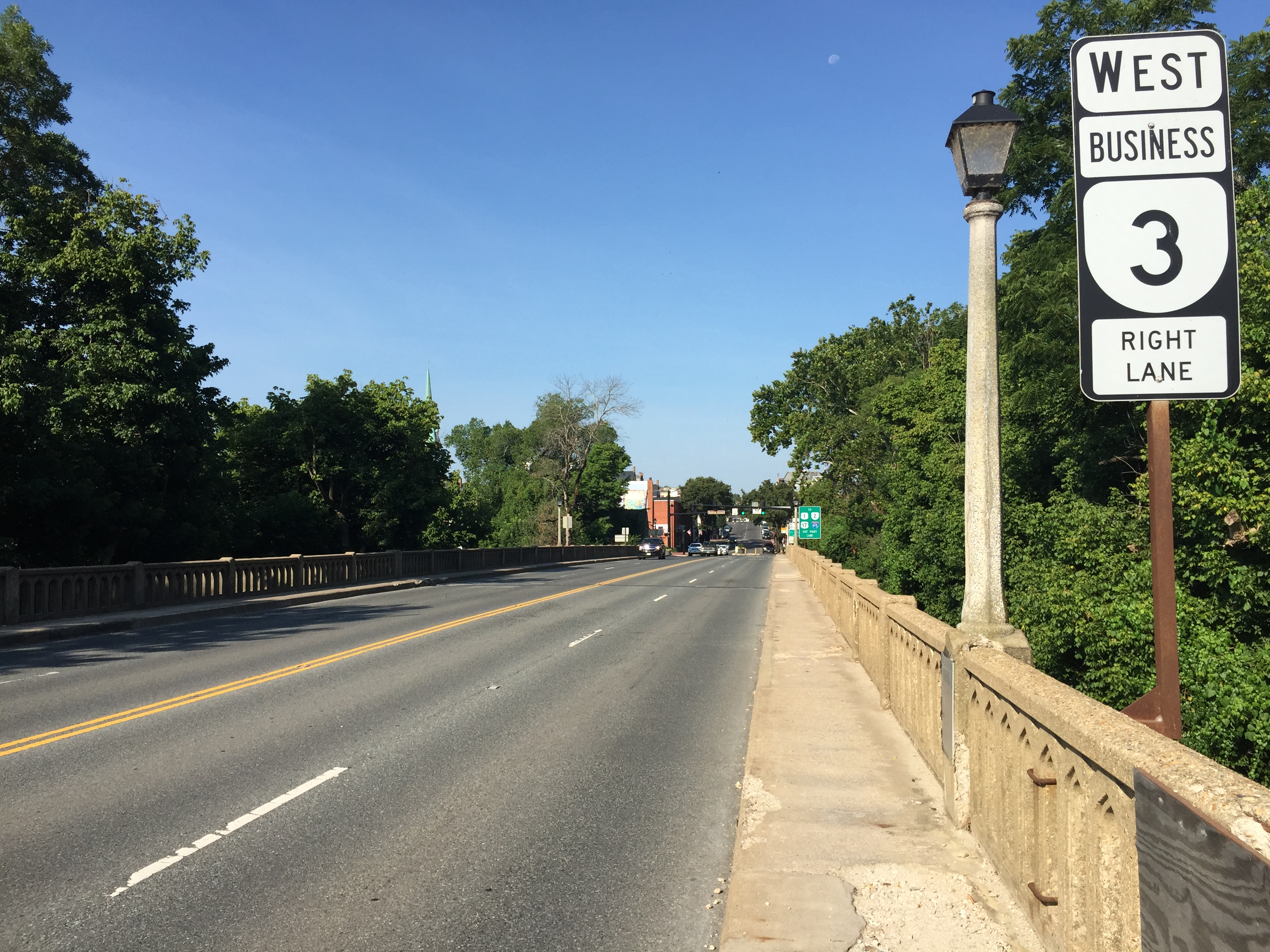
View west along SR 3 Bus. entering Fredericksburg

State Route 3 Business runs through historic Fredericksburg primarily along William Street and the Kings Highway, although a one-way split of the route exists between Washington Avenue and Amelia Street.

=== Warsaw Business Route ===
State Route 3 Business
- Location: Warsaw

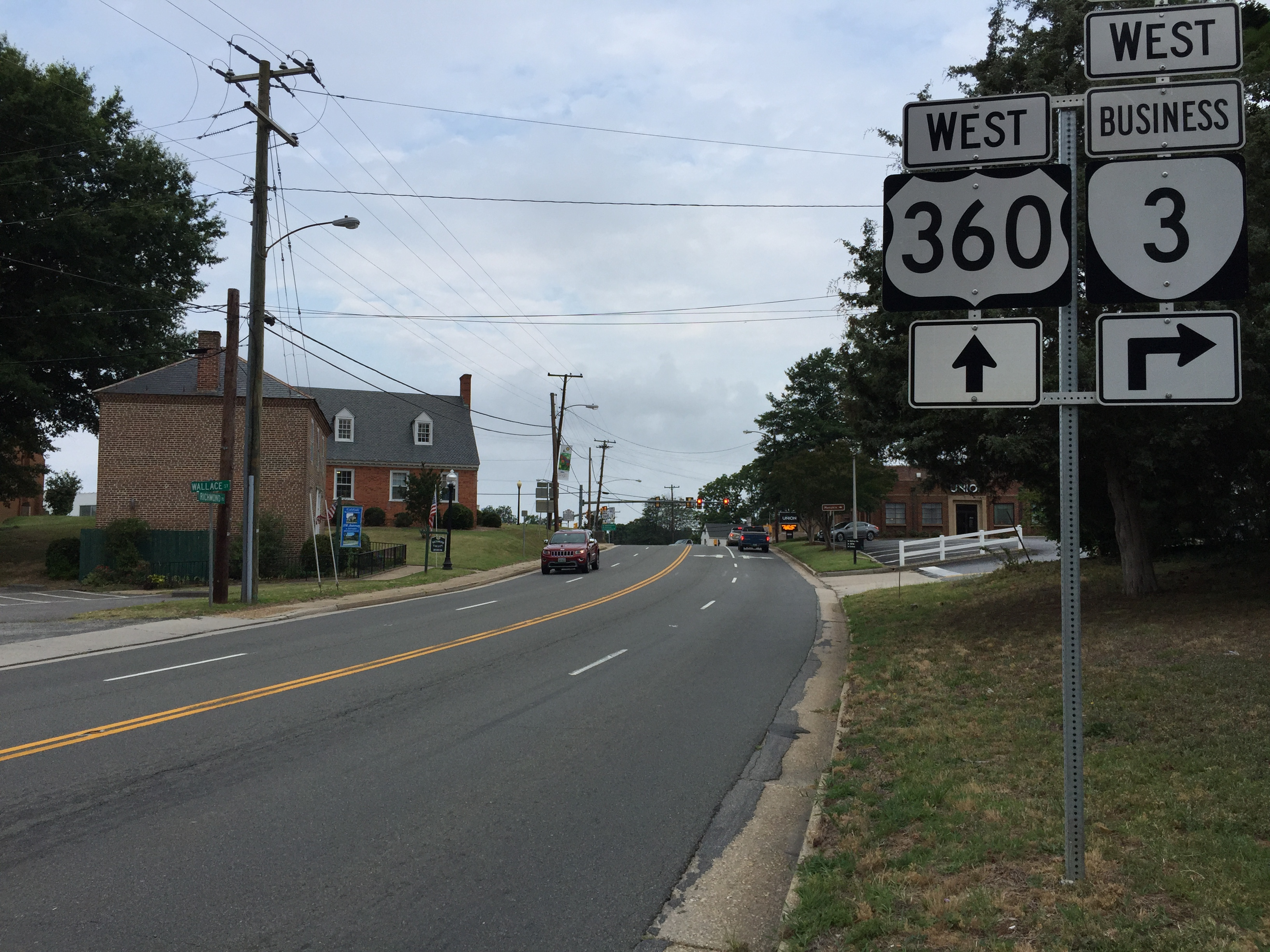
SR 3 Bus. and US 360 in Warsaw

State Route 3 Business in Warsaw includes Main Street and a concurrency with US 360.

< SR 36	Two‑digit State Routes; 1923-1933	SR 38 >
