= Virginia State Route 203 =

State highway in eastern Virginia, US

State Route 203

Route information
- Maintained by VDOT
- Length: 9.76 mi (15.71 km)
- Existed: 1933–present

Major junctions
- South end: SR 3 at Lyells
- SR 202 at Grays Corner
- North end: SR 608 / SR 1007 in Kinsale

Location
- Country: United States
- State: Virginia
- Counties: Richmond, Westmoreland

Highway system
- Virginia Routes; Interstate; US; Primary; Secondary; Byways; History; HOT lanes
← SR 202	→ SR 204

State Route 203 (SR 203) is a primary state highway in the U.S. state of Virginia. Known for most of its length as Oldhams Road, the state highway runs 9.76 miles (15.71 km) from SR 3 at Lyells north to SR 608 and SR 1007 in Kinsale. Though it runs in generally in an east–west direction, the route is signed north–south.

== Route description ==
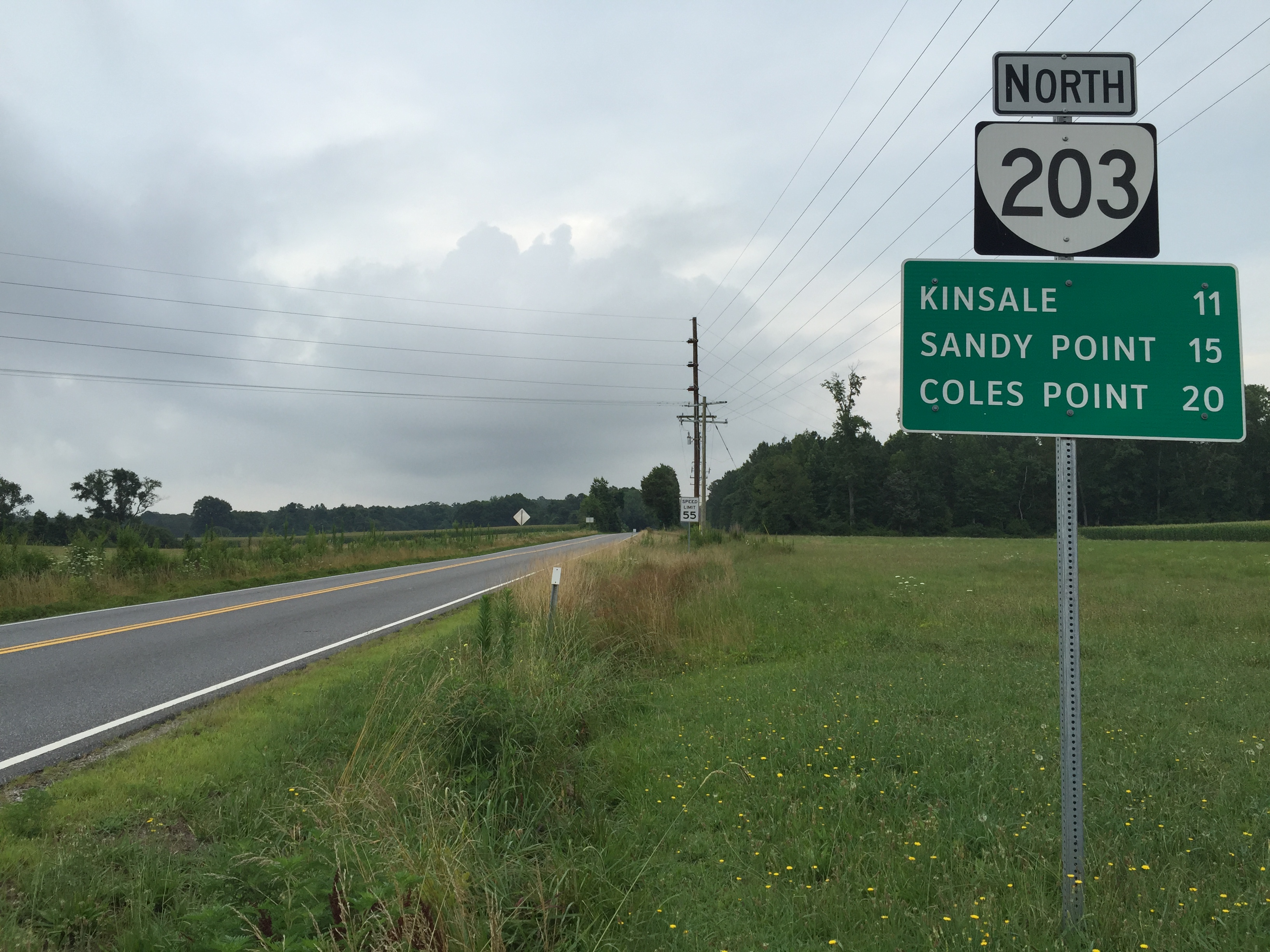
View north at the south end of SR 203 at SR 3 in Lyells

SR 203 begins at an intersection with SR 3 (Historyland Highway) at Lyells on the northern edge of Richmond County. The state highway heads east as Oldhams Road and enters Westmoreland County. SR 203 passes through Threeway and Oldhams before meeting SR 202 (Cople Highway) at Grays Corner. The two highways run concurrently southeast on Cople Highway before SR 203 splits to the northeast as Kinsale Road. Within the village of Kinsale, SR 203 passes through a pair of right-angle turns before reaching its northern terminus at the intersection of SR 608 and SR 1007. SR 608 heads north as a continuation of Kinsale Road, which uses the Kinsale Bridge to cross over the Kinsale Branch of the West Branch of the Yeocomico River.

== Major intersections ==
County	Location	mi	km	Destinations	Notes
Richmond	Lyells	0.00	0.00	SR 3 (Historyland Highway) – Kilmarnock, Fredericksburg	Southern terminus
Westmoreland	Grays Corner	7.43	11.96	SR 202 west (Cople Highway) – Montross	South end of concurrency with SR 202
Westmoreland		8.03	12.92	SR 202 east (Cople Highway) – Callao	North end of concurrency with SR 202
Westmoreland	Kinsale	9.76	15.71	SR 608 (Kinsale Road) / SR 1007 (Steamboat Landing)	Northern terminus
1.000 mi = 1.609 km; 1.000 km = 0.621 mi: Concurrency terminus

< SR 607	District 6 State Routes; 1928–1933	SR 609 >
