= Sandy Point =

Sandy Point may refer to:

== Locations in Africa ==
- Sandy Point, Tristan da Cunha, easternmost point of the island.

== Locations in Australia ==
- Sandy Point, New South Wales, a suburb of Sydney
- Sandy Point, Victoria

== Locations in Canada ==
- Sandy Point, Newfoundland and Labrador, now an island due to erosion
- Sandy Point, Nova Scotia, a town at the southern tip of the peninsula
- Sandy Point 221, an Indian reservation in Alberta

== Locations in the Caribbean ==
- Sandy Point, Bahamas, a town on the island of Great Abaco
- Sandy Point Town, Saint Anne Sandy Point, Saint Kitts and Nevis
- Sandy Point National Wildlife Refuge, Saint Croix, U.S. Virgin Islands
- Sandy Point, U.S. Virgin Islands, settlement on Saint Croix, U.S. Virgin Islands

== Locations in Chile ==
- Sandy Point, Chile, the original English name for Punta Arenas

== Locations in Singapore ==
- Sandy Point, the former name for Tanjong Rhu

== Locations in the United States ==
=== Maine ===
- Sandy Point, Maine near Prospect, Maine

=== Maryland ===
- Sandy Point, Maryland
  - Sandy Point State Park near Annapolis, Maryland, United States
  - Sandy Point Farmhouse, Sandy Point, Maryland, listed on the NRHP in Maryland
  - Sandy Point Shoal Light Station, Skidmore, Maryland, Listed on the NRHP in Maryland
  - Sandy Point Site, Ocean City, Maryland, listed on the NRHP in Maryland

=== Massachusetts ===
- Sandy Point State Reservation on Plum Island, Massachusetts

=== North Carolina ===
- Sandy Point (Edenton, North Carolina), listed on the NRHP in North Carolina

=== Rhode Island ===
- Sandy Point Lighthouse on Prudence Island, Rhode Island
- Sandy Point Island, a small island in Little Narragansett Bay

=== Texas ===
- Sandy Point, Texas, a town of that state

=== Virginia ===
- Sandy Point, Virginia (disambiguation), various locations
  - Sandy Point, a location on the James River in Charles City County, Virginia
  - Sandy Point State Forest, located in King William County, Virginia
  - Sandy Point, Westmoreland County, Virginia, an unincorporated community of that county
  - Sandy Point, Northumberland County, Virginia, an unincorporated community of that county
