= Virginia State Route 202 =

State highway in eastern Virginia, US

State Route 202

Route information
- Maintained by VDOT
- Length: 17.91 mi (28.82 km)
- Existed: 1933–present

Major junctions
- West end: SR 3 at Templeman
- SR 203 at Grays Corner
- East end: US 360 in Callao

Location
- Country: United States
- State: Virginia
- Counties: Westmoreland, Northumberland

Highway system
- Virginia Routes; Interstate; US; Primary; Secondary; Byways; History; HOT lanes
← SR 201	→ SR 203

State Route 202 (SR 202) is a primary state highway in the U.S. state of Virginia. Known for most of its length as Cople Highway, the state highway runs 17.91 miles (28.82 km) from SR 3 at Templeman east to U.S. Route 360 (US 360) in Callao. SR 202 connects several small communities in eastern Westmoreland County with western Northumberland County.

== Route description ==
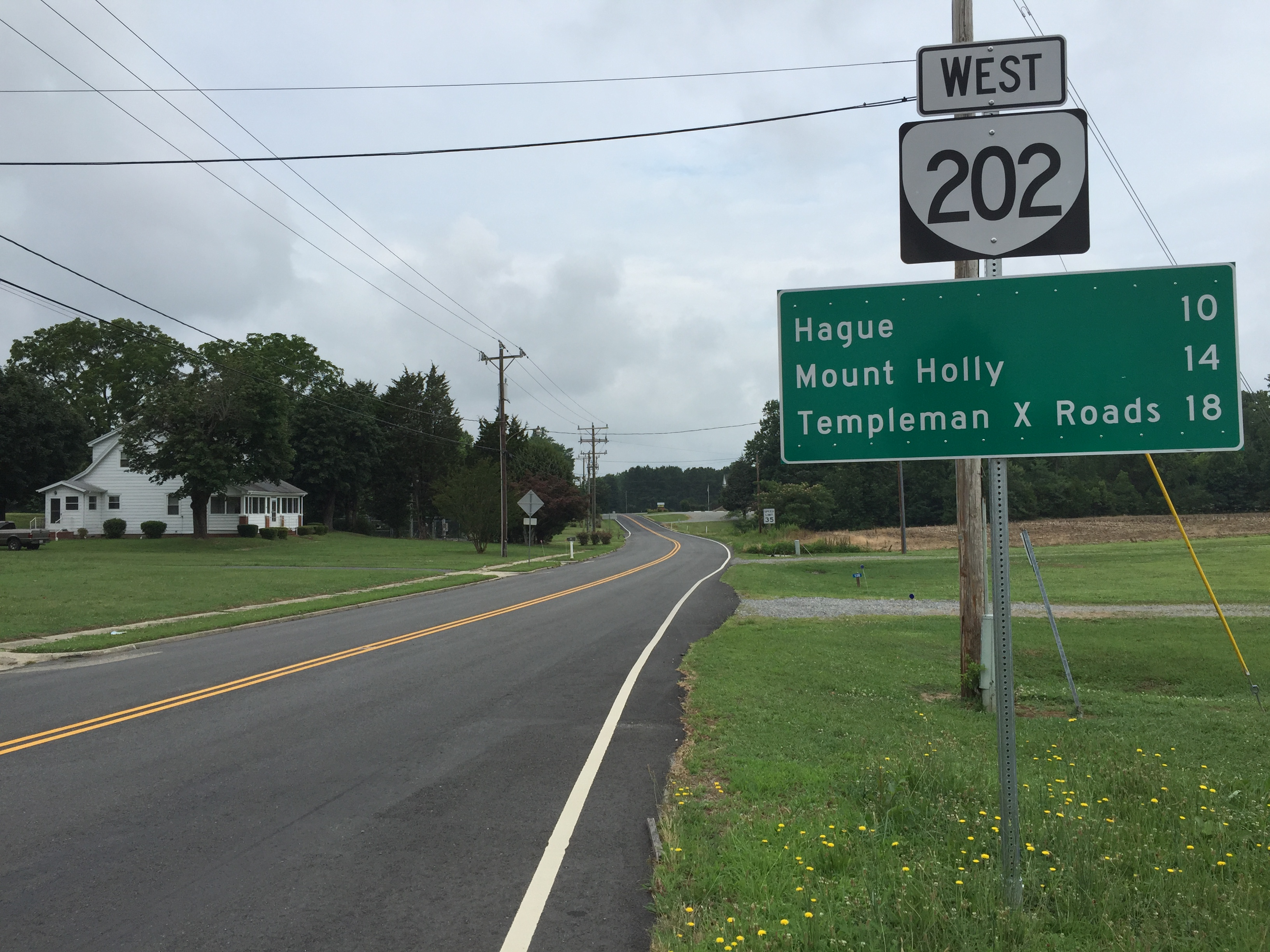
View west at the east end of SR 202 at US 360 in Callao

SR 202 begins at an intersection with SR 3 (Kings Highway) at Templeman. The state highway heads northeast as Cople Highway, which crosses tidewater Nomini Creek and curves southeast at the hamlet of Nomini. SR 202 passes through Machodoc and Hague on its way to Grays Corner, where the highway intersects SR 203 (Oldhams Road). The two highways run concurrently until SR 203 splits northeast as Kinsale Road. SR 202 crosses the Westmoreland–Northumberland county line at its bridge over Hampton Hall Branch of the West Branch of the Yeocomico River. The state highway continues as Hampton Hall Road, which heads south past Morrisons Corner and southeast from Hyacinth to its eastern terminus at US 360 in the village of Callao. The roadway continues east as Northumberland Highway toward the namesake county's seat of Heathsville. US 360 also heads west from the intersection as Richmond Road.

== Major intersections ==
County	Location	mi	km	Destinations	Notes
Westmoreland	Templeman	0.00	0.00	SR 3 (Kings Highway) – Warsaw, Fredericksburg	Western terminus
Westmoreland	Grays Corner	12.58	20.25	SR 203 south (Oldhams Road) – Oldhams	West end of concurrency with SR 203
Westmoreland		13.18	21.21	SR 203 north (Kinsale Road) – Kinsale	East end of concurrency with SR 203
Northumberland	Callao	17.91	28.82	US 360 (Richmond Road / Northumberland Highway) – Reedville, Richmond	Eastern terminus
1.000 mi = 1.609 km; 1.000 km = 0.621 mi: Concurrency terminus

none	Spurs of SR 37; 1923–1928	SR 372 >
< SR 606	District 6 State Routes; 1928–1933	SR 608 >
