= Sandy Point, Virginia =

Sandy Point, Virginia may refer to:

- Sandy Point, Northumberland County, Virginia
- Sandy Point, Westmoreland County, Virginia
- Sandy Point State Forest, located in King William County, Virginia
