= Little Falls =

Little Falls may refer to:

Places in the United States

- Little Falls, Maine
- Little Falls, Minnesota
- Little Falls, New Jersey
  - Little Falls (NJT station)
  - Little Falls Municipal Building
- Little Falls, New York
  - Little Falls City Hall
- Little Falls (town), New York
- Little Falls (Potomac River), a set of rapids downstream of Great Falls near Washington, DC
  - Little Falls Branch (Potomac River)
  - Little Falls Park, Montgomery County, Maryland
  - Little Falls Parkway, Montgomery County, Maryland
- Little Falls, Wisconsin, a town
- Little Falls, Polk County, Wisconsin, an unincorporated community
- Vader, Washington, formerly Little Falls
- Little Falls, Virginia
- Little Falls, West Virginia
- Little Falls Dam, across the Mississippi River near Little Falls, Minnesota
- Little Falls Meetinghouse, a Friends meetinghouse in Fallston, Maryland

Places in Canada

- Little Falls (Hamilton, Ontario), a waterfall
- Little Falls, a community in Ramara, Ontario

Places in South Africa

- Little Falls, a community in Johannesburg

== See also ==
- Little Falls Township, Morrison County, Minnesota
- Little Falls Mets, a defunct minor-league baseball team in Little Falls, New York
