= Dixie, Virginia =

Dixie, Virginia may refer to:

- Dixie, Fluvanna County, Virginia, an unincorporated community
- Dixie, Mathews County, Virginia, an unincorporated community
