= Baynesville, Virginia =

Unincorporated community in Virginia, US

Coordinates: 38°08′52″N 76°52′57″W

- unincorporated community
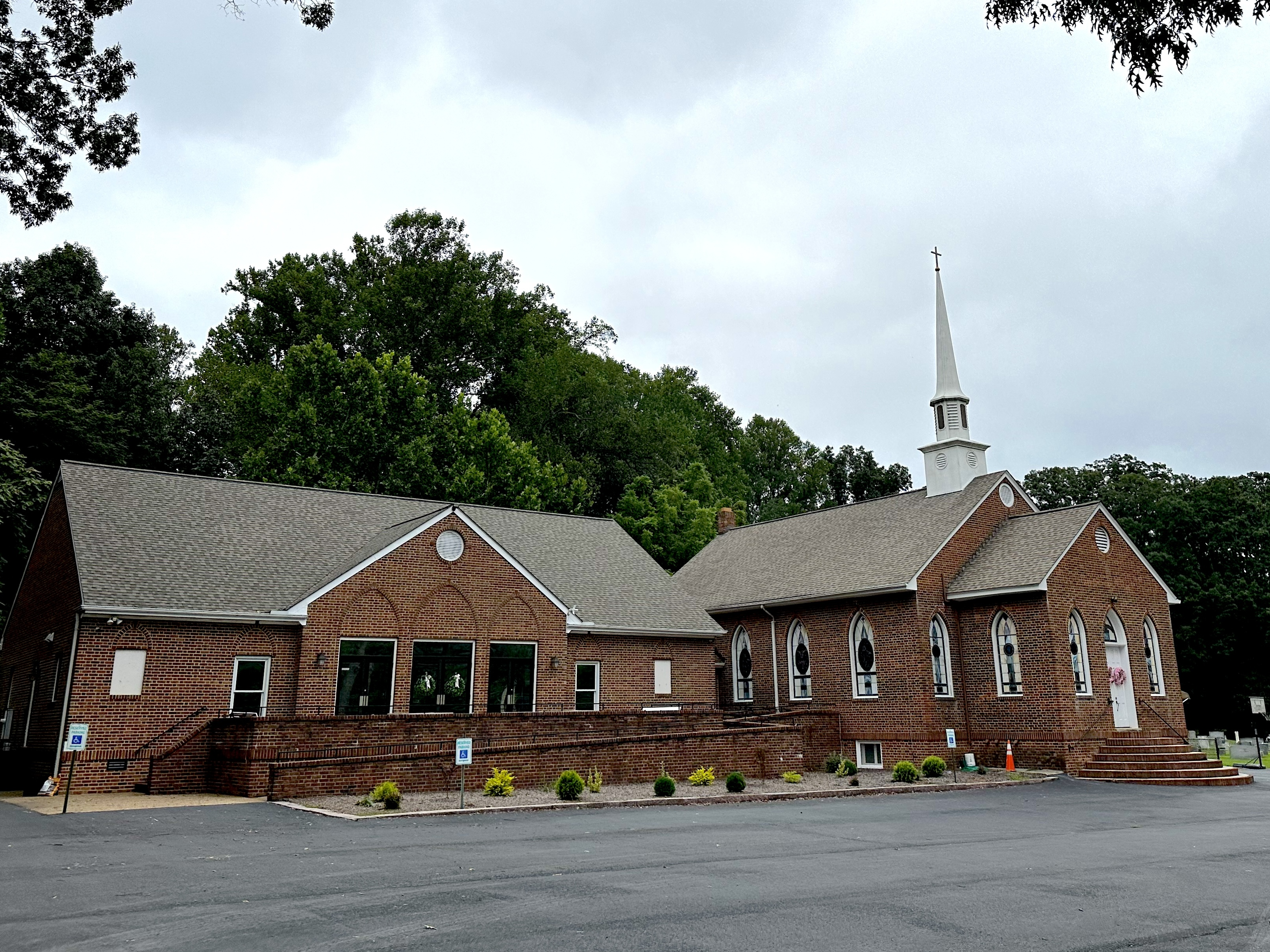
- Pope Creek Baptist Church
- Interactive map of Baynesville, Virginia
- Country: United States
- State: Virginia
- County: Westmoreland
- Time zone: UTC−5 (EST)
  - Summer (DST): EDT
- Area code: 804
- GNIS feature ID: 1492528

Baynesville is an unincorporated community in Westmoreland County, in the U. S. state of Virginia. The community was named after a prominent Virginia family, the Baynes family, who first settled there in the 1600s.

Baynesville was one of the first US communities to have an African-American postmaster: William H Johnson, who was a walnut lumber salesman by trade. The postmaster appointment, made by Congressman William Atkinson Jones, was controversial at the time.

Baynesville became one of five polling stations in Westmoreland County in 1880. It became the site of Westmoreland State Park in 1936. Baynesville is located between Fredericksburg and Montross.

== Geography ==
Baynesville is situated between the Rappahannock River and the Potomac River, southeast of Fredericksburg and 5 miles (8.0 km) northwest of Montross. It is on Virginia State Route 3 near the junction of that road with Virginia State Route 632.

== History ==
=== Early years ===
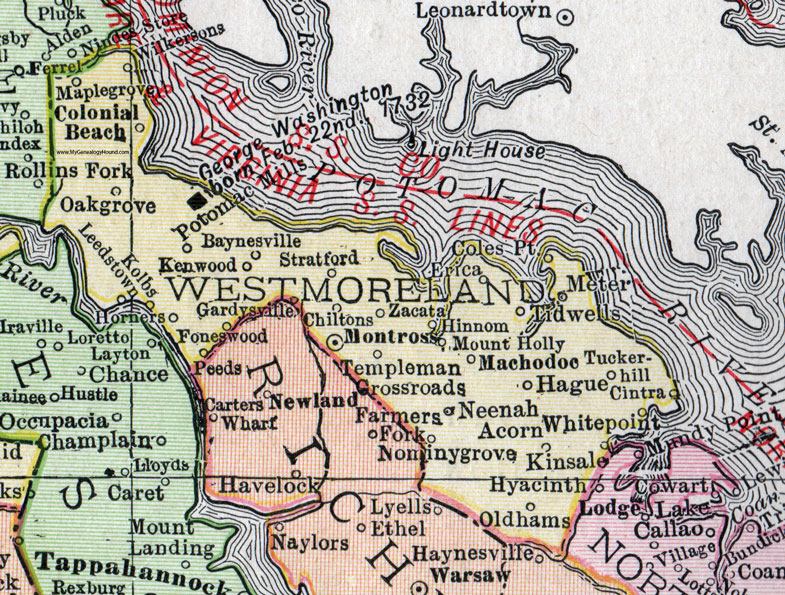
Westmoreland County, Virginia, showing the location of Baynesville

Prior to 1720, the Bayne family settled in this area, and the village of Baynesville is named after this family. The Bayne family obtained 150 acres in the Clifts Planatation area in 1659, and became prominent figures in early Virginia history.

Popes Creek Baptist Church was organized in Baynesville in 1812. The original church burned in 1940, and was replaced with a more modern structure. A post office was established in August 1859.

In 1870, by joint resolution, the Virginia State Legislature named Baynesville a voting precinct in Westmoreland County. The other five communities so named were Montross, Oak Grove, Hague, Warrensville, and Oldham Crossroads. Baynesville's population was 80 in 1880. Around this time, Baynesville was considered a post-village northwest of Montross, called by the Northern Neck News the "quaint and mythical old town of Baynesville". Baynesville's population was 72 in 1900.

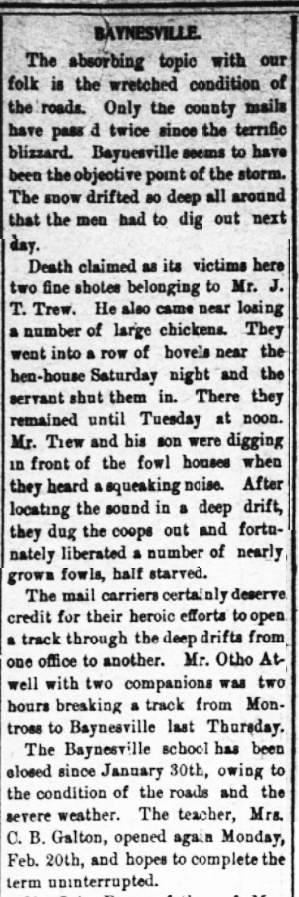
Article describing the Blizzard of 1899 in the Northern Neck of Virginia, affecting Baynesville for almost a month

The Baynesville school burned to the ground in February 1898. The cause of the fire was unknown. Massive snowstorms in Virginia's Northern Neck affected Baynesville in January and February 1899, closing its school for nearly a month, with the Northern Neck News in Warsaw, Virginia, reporting, "The absorbing topic with our folk is the wretched condition of the roads. Only the county mails have passed twice since the terrific blizzard. Baynesville seems to have been the objective point of the storm. The snow drifted so deep all around that the men had to dig out next day[...] The mail carriers certainly deserve credit for their heroic efforts to open a track through the deep drifts from one office to another. Mr. Otho Atwell with two companions was two hours breaking a track from Montross to Baynesville last Thursday. The Baynesville school has been closed since January 30th, owing to the condition of the roads and the severe weather. The teacher, Mrs. O.B. Galton, opened again Monday, Feb. 20th, and hopes to complete the term uninterrupted."

=== Later years ===
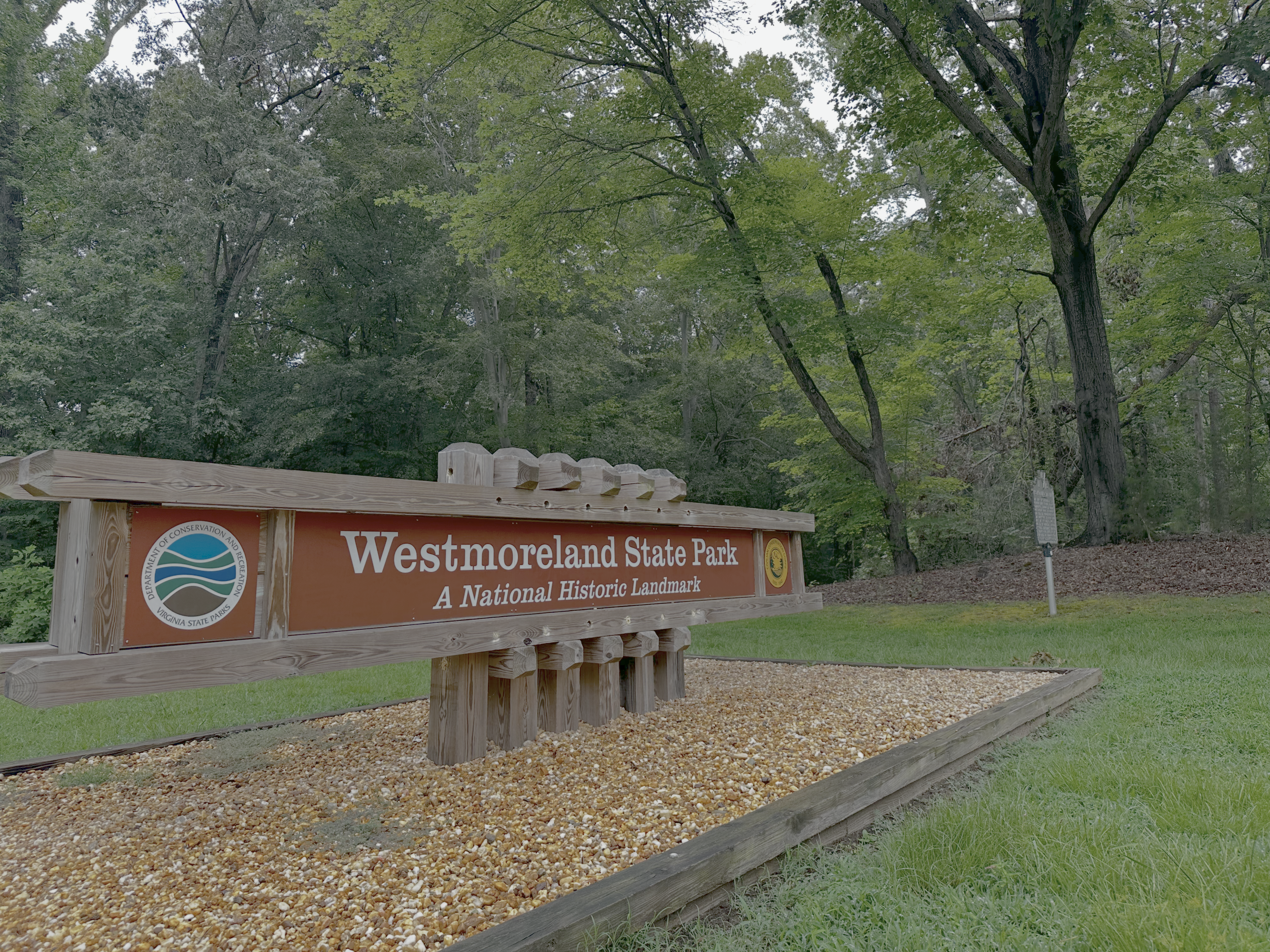
Entrance sign to Westmoreland State Park, in Baynesville

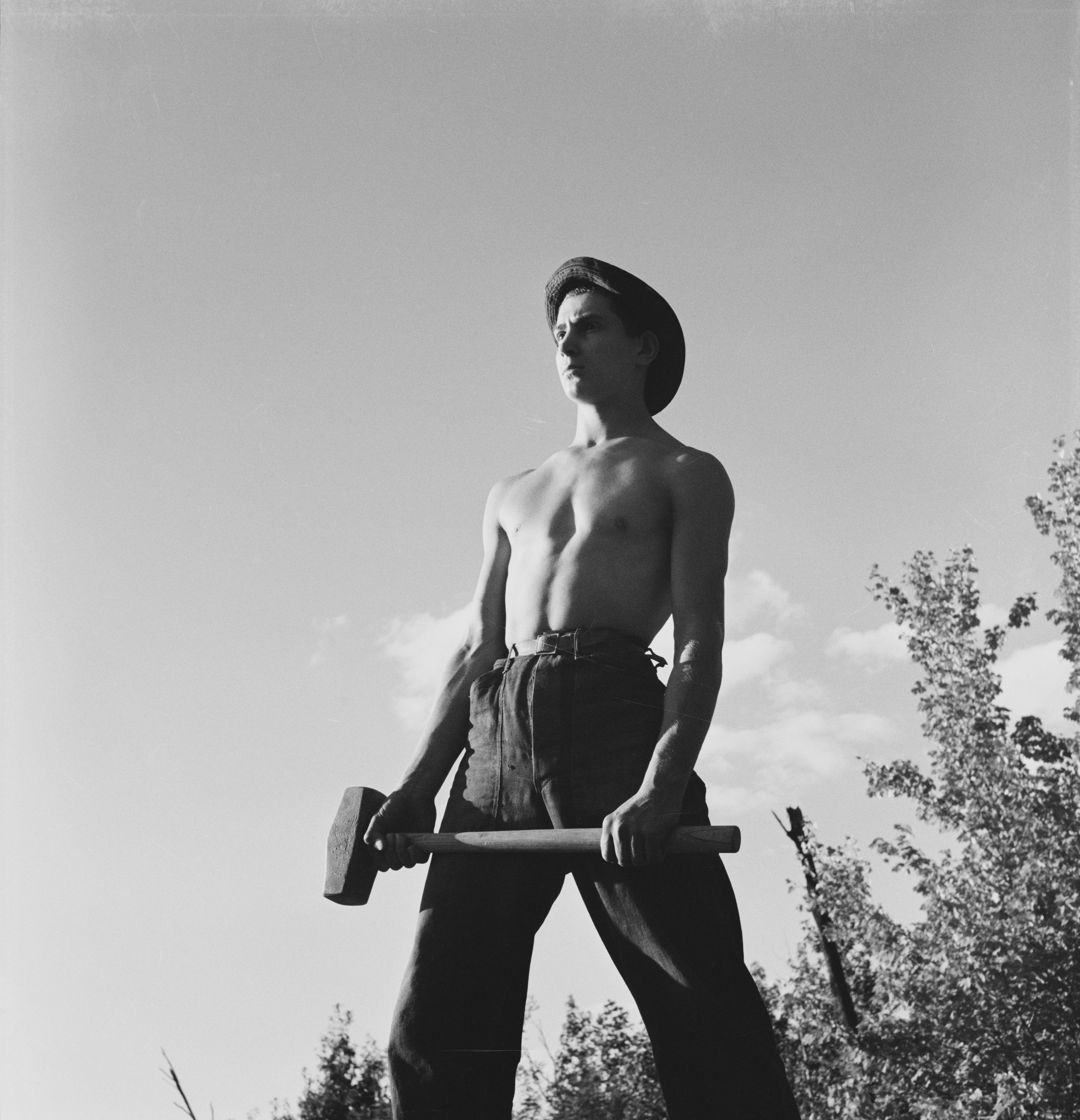
A Civilian Conservation Corps enrollee at Baynesville, 1940

The Baynesville area relied on agriculture, and fruit packing was one industry in the community during the 1930s. Among the packing companies around Baynesville circa 1930 were the Baynesville Fruit Packing Company and the Stratford Packing Company (between Baynesville and nearby Lerty).

In 1936, the Civilian Conservation Corps (CCC) developed the Westmoreland State Park directly north of Baynesville. In May 1941, around 50 Baynesville workers originally from the Westmoreland State Park, who were relocated to Fort Hunt, went on strike, claiming soldiers were stealing their belongings at Fort Hunt. The Baynesville "boys", as they were called, wanted to be returned to their work at Westmoreland State Park, and the phrase "Back to Baynesville or bust!" was adopted as their slogan. The CCC had the boys dishonorably discharged.

Also in May 1941, Charlotte, Grand Duchess of Luxembourg and the Prince of Luxembourg visited Westmoreland State Park in Baynesville, as part of the royal tour of nearby Stratford Hall. The royal couple visited the CCC's hospital, recreation hall, administrative offices, mess hall, commissary, barracks, and supply building, remarking favorably on the facilities.

The Virginia Department of Conservation created a character named Baynesville Bill to promote the history of the CCC and Westmoreland State Park.

Baynesville's population was 82 in 1940.

== Post office ==
The Baynesville post office was established in August 1859, with William Bayne as the postmaster. One later postmaster, J. Smith, was convicted of mail robbery in 1873. The arrest and subsequent conviction made state newspaper headlines. William H Johnson, a resident of Baynesville, served as one of the first African-American postmasters in the US. His service at the Baynesville post office was from November 29, 1893, to October 23, 1897. He had been appointed to the position by Congressman W.A. Jones instead of a disabled Confederate soldier, which caused upset among the Republicans. The appointment was controversial, but according to a news report of the time, Johnson "was endorsed for the position by the [D]emocratic county chairman and other white patrons of the office". William H Johnson's business in Baynesville has also been hailed as an early example of a successful African-American business.

== See also ==
- Lerty, Virginia
