= Lower Church =

Historic church in Virginia, US

- U.S. National Register of Historic Places
- Virginia Landmarks Register
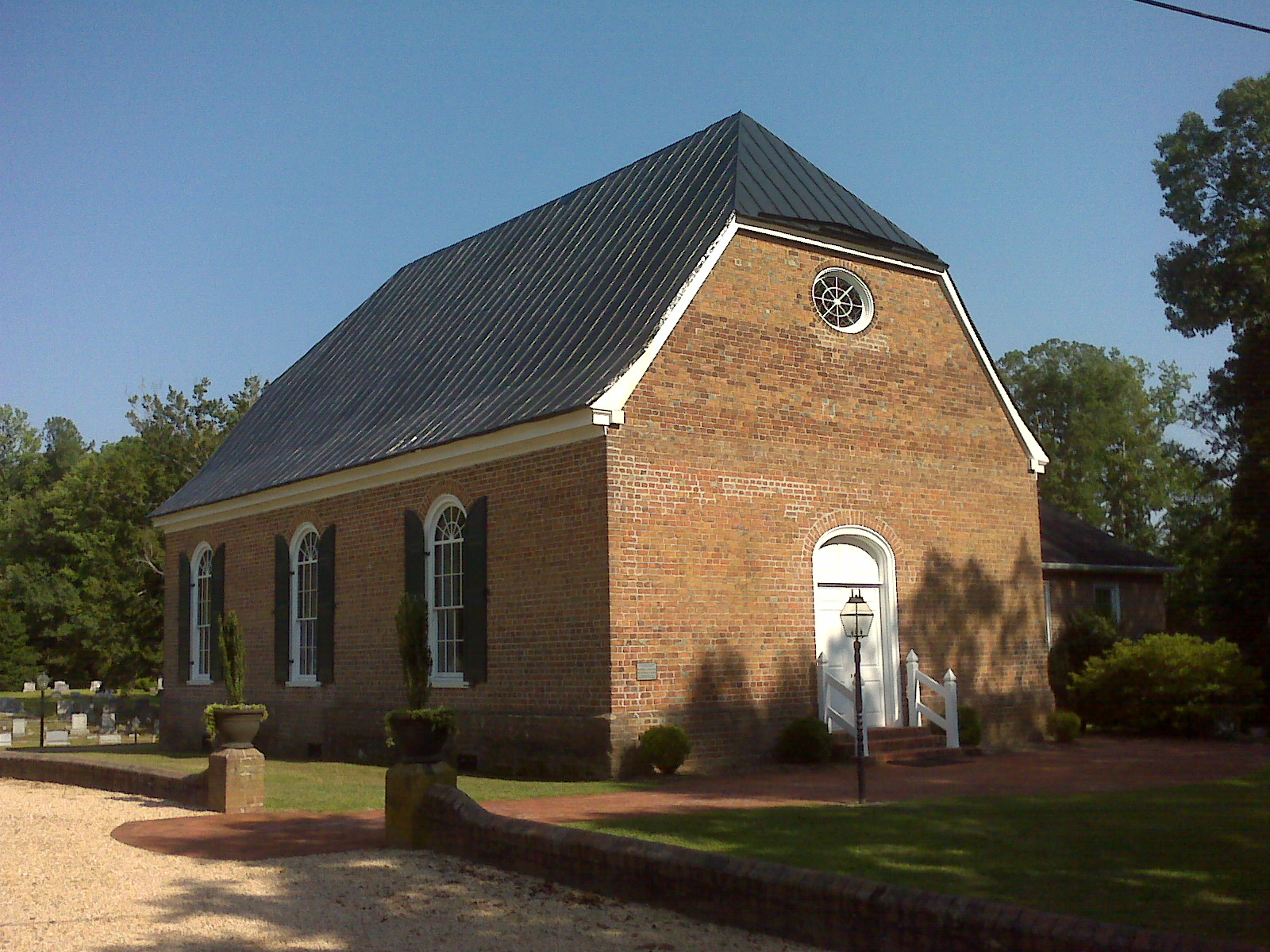
- Lower Church, August 2011

- Location within Virginia Location within the United States
- Location: West of Hartfield on VA 33, near Hartfield, Virginia
- Coordinates: 37°33′8″N 76°27′36″W
- Area: 1 acre (0.40 ha)
- Built: 1717
- Architectural style: Colonial
- NRHP reference No.: 73002038
- VLR No.: 059-0007

Significant dates
- Added to NRHP: April 24, 1973
- Designated VLR: October 17, 1972

Lower Church is a historic Methodist church, formerly an Episcopal church, located near Hartfield, Middlesex County, Virginia. It was constructed in 1717, and is a one-story, rectangular brick building with a clipped gable roof. It measures 56 by 34 feet (17 m × 10 m).

It was listed on the National Register of Historic Places in 1973.
