= Robert O. Norris Bridge =

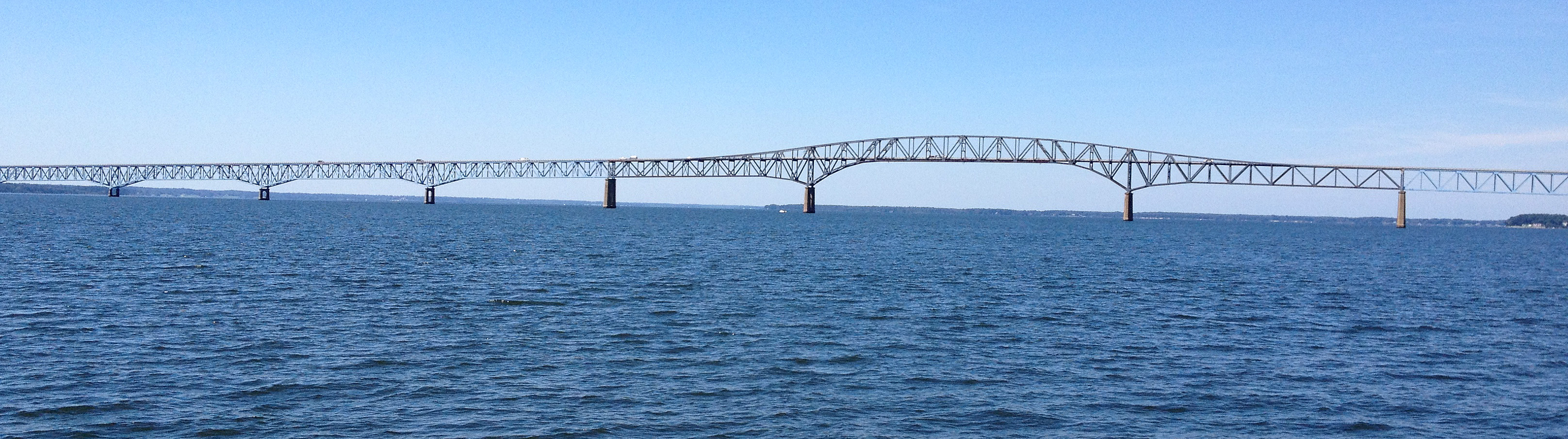
- Viewed from the southeast in 2013
- Coordinates: 37°37′28″N 76°25′23″W
- Carries: 2 lanes of SR 3
- Crosses: Rappahannock River
- Named for: Robert O. Norris Jr.
- Maintained by: Virginia Department of Transportation

Characteristics
- Design: Truss
- Material: Steel
- Total length: 11,237 feet (3,425 m)
- Longest span: 648 feet (198 m)
- No. of lanes: 2

History
- Construction start: 1954
- Opened: August 30, 1957

Statistics
- Daily traffic: 6,100 vehicles (2020)

Location
- Interactive map of Robert O. Norris Bridge

The Robert Opie Norris Jr. Bridge, also known as the White Stone Bridge, is a truss bridge that spans the Rappahannock River in Virginia, United States and serves as the crossing for State Route 3 over the river between Grey's Point on the Middlesex County side and the town of White Stone in Lancaster County. The span was opened on August 30, 1957, and replaced a ferry service directly West of where the current bridge is located. Commonly known by locals as the White Stone Bridge or Rappahannock River Bridge, this span is a critical crossing between the Lower Middle Peninsula and the Northern Neck as the next closest crossing is over 30 miles (48 km) upstream near Tappahannock. Traffic forced to utilize a detour over the upstream crossing could potentially travel over 90 miles (140 km). The Norris Bridge is 11,237 feet (3,425 m) long, and provides a Mean High Water clearance of 110 feet (34 m) under the center span with a channel depth of over 60 feet (18 m). The bridge is maintained by the Virginia Department of Transportation. When first opened, the bridge was crossed by just over 1,000 vehicles per day, on average. Tolls were removed from the bridge in 1976, and by 1978 the average daily traffic had risen to over 2,500 vehicles per day. By 2006, traffic counts reached 11,309 vehicles per day but shrank to 6,900 Annual Average Daily Traffic in 2017.

== History ==
Originally initiated on November 16, 1938 by the creation of the Lower Rappahannock Bridge Commission, planning work on the bridge began in earnest in 1950, and construction began in 1954. Four workers were killed in construction accidents on the bridge.

== Present Day ==
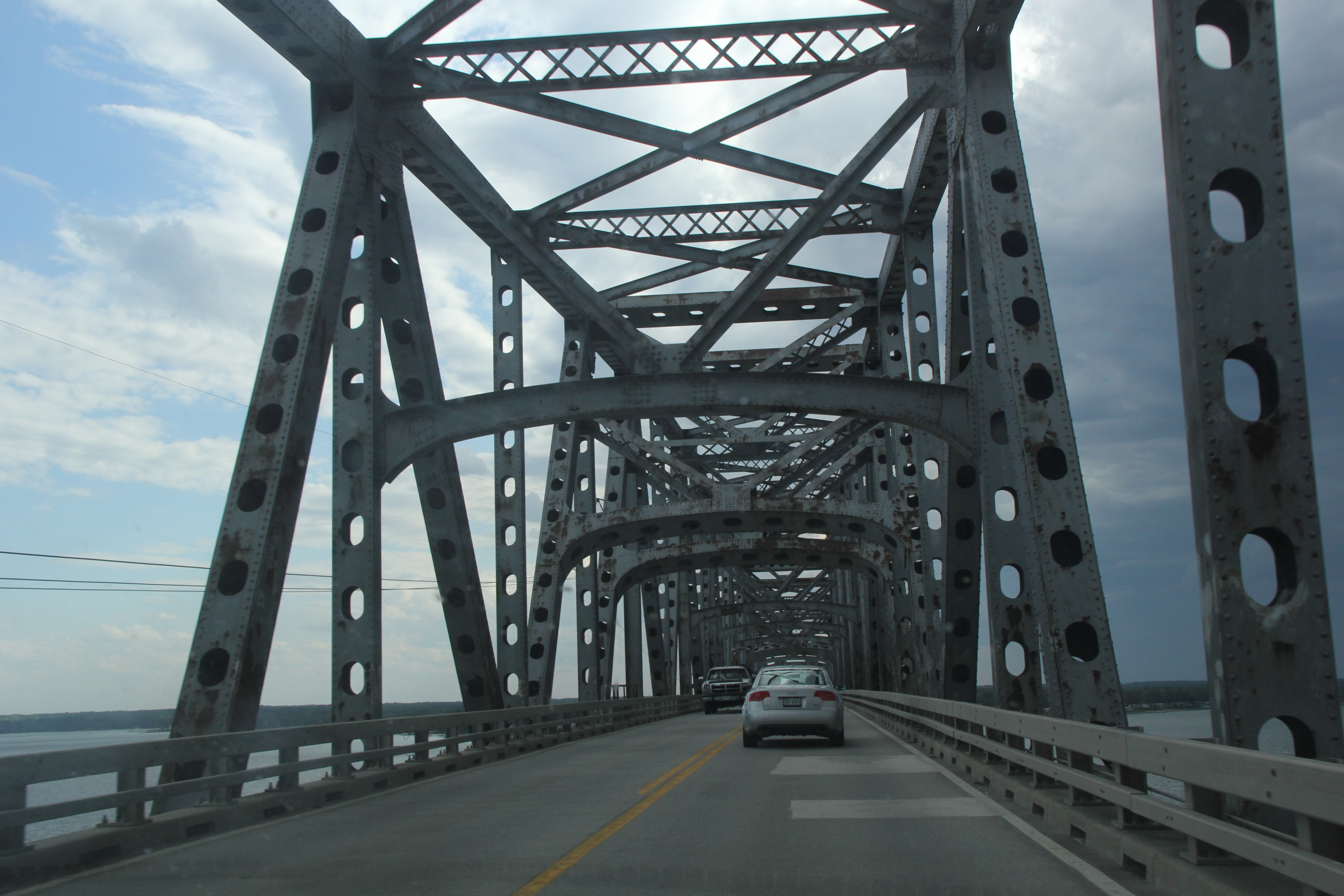
Crossing the Robert O. Norris Bridge (2016)

Between the opening of the bridge and the placement of the current traffic safety barrier, there have been two known fatal accidents involving cars crashing off the bridge into the water below.

Prior to July 2021, Dominion Virginia Power operated a 115 kilovolt (kV) transmission line that was attached to the East side of the bridge. This bridge-mounted 115 kV transmission line was removed after a replacement underwater 115 kV transmission line was brought online. This transmission line replacement was identified by Dominion Power as a needed project in order to remove risk of violating mandated NERC standards. Increased inspection routines relating to the age of the bridge itself required the attached transmission line be de-energized each time the inspections were carried out. The Virginia State Corporation Commission (SCC) later ordered Dominion Power to route the new transmission line underwater.

== Future ==
The Robert O. Norris Bridge has been identified as a State of Good Repair Infrastructure asset in that the pavement and superstructure of the bridge are deemed structurally deficient and replacement should be performed at or before the end of its 75 year design lifespan in 2032. In addition, the Norris Bridge has been identified as being 'fracture-critical' and the failure of one span could cause the total collapse of the structure much like the collapse of Minneapolis, Minnesota's I-35W Bridge in August 2007.

On April 15th, 2025, Virginia's Office of The Governor released a statement outlining plans for the future of the bridge. The released plans include a plan to begin construction to replace the bridge in 2028.
