= James Store, Virginia =

Unincorporated community in Virginia, United States

- Unincorporated community
- Location within Virginia Location within the United States
- Coordinates: 37°27′59″N 76°27′19″W
- Country: United States
- State: Virginia
- County: Gloucester
- Elevation: 43 ft (13 m)
- Time zone: UTC-5 (Eastern (EST))
  - Summer (DST): UTC-4 (EDT)
- ZIP code: 23128
- Area code: 804
- GNIS feature ID: 1468633

James Store is an unincorporated community in Gloucester County, Virginia, United States. James Store is located on Virginia State Route 3 and Virginia State Route 14, 5.3 miles (8.5 km) northeast of Gloucester. James Store had a post office, which closed on September 7, 1996.
