= Fox Hill Plantation =

Historic house in Virginia, United States

- U.S. National Register of Historic Places
- Virginia Landmarks Register
- Location within Virginia Location within the United States
- Location: SW of Lively off VA 201, near Lively, Virginia
- Coordinates: 37°45′14″N 76°32′46″W
- Area: 14 acres (5.7 ha)
- NRHP reference No.: 78003026
- VLR No.: 051-0009

Significant dates
- Added to NRHP: November 17, 1978
- Designated VLR: April 18, 1978

Fox Hill Plantation is a historic plantation house located near Lively, Lancaster County, Virginia, United States. It was built about 1820, and is a two-story, five-bay, L-shaped brick dwelling with a hipped roof. It is a variation of the "I-house". Also on the property are the contributing two-story, three-bay brick kitchen and pyramidal-roofed smokehouse.

It was listed on the National Register of Historic Places in 1978.
