= Robley, Virginia =

Robley
- Unincorporated community
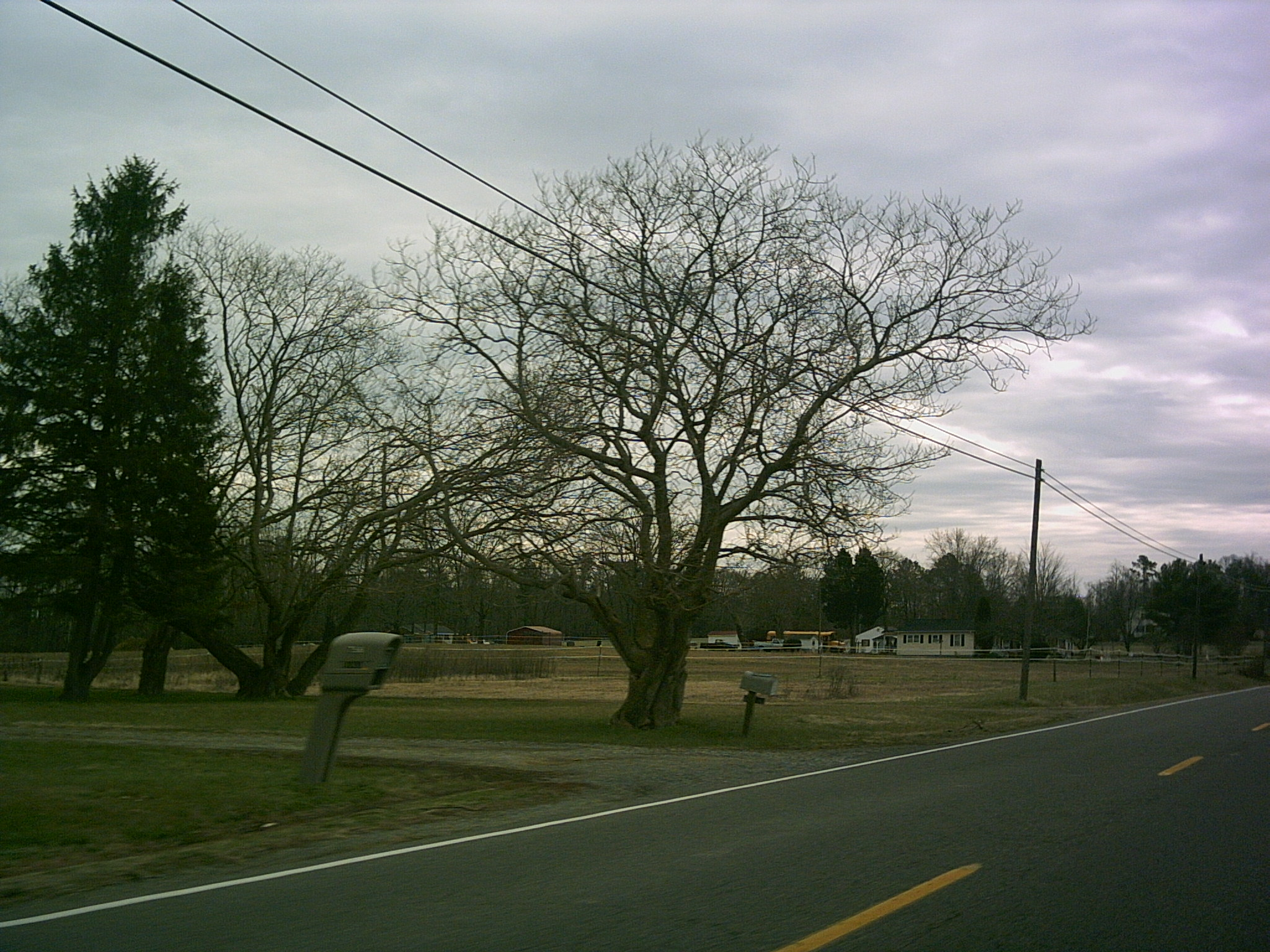
- Robley, Virginia

- Location within the Commonwealth of Virginia Robley (the United States)
- Coordinates: 37°50′48″N 76°34′49″W
- Country: United States
- State: Virginia
- County: Richmond
- Time zone: UTC−5 (Eastern (EST))
  - Summer (DST): UTC−4 (EDT)

Robley (also Issabel, Marvin, or Point Isabel) is an unincorporated community in southeastern Richmond County, Virginia, United States. It lies along State Route 3 southeast of the town of Warsaw, the county seat of Richmond County. Its elevation is 115 feet (35 m).

Previously called "Point Issabel" or "Point Isabelle" (or similar) it was renamed in 1918.
