= Robert O. Norris Jr. =

American politician (1880–1960)

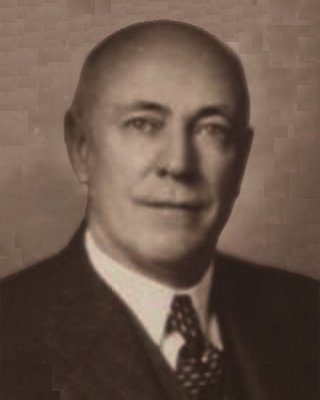
- Official portrait, 1944

President pro tempore of the Virginia Senate
- In office January 10, 1945 – January 11, 1950
- Preceded by: Henry T. Wickham
- Succeeded by: Morton G. Goode

Member of the Virginia Senate
- In office January 24, 1928 – January 11, 1956
- Preceded by: Thomas J. Downing
- Succeeded by: Thomas H. Blanton
- Constituency: 30th district (1928–1936); 31st district (1936–1956)

Member of the Virginia House of Delegates for Lancaster and Richmond
- In office January 10, 1912 – January 24, 1928
- Preceded by: R. Carter Wellford
- Succeeded by: Raymond Sisson

Personal details
- Born: Robert Opie Norris Jr. November 4, 1880 Lively, Virginia, U.S.
- Died: June 21, 1960 (aged 79) Richmond, Virginia, U.S.
- Resting place: White Chapel Episcopal Church Cemetery near Lively, Virginia, U.S.
- Party: Democratic
- Spouse: Lelia Fauntleroy Claybrook (m. 1922)
- Children: 2
- Education: Richmond College (LLB)
- Occupation: Lawyer; politician

Robert Opie Norris Jr. (November 4, 1880 – June 21, 1960) was an American Democratic politician who served as a member of the Virginia House of Delegates and Senate. He was the Senate's President pro tempore from 1945 to 1950.

== Early life ==
Robert O. Norris Jr. was born in Lively, Virginia. He studied at Randolph-Macon Academy and the University of Richmond.

== Career ==
Following graduation, Norris practiced law in Lively and was a member of the law firm Norris, Richardson, Clarke and Foster. In 1940, Norris was president of the Virginia State Bar Association.

Norris was a Democrat. He served as a member in the Virginia House of Delegates from 1912 to 1928 and then as a member in the Virginia Senate. He served as the President pro tempore from 1945 to 1950. He served on various committees, including the senate steering, privileges and elections, courts of justice, fish and game, and interstate commerce committees. He became chairman of the senate finance committee in 1950. For three months in 1944, he left the senate to serve as a member of the state corporation commission. He was afterward re-elected. He retired on January 1, 1955. In 1952, he opposed the redistricting of his senatorial district. Following his arguments, Stafford County and Prince William County were added to his district. In the fall of 1952, he withdrew as a presidential elector to support Republican presidential nominee Dwight Eisenhower.

== Personal life ==
Norris married Lelia Fauntleroy Claybrook, daughter of Baptist minister F. W. Claybrook, in February 1922. They had a daughter and son, Mrs. Dixon Foster and Robert O. III. In 1950, he became president of the Northern Neck Historical Society and had a large collection of Northern Neck and Virginia history.

Towards the end of his career, Norris was a patient at the Medical College of Virginia Hospital a number of times. He died on June 21, 1960, at a hospital in Richmond. He was buried at White Chapel Episcopal Church Cemetery near Lively.

== Legacy ==
In 1957, the Robert O. Norris Bridge that spans the Rappahannock River between Lancaster and Middlesex counties was named in his honor.

Virginia House of Delegates
Preceded by R. Carter Wellford	Virginia Delegate for Lancaster and Richmond; 1912–1928	Succeeded by Raymond Sisson
Senate of Virginia
Preceded by Thomas J. Downing	Virginia Senator for the 31st District; 1928–1936	Succeeded by Henry T. Wickham
Preceded by John W. Rust	Virginia Senator for the 30th District; 1936–1956	Succeeded by Thomas H. Blanton
Preceded by Henry T. Wickham	President pro tempore of the Senate of Virginia; 1945–1950	Succeeded by Morton G. Goode
