= Office Hall, Virginia =

Unincorporated community in Virginia, United States

- Unincorporated community
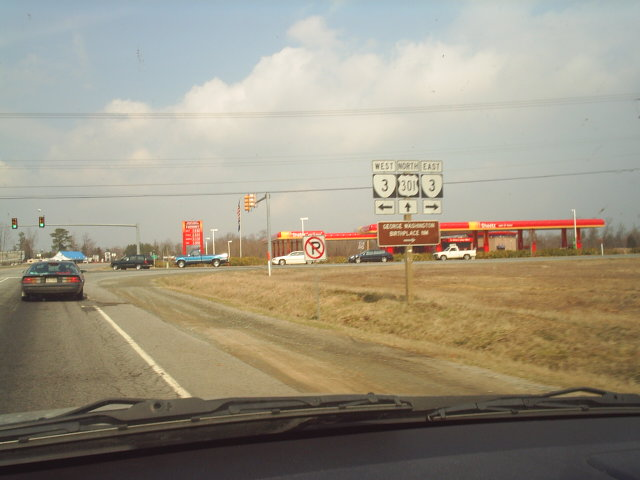
- Northbound US 301 as it approaches VA 3 in Office Hall

- Location within Virginia and the United States Office Hall (the United States)
- Coordinates: 38°14′20″N 77°09′01″W
- Country: United States
- State: Virginia
- County: King George
- Time zone: UTC−5 (Eastern (EST))
  - Summer (DST): UTC−4 (EDT)

Office Hall is an unincorporated community in King George County, Virginia, United States. The main roads in Office Hall are U.S. Route 301 and Virginia State Route 3.
