= Wheatland (Callao, Virginia) =

Historic house in Virginia, United States

- U.S. National Register of Historic Places
- Virginia Landmarks Register
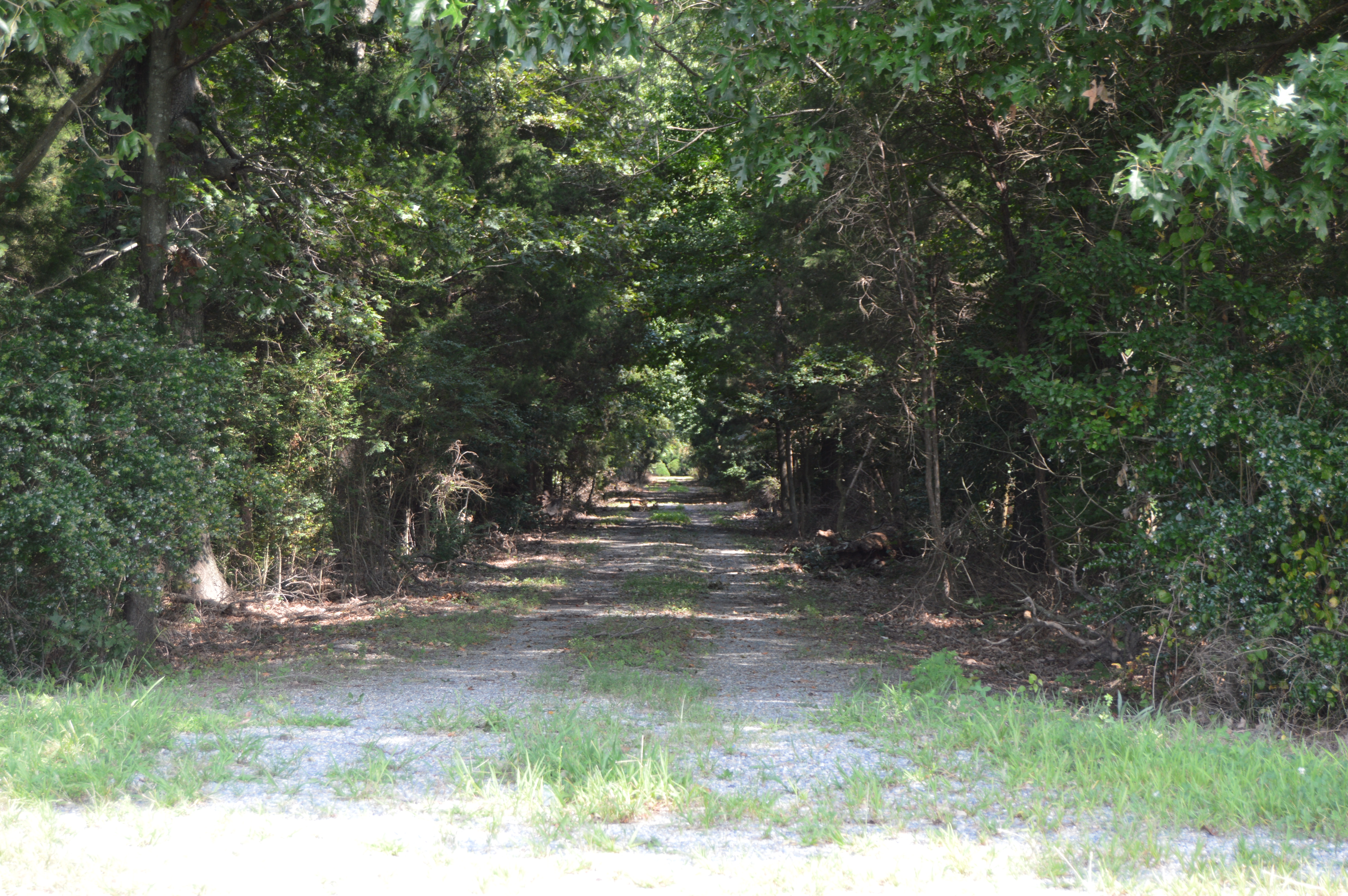
- Entrance to the property

- Location within Virginia Location within the United States
- Location: VA 624, Callao, Virginia
- Coordinates: 38°00′01″N 76°30′47″W
- Area: 12 acres (4.9 ha)
- Built: 1848
- Architectural style: Greek Revival, Federal
- NRHP reference No.: 87000015
- VLR No.: 066-0013

Significant dates
- Added to NRHP: November 15, 1988
- Designated VLR: April 15, 1986

Wheatland is a historic plantation house located at Callao, Northumberland County, Virginia, United States. It was built between 1848 and 1850, and consists of a 2 1/2-story, five-bay, Federal style frame main block flanked by symmetrical 1 1/2-story wings. It measures 96 feet long, and is topped by a gable roof. The front and rear facades features two-tier Doric order porticos. Also on the property are the contributing kitchen (c. 1848–1850), office (c. 1848–1850), North Yard and South Yard houses (c. 1848–1850), barn (late-19th / early-20th century), tenant house (c. 1920–1935), and early 20th century smokehouse.

It was listed on the National Register of Historic Places in 1988.
