= Soles, Virginia =

Unincorporated community in Virginia, US

Coordinates: 37°29′34″N 76°26′13″W

Soles is an unincorporated community in Mathews County, in the U. S. state of Virginia.
