= Hartfield, Virginia =

Unincorporated community in Virginia, United States

- Unincorporated community
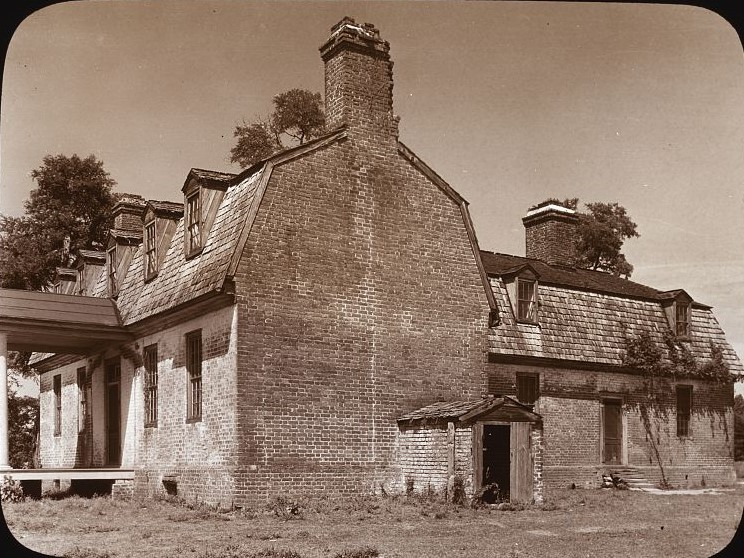
- Wilton-on-the-Piankatank, Middlesex County, Virginia, by Frances Benjamin Johnston, 1935

- Location within Virginia Location within the United States
- Coordinates: 37°33′04″N 76°26′46″W
- Country: United States
- State: Virginia
- County: Middlesex
- Elevation: 79 ft (24 m)
- Time zone: UTC-5 (Eastern (EST))
  - Summer (DST): UTC-4 (EDT)
- ZIP code: 23071
- Area code: 804
- GNIS feature ID: 1499528

Hartfield is an unincorporated community in Middlesex County, Virginia, United States. Hartfield is located at the southern junction of Virginia State Route 3 and Virginia State Route 33, 9 miles (14 km) east-southeast of Saluda. Hartfield has a post office with ZIP code 23071, which opened on September 5, 1889.

William Churchill, patriarch of one of the first Virginia's colonial families, built Wilton House in Hartfield in 1763. Wilton House is a T-shaped Georgian plantation house near the Piankatank River in the Tidewater region on Virginia's Middle Peninsula. It is now open as a guest house.
