= Lively, Virginia =

Unincorporated community in Virginia, United States

- Unincorporated community
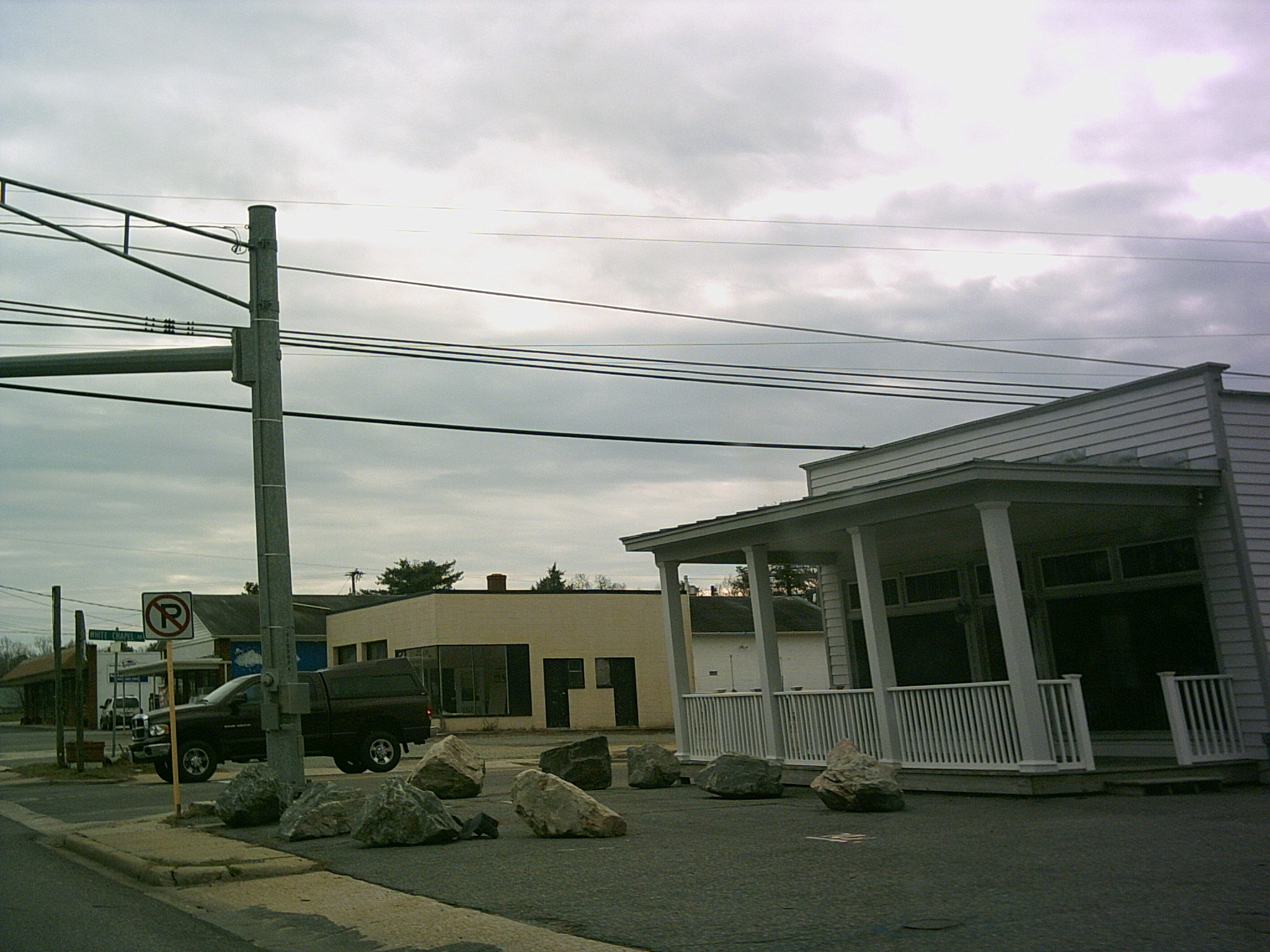
- Central Lively

- Location in Virginia Location in the United States
- Coordinates: 37°46′40″N 76°30′49″W
- Country: United States
- State: Virginia
- County: Lancaster
- Time zone: UTC−5 (Eastern (EST))
  - Summer (DST): UTC−4 (EDT)
- ZIP code: 22507

Lively is an unincorporated community in Lancaster County in the U. S. state of Virginia. Mary Ball Washington, mother of George Washington, was born in Lively.

The origin of the name "Lively" is obscure. Fox Hill Plantation and St. Mary's, Whitechapel are listed on the National Register of Historic Places.

State delegate Robert O. Norris, Jr. was born in Lively.

== Demographics ==
The town has no police force of its own, but is protected by Lancaster County Sheriff's Office. Emergency medical services are provided by the Upper Lancaster Volunteer Rescue Squad, and fire suppression by the Upper Lancaster Volunteer Fire Department.
