= Nomini Grove, Virginia =

Unincorporated community in Virginia, US

Coordinates: 38°02′06″N 76°44′54″W

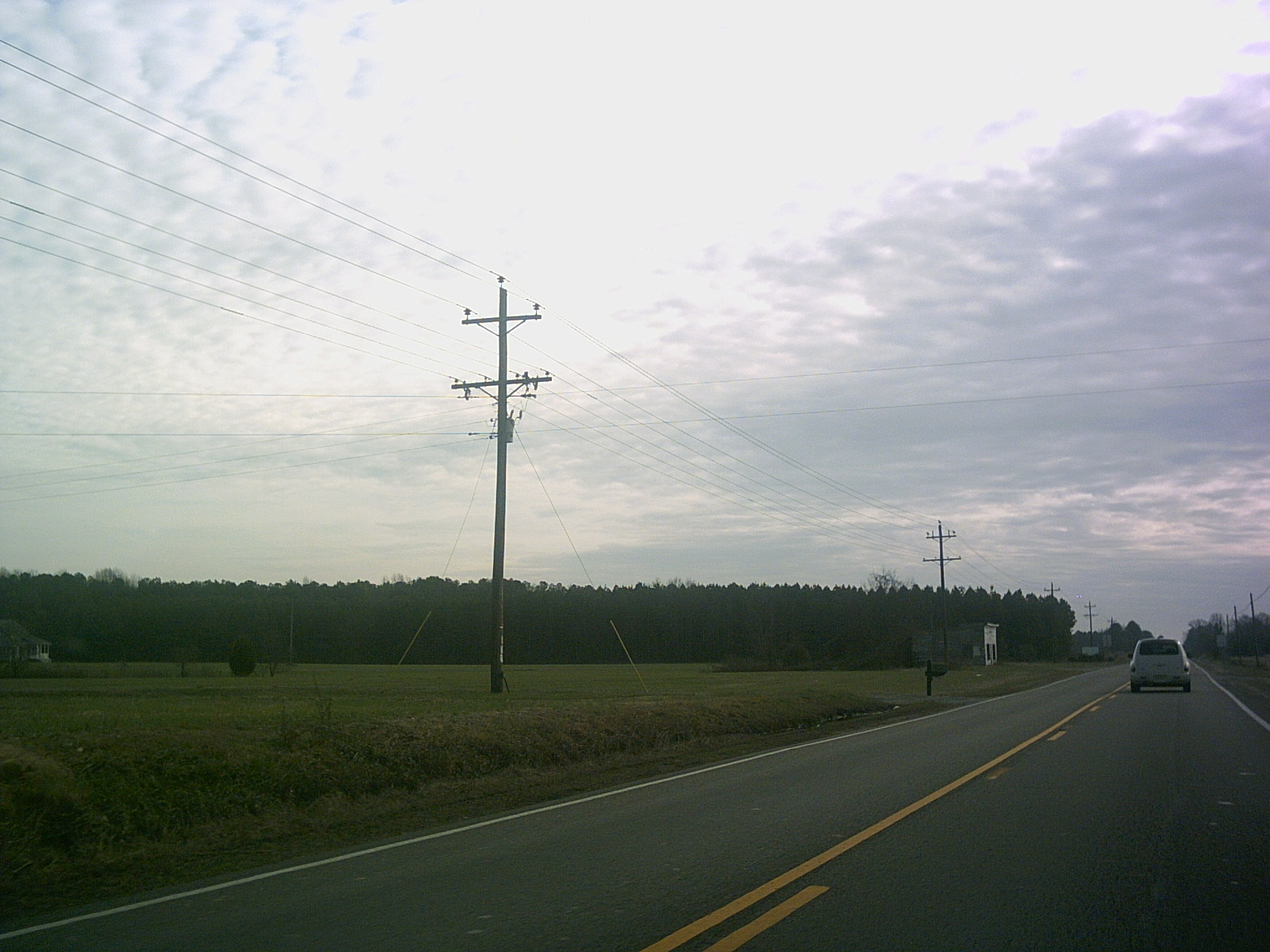
Roadside scene in Nomini Grove

Nomini Grove is an unincorporated community in Westmoreland County, in the U. S. state of Virginia.

== History ==
A post office has been in operation at Nomini Grove since 1848. Nomini is a name derived from a Native American language meaning "deep current".
