= Threeway, Virginia =

Unincorporated community in Virginia, US

Coordinates: 37°59′33″N 76°41′57″W

Threeway is an unincorporated community in Westmoreland County, in the U. S. state of Virginia. Located at the junction of routes 203 and 620, it was previously the site of a post office and was known as Cary's Corner in the 19th century.
