= Westmoreland State Park =

State park in Virginia, U.S.

- IUCN category III (natural monument or feature)
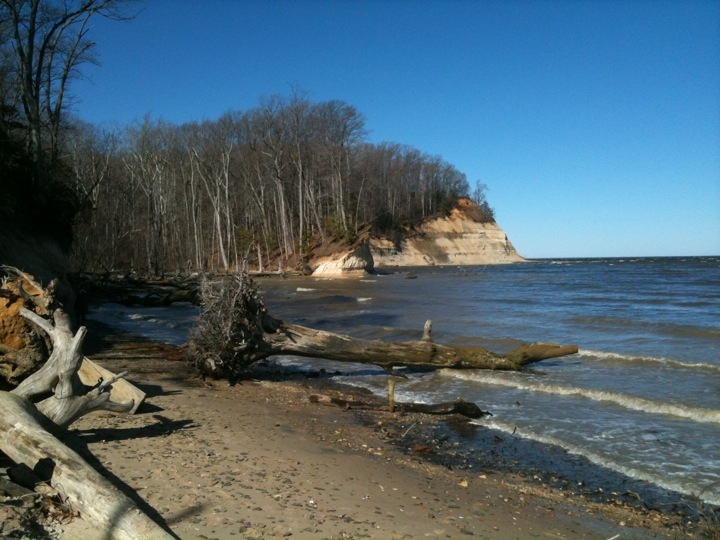
- Potomac River shoreline within Westmoreland State Park
- Interactive map of Westmoreland State Park
- Location: Virginia
- Nearest city: Montross
- Coordinates: 38°9′45″N 76°51′58″W
- Area: 1,321 acres (5.35 km^{2})
- Established: June 1936
- Governing body: Virginia Department of Conservation and Recreation
- Westmoreland State Park Historic District
- U.S. National Register of Historic Places
- U.S. Historic district
- Virginia Landmarks Register
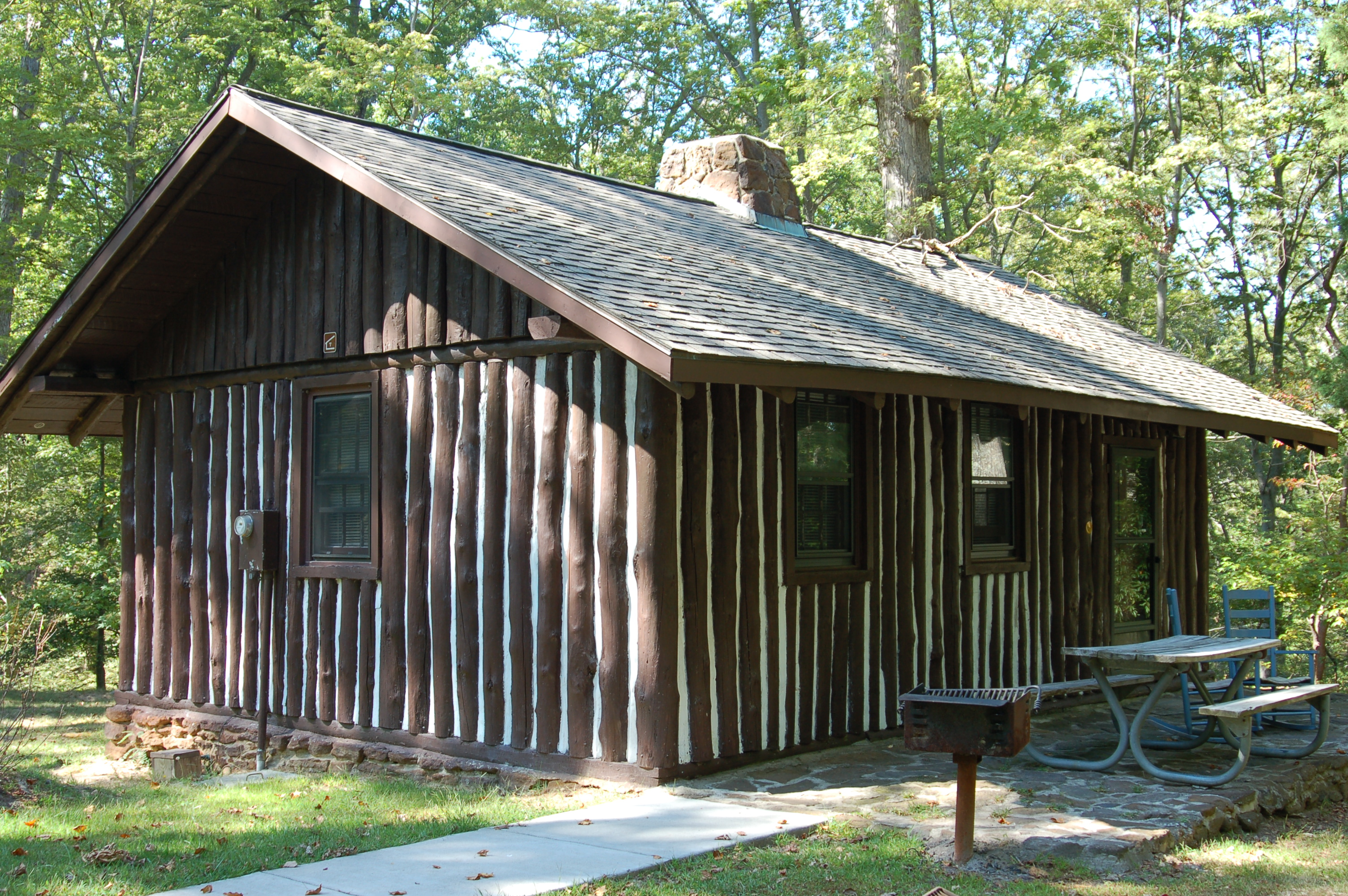
- Cabin 7, one of the original CCC-built cabins in the park

- Location within Virginia Location within the United States
- Nearest city: Montross, Virginia
- Area: 1,321 acres (535 ha)
- Built: 1933
- Architect: Meyers, E.L. Jr.; et al.
- Architectural style: Late 19th And Early 20th Century American Movements, Modern Movement
- NRHP reference No.: 05001265
- VLR No.: 096-0089

Significant dates
- Added to NRHP: November 16, 2005
- Designated VLR: June 1, 2005

Westmoreland State Park lies within Westmoreland County, Virginia. The park extends about one and a half miles along the Potomac River and covers 1,321 acres. The Horsehead Cliffs provide visitors with a panoramic view of the Potomac River, and lower levels feature fossils and beach access. The park offers hiking, camping, cabins, fishing, boating and swimming, although mechanical issues have kept the swimming pool closed since 2021. Located on the Northern Neck Peninsula, the park is close to historical sites featuring earlier eras: George Washington's birthplace and Stratford Hall, the birthplace of Robert E. Lee.

== History ==
Westmoreland State Park, the sixth of Virginia's six original state parks, opened in June 1936 after the Civilian Conservation Corps (CCC) constructed trails and amenities. Although some of the formerly unemployed workers were recruited in Virginia, most came from Pennsylvania and the Fort Dix, New Jersey recruiting office. Workers originally hand dug most of the roads and trails, and cabins were constructed from local timber and designed to reflect the area's pioneer heritage. Further land was acquired later in the century, and a gatehouse and swimming facilities built in the 1970s.

The Tayloe and Helen Murphy Hall is a conference center recently renovated from a CCC-built restaurant that opened in 1936. It features exposed wood beams, wrought iron hardware and a large fireplace. The renovated hall still includes a restaurant, and now hosts meetings, special events and educational programs. Both former legislator W. Tayloe Murphy Jr. (multi-term delegate representing Westmoreland County and Virginia's first Secretary of Natural Resources), and his wife, Helen, were born and raised in Westmoreland County.

Westmoreland State Park was listed on the National Register of Historic Places in 2005, as a national historic district based on its development of the state park system. The property includes 32 contributing buildings, 6 contributing sites, and 16 contributing structures.

== Attractions ==
- Camping
- Cabins
- Hiking trails – 7 trails covering 6 miles

The park's popular "Beach Trail" leads from the Visitor Center to the shore of the Potomac, below the Horsehead Cliffs. Embedded in these cliffs are fossil remains of porpoises, whales, and sharks from as long as 15 million years ago. Erosion over time exposes these remains and hunting for shark's teeth is a popular activity for visitors.

- Pool
- Beach area – on the Potomac River
- Fishing
- Boating – ramp available
- History and Nature Programs
- Gift Shop
- Visitor Center

== Lodging ==
Westmoreland State Park has 26 cabins available for renting. These range from one-room efficiency log cabins to two-bedroom log or cinderblock cabins.

The park has 133 camping sites available for tents or recreational vehicles.

== See also ==
- List of Virginia state parks
- List of Virginia state forests
