= Oldhams, Virginia =

Unincorporated community in Virginia, US

Coordinates: 38°00′09″N 76°40′08″W

Oldhams is an unincorporated community in Westmoreland County, in the U. S. state of Virginia.
