= Sandy Point, Northumberland County, Virginia =

Unincorporated community in Virginia, US

Coordinates: 37°49′12″N 76°18′28″W

Sandy Point is an unincorporated community in Northumberland County, in the U.S. state of Virginia.
