= Little Falls, Virginia =

Unincorporated community in Virginia, US

Coordinates: 38°16′22″N 77°25′14″W

Little Falls is an unincorporated community in Stafford County, in the U.S. state of Virginia.
