= Sandy Point State Forest =

State forest in Virginia, United States

- IUCN category VI (protected area with sustainable use of natural resources)
- Location within Virginia
- Location: King William County, Virginia
- Nearest town: King William
- Coordinates: 37°40′13.3″N 76°56′48.3″W
- Area: 2,043 acres (8.27 km^{2})
- Established: 2002
- Governing body: Virginia Department of Forestry

Sandy Point State Forest is a state forest located in King William County, Virginia, 2,043 acres (8.27 km^{2}) in size. The forest is characterized by its concentration of water-based resources. Recreational activities are allowed on the property, as well as hunting and fishing.
