= Dixie, Mathews County, Virginia =

Unincorporated community in Virginia, US

Coordinates: 37°30′02″N 76°24′52″W

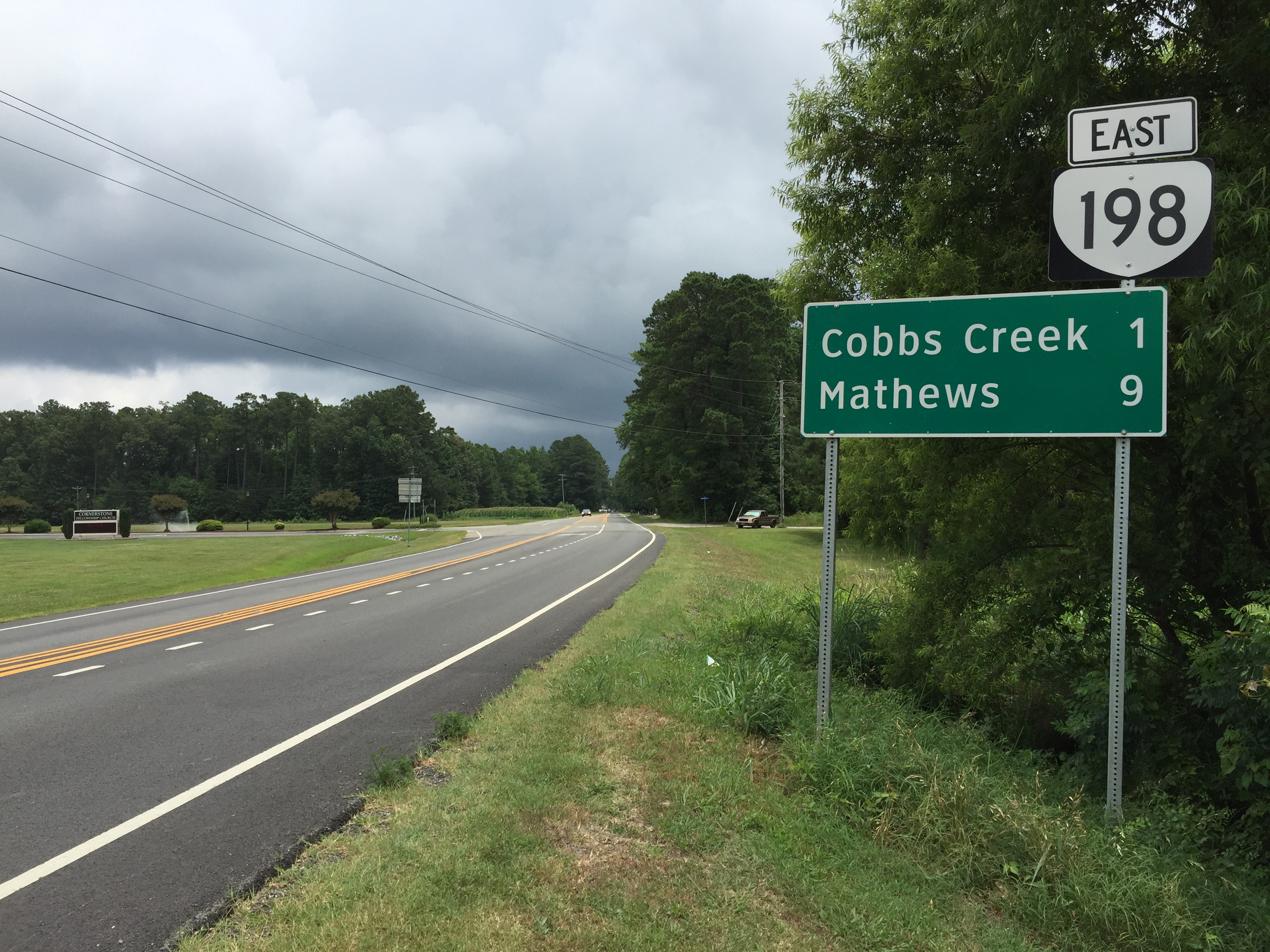
View east along Virginia State Route 198 (Buckley Hall Road) at Virginia State Route 3 (Twiggs Ferry Road) in Dixie, Mathews County, Virginia

Dixie, Mathews County is an unincorporated community in Mathews County, in the Commonwealth of Virginia, United States.
