= Templeman, Virginia =

Unincorporated community

Coordinates: 38°04′14″N 76°46′30″W

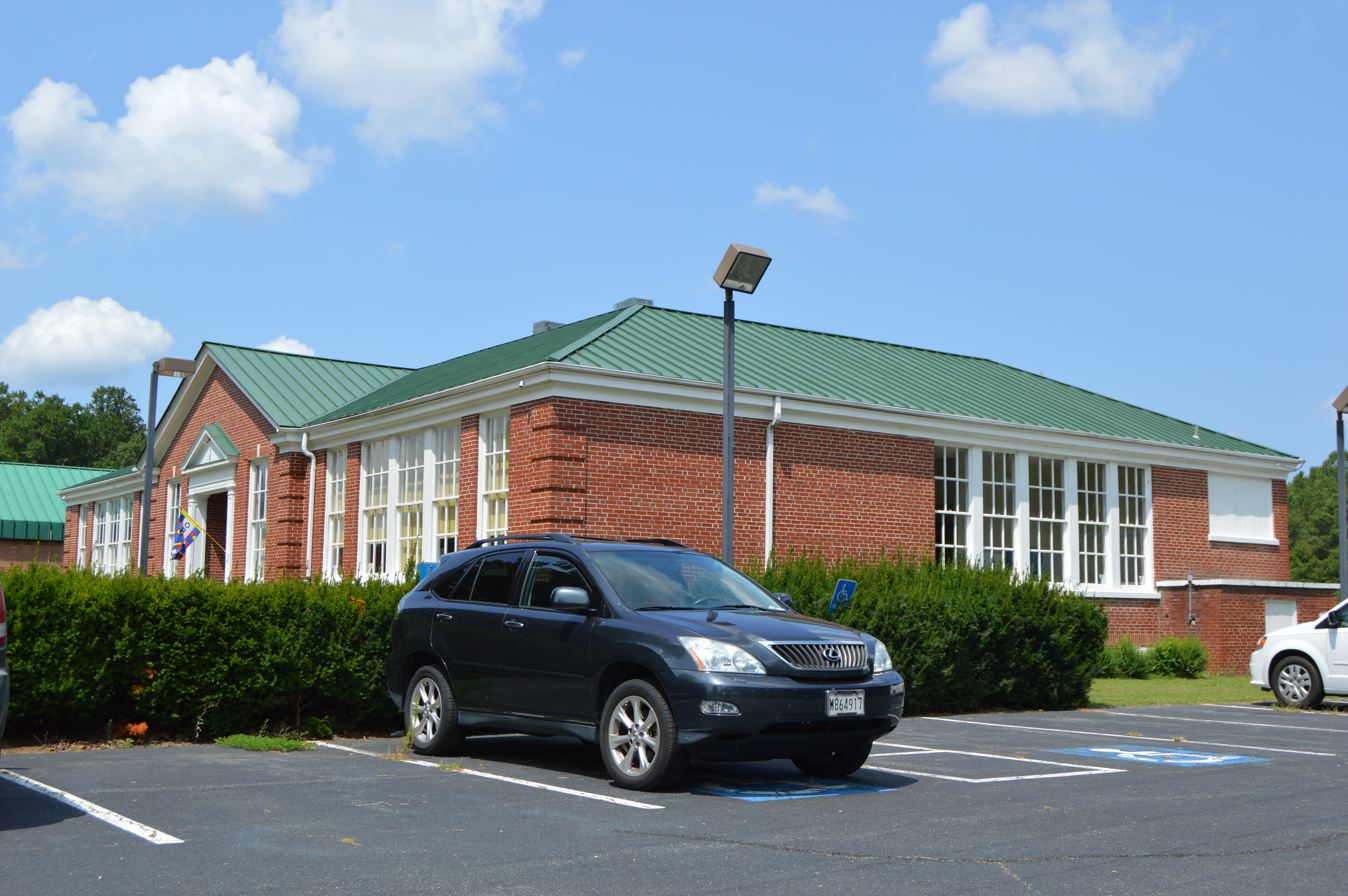
Armstead T. Johnson High School

Templeman (sometimes known as Templeman Crossroads) is an unincorporated community in Westmoreland County, in the U. S. state of Virginia.
