= Lyells, Virginia =

Unincorporated community in Virginia, US

Coordinates: 37°59′49″N 76°43′44″W

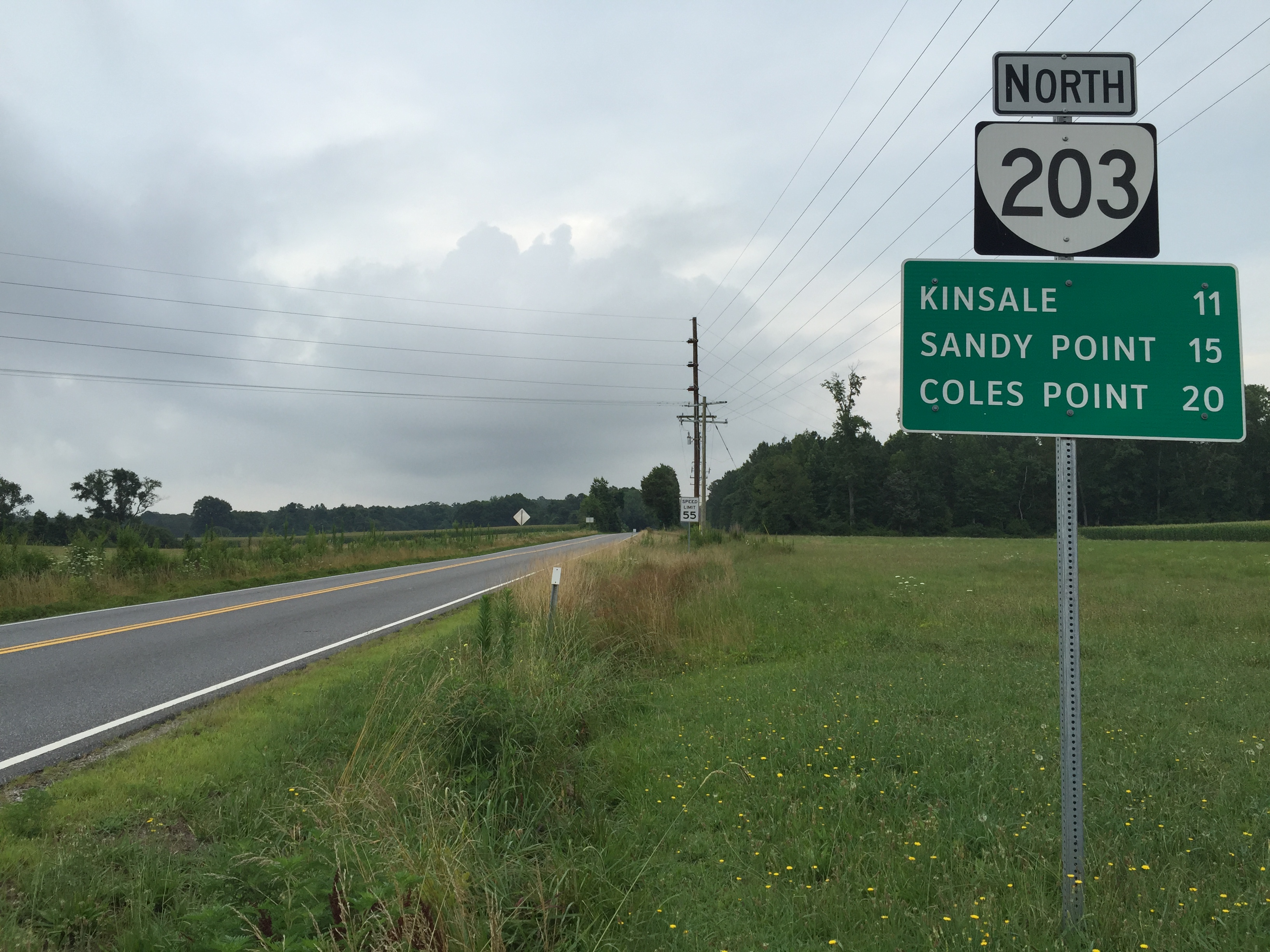
View north along Virginia State Route 203 (Oldhams Road) at Virginia State Route 3 (Kings Highway-History Land Highway) in Lyells.

Lyells is an unincorporated community in Richmond County, in the U.S. state of Virginia.

== Landmarks ==
The Rochester House was listed on the National Register of Historic Places in 1991. The community also contains Beulah Baptist Church.
