= Callao, Virginia =

Unincorporated community in Virginia, United States

Callao
- Unincorporated community
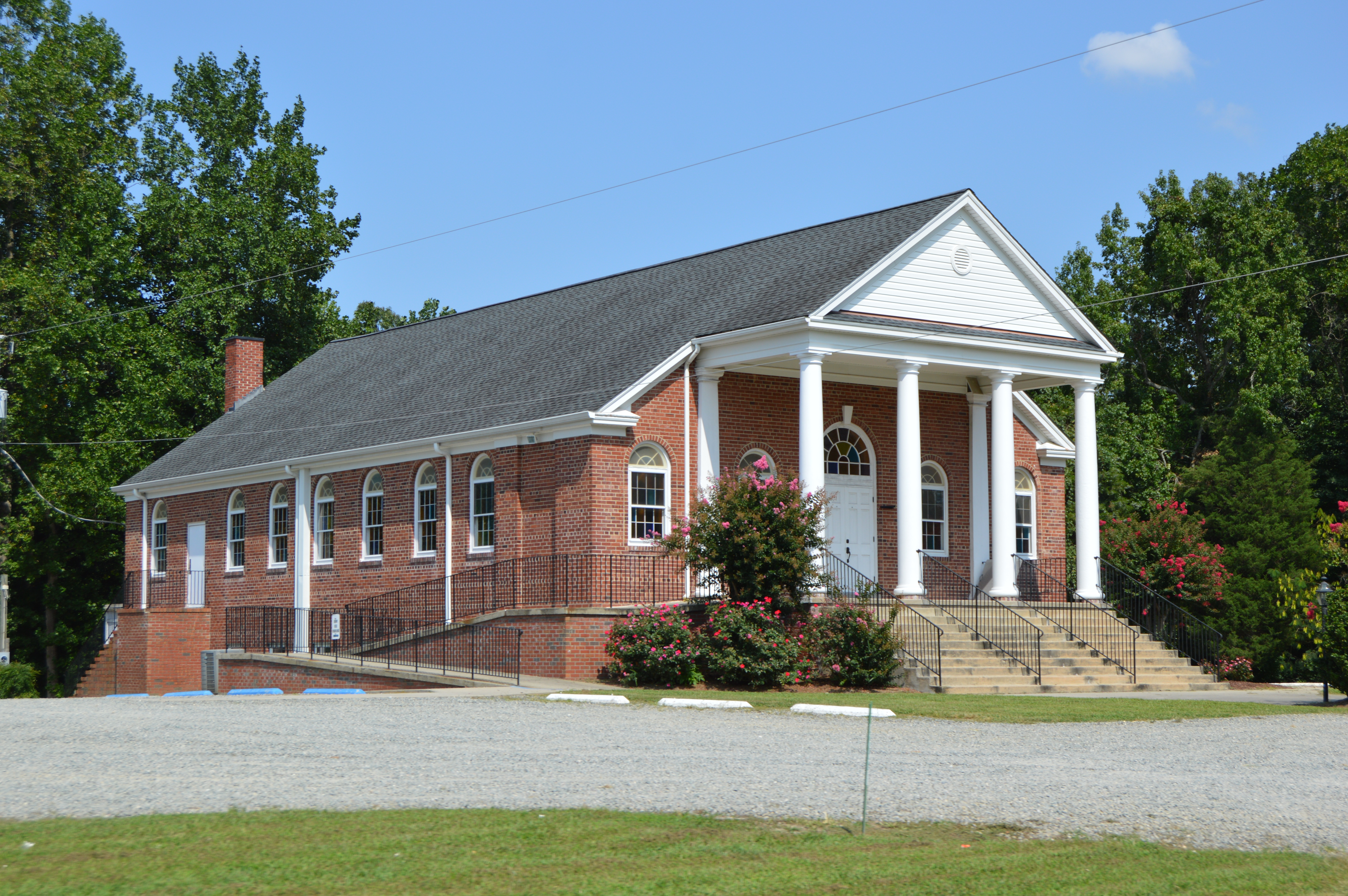
- Baptist church

- Location within the Commonwealth of Virginia Callao (the United States)
- Coordinates: 37°58′09″N 76°33′35″W
- Country: United States
- State: Virginia
- County: Northumberland
- Time zone: UTC−5 (Eastern (EST))
  - Summer (DST): UTC−4 (EDT)
- GNIS feature ID: 1464259

Callao is an unincorporated community in Northumberland County, Virginia, United States. It is located on U.S. Route 360 (the Northumberland Highway) northwest of Heathsville and east of Warsaw.

The name of the town was derived from the name of the first Postmaster, Jacob Callaway, in 1893. Callaway wanted the post office named after himself. However, there was already a town named Callaway in Virginia, so he dropped the "way" and added the "o".

Wheatland was listed on the National Register of Historic Places in 1988.
