= Sandy Point, Westmoreland County, Virginia =

Sandy Point
- Unincorporated community
- Location within the Commonwealth of Virginia Sandy Point (the United States)
- Coordinates: 38°4′3″N 76°32′11″W
- Country: United States
- State: Virginia
- County: Westmoreland
- Time zone: UTC−5 (Eastern (EST))
  - Summer (DST): UTC−4 (EDT)
- GNIS feature ID: 1496184

Sandy Point is a location in Westmoreland County, in the U. S. state of Virginia. Mary Ball Washington lived there as a child.
