= National Register of Historic Places listings in Westmoreland County, Virginia =

Location of Westmoreland County in Virginia

This is a list of the National Register of Historic Places listings in Westmoreland County, Virginia.

This is intended to be a complete list of the properties and districts on the National Register of Historic Places in Westmoreland County, Virginia, United States. The locations of National Register properties and districts for which the latitude and longitude coordinates are included below, may be seen in an online map.

There are 26 properties and districts listed on the National Register in the county, including 2 National Historic Landmarks.

This National Park Service list is complete through NPS recent listings posted August 14, 2026.

== Current listings ==
	Name on the Register	Image	Date listed	Location	City or town	Description
1	Bell House	Bell House	September 21, 1987 (#87000692)	821 Irving Ave. 38°14′27″N 76°57′27″W	Colonial Beach	
2	Blenheim	Blenheim	June 5, 1975 (#75002042)	North of Wakefield Corner off State Route 204; 38°10′51″N 76°56′56″W	Wakefield Corner	
3	Bushfield	Bushfield	February 11, 2004 (#04000053)	367 Club House Loop; 38°08′00″N 76°42′50″W	Mount Holly	
4	Chantilly	Chantilly	December 16, 1971 (#71000990)	Address Restricted	Montross	
5	Colonial Beach Commercial Historic District		September 16, 2021 (#100006984)	Colonia Ave from Lynnhaven Ave to Potomac R.; Washington Ave. from Boundary St., Irving Ave., Wilder Ave, and Hawthorn St.; and Boundary Ave to Beach Terrace from Hawthorn St. with exclusions. 38°15′17″N 76°57′49″W	Colonial Beach	
6	Ingleside	Ingleside	March 15, 1979 (#79003094)	South of Oak Grove on Leedstown Rd. 38°09′01″N 77°00′14″W	Oak Grove	
7	Armstead T. Johnson High School	Armstead T. Johnson High School	August 14, 1998 (#98001071)	0.2 miles northwest of the junction of State Routes 3 and 202; 38°04′39″N 76°46′54″W	Montross	
8	Morgan Jones 1677 Pottery Kiln	Morgan Jones 1677 Pottery Kiln	October 16, 1974 (#74002150)	Southwestern section of the Glebe Harbor subdivision peninsula 38°08′01″N 76°39′13″W	Hague	
9	Kinsale Historic District	Kinsale Historic District	July 22, 2005 (#05000476)	Roughly along Kinsale Rd., Kinsale Bridge Rd., Sigouney Dr., Great House Rd., and Yeocomico Ln. 38°01′46″N 76°34′48″W	Kinsale	
10	Kirnan - China Hall		August 5, 2019 (#100004257)	498 Zion Church Road; 38°03′49″N 76°37′19″W	Hague	
11	James Monroe Family Home Site	James Monroe Family Home Site	July 24, 1979 (#79003095)	4460 State Route 205; 38°14′31″N 76°59′25″W	Colonial Beach	Specific location represents a boundary increase of April 10, 2008; the site was originally listed as "Address Restricted"
12	Montross Historic District	Montross Historic District	September 22, 2023 (#100009072)	Bounded by VA 3/Kings Hwy., Alma and Ames Lns., Court Sq., Polk St., and Rectory Rd. 38°05′43″N 76°49′39″W	Montross	
13	Mount Pleasant	Mount Pleasant	November 27, 2002 (#02001440)	317 Coles Point Rd. 38°04′32″N 76°38′41″W	Hague	
14	Panorama	Panorama	January 31, 2011 (#10001186)	1006 Panorama Rd. 38°06′09″N 76°50′33″W	Montross	
15	Rochester House	Rochester House	January 25, 1991 (#90002205)	Beulah Ln., 1 mile (1.6 km) northeast of Lyells off State Route 3; 38°00′05″N 76°43′02″W	Lyells	
16	Roxbury	Roxbury	March 15, 1979 (#79003096)	1.7 miles (2.7 km) south of Oak Grove; 38°09′27″N 77°00′10″W	Oak Grove	
17	St. Peter's Episcopal Church	St. Peter's Episcopal Church	January 16, 2004 (#03001445)	Junction of State Routes 3 and 205; 38°10′56″N 76°59′45″W	Oak Grove	
18	Siele (motor yacht)	Siele (motor yacht)	November 12, 1998 (#98001310)	Colonial Beach Yacht Center; 38°13′56″N 76°57′56″W	Colonial Beach	
19	Spence's Point	Spence's Point	November 11, 1971 (#71000991)	On Sandy Point Neck, on Spences Point Rd. 38°05′13″N 76°33′46″W	Westmoreland	
20	Spring Grove	Spring Grove	October 10, 1985 (#85003130)	State Route 202; 38°05′10″N 76°42′22″W	Mount Holly	
21	Stratford Hall	Stratford Hall	October 15, 1966 (#66000851)	North of Lerty on State Route 214; 38°09′07″N 76°50′22″W	Lerty	
22	George Washington Birthplace National Monument	George Washington Birthplace National Monument	October 15, 1966 (#66000850)	East of Fredericksburg off U.S. Route 301 and State Route 3; 38°11′09″N 76°55′05″W	Colonial Beach	
23	Westmoreland State Park Historic District	Westmoreland State Park Historic District	November 16, 2005 (#05001265)	1650 State Park Rd. 38°10′12″N 76°51′46″W	Montross	
24	Wirtland	Wirtland	March 15, 1979 (#79003097)	South of Oak Grove on Leedstown Rd. 38°09′23″N 77°00′28″W	Oak Grove	
25	Woodbourne		March 10, 2025 (#100011145)	10908 Cople Highway; 38°02′51″N 76°37′31″W	Kinsale	
26	Yeocomico Church	Yeocomico Church	November 12, 1969 (#69000331)	Old Yeocomico Rd. 38°03′45″N 76°35′49″W	Tucker Hill	

== See also ==
- List of National Historic Landmarks in Virginia
- National Register of Historic Places listings in Virginia
