= John Poyntz Tyler =

American bishop

The Right Reverend John Poyntz Tyler D.D.
- Bishop of North Dakota
- Church: Episcopal Church
- Diocese: North Dakota
- Elected: October 23, 1913
- In office: 1914–1931
- Predecessor: Cameron Mann
- Successor: Frederick B. Bartlett

Orders
- Ordination: 1889
- Consecration: January 6, 1914 by Daniel S. Tuttle

Personal details
- Born: June 15, 1862 Westmoreland County, Virginia, United States
- Died: June 27, 1931 (aged 69) Fargo, North Dakota, United States
- Buried: Yeocomico Church
- Denomination: Anglican
- Parents: Wat Henry Tyler & Jane Louisa Blake
- Spouse: Ada A. Roderick (m. 1890)
- Children: 6
- Education: Virginia Theological Seminary

John Poyntz Tyler (June 15, 1862 – June 27, 1931), described "as a great preacher and pastor to people" was the fourth Episcopal Bishop of North Dakota and served from 1914 until weeks before his death.

== Early and family life ==
Born to privilege on Virginia's Northern Neck in Westmoreland County, Virginia, John Poyntz Tyler was the son of Jane T. (Blake) Tyler and Dr. Wat H. Tyler, M.D. Dr. Tyler was the nephew of President John Tyler; the Tylers were among the First Families of Virginia. John Poyntz Tyler was raised in historic Cople Parish, as was John Brockenbrough Newton, who likewise became an Episcopal bishop but stayed in Virginia.

Tyler graduated from the Virginia Theological Seminary in 1888, and later received an honorary Doctorate of Divinity degree (1914). He married Ada Rodrick in 1890 and they had six children: Mary, Jane, Blake, Ada Rodrick, Wat Henry, and John Poyntz (author Poyntz Tyler).

== Ministry ==
After being ordained a deacon at Prince Edward Parish Church, Tyler was assigned to historic Westover Church, Charles City, a position he held until 1891 (having been ordained as priest in 1889). In 1891, Tyler became rector at Christ Church, Millwood which had been built in the 1840s to serve the growing congregation of the historic Old Chapel (established in 1702 as the first Episcopal house of worship west of the Blue Ridge and home parish of Virginia's third bishop, William Meade), where he served until 1895. Somehow, Tyler also managed to coordinate the renovation of the most historic church in his original home Cople Parish (founded 1664), Yeocomico Church (still the fourth oldest complete church in the state). Cople parish also included historic Nomini Church (established 1653, and by then rarely used, as well as St. James' Church at Tidwells on the Potomac River as well as a chapel and rectory in Hague.).

Tyler next served as rector of St. Paul's Church at Greenville, Ohio for 1895-96 and in 1896-1904 held the same position at the Church of the Advent, Philadelphia. In 1904, Tyler returned to Virginia, accepting an appointment as Archdeacon of Virginia, based in Richmond. In 1907, he returned to the Appalachian region, accepting a position as rector of Saint John's Church in Hagerstown, Maryland, with the title Archdeacon of Cumberland, where he served until January 6, 1914, when he was consecrated missionary Bishop of North Dakota. In the interim, Tyler declined offered positions as Archdeacon of Alabama and of Southern Virginia.

== Missionary Bishop of North Dakota ==
North Dakota's bishop had died in office without having arranged for a successor. Tyler had grown up in a farming area and had worked as a missionary in isolated farming communities in the Blue Ridge and Appalachians. He was consecrated by Presiding Bishop Daniel S. Tuttle, as well as George William Peterkin of West Virginia and Alfred Magill Randolph of the Diocese of Southern Virginia. Arriving in Fargo, North Dakota during the winter of 1913–1914, Bishop Tyler began expanding what had been a fledgling congregation. In 1919 the Episcopal General Convention began a national fund, which increased grants to missionary districts such as North Dakota, which qualified for funding during 1920–21. Episcopalians thus began to match the missionary efforts of the Presbyterians, Methodists, and Congregationalists. Despite the national funding, the diocese struggled because a series of droughts produced a severe agricultural depression. Farm prices stayed depressed as the cost of manufactured products rose. Bankruptcies and bank failures increased. The number of North Dakotan Episcopal institutions remained modest due to the lack of money and leadership. However, despite the economic hardship, Bishop Tyler founded several institutions. In Valley City, North Dakota, a home for young women attending Normal School was opened in Church Hall. Pelican Lake property was purchased in western Minnesota to serve as the Samuel C. Edsall Holiday House (a camp, retreat and conference center). Bishop Tyler also supported The Girl's Friendly Society, which grew to 20 societies totaling 200 communicants by 1924. As well, Tyler reduced the indebtedness of the Diocese. As was said after his death, "[s]ome part of the tenacity of the churches in this large sea of Lutherans and Catholics can be credited to Bishop Tyler's success in instilling in members a sense of their worth and mission."

== Death ==
On July 13, 1931, Bishop Tyler retired from active service to the Diocese. He died at Fargo of heart disease two weeks later on July 27, 1931.

== See also ==
- Historical list of bishops of the Episcopal Church in the United States of America

Episcopal Church (USA) titles
Preceded by Cameron Mann	4th Bishop of North Dakota; 1913 – 1931	Succeeded by Frederick B. Bartlett
