= John Campbell (Westmoreland politician) =

Virginia planter and politician)

Member of the Virginia Senate for Westmoreland, Stafford and King George Counties
- In office December 4, 1809 – 1816
- Preceded by: John P. Hungerford
- Succeeded by: John Hooe

Member of the Virginia House of Delegates for Westmoreland County
- In office December 5, 1803 – November 30, 1806 Serving with Stephen Bailey
- Preceded by: George Garner
- Succeeded by: Baldwin M. Lee

Personal details
- Born: 1774 King George County, Colony of Virginia
- Died: 1827 (aged 52–53) Westmoreland County, Virginia
- Spouse: Elizabeth Fergusen Murphy
- Parent(s): Rev.Archibald M. Campbell, Hannah McCoy
- Occupation: planter, lawyer, judge, politician

John Campbell (1774–1827) was a Virginia planter, lawyer and judge who as a politician represented Westmoreland County in both houses of the Virginia General Assembly. His former home near Hague which he renamed "Kirnan" after his family's ancestral estate in Scotland, was admitted to the National Register of Historic Places in 2019.

== Early life and education ==
His father, Rev. Archibald MacIver Campbell, had emigrated from Scotland and served as rector of Washington Parish in Westmoreland County on Virginia's Northern Neck. During his tenure as rector this parish had two churches: one at Round Hill near Maple Grove, across Rosier Creek from Potomac Beach (the site is now in King George County), and one near Popes Creek. (These churches were superseded by St. Peters near Oak Grove in the 1840s.) Rev. Campbell's first wife had died giving birth to their only child, who also did not survive; their gravestone is now the only marker of the former Round Hill church. Rev. Campbell remarried to Hannah McCoy, daughter of the rector of North Farnham parish and whose mother descended from the prominent Fitzhugh family. This marriage produced two brothers, Archibald and Alexander Campbell, prior to the birth of John, who was baptised by his father shortly before Rev. Campbell's death. The sons of his eldest brother Archibald, Frederick and Ferdinand, successively inherited a title and lands in Scotland, but as a condition of that inheritance changed their surname to Stewart. His brother Alexander Campbell also became a prominent lawyer, whose only daughter Mary eventually married future Supreme Court justice James M. Wayne.

== Career ==
After reading law, Campbell began a legal practice in the Northern Neck of Virginia, including serving at least some of the time as Commonwealth's attorney (prosecutor).

Like his father and both grandfathers, John Campbell was also a planter who farmed using enslaved labor. In the 1810 census, John Campbell owned 36 slaves in Westmoreland County. A decade later, Campbell owned 11 slaves in Westmoreland County.

Westmoreland County voters first elected Campbell as one of their representatives in the Virginia House of Delegates in 1803, and he won re-election twice, serving several terms alongside veteran Stephen Bailey until 1806, when Baldwin Lee succeeded him. Campbell succeeded Revolutionary War veteran George Garner (d.1809), who was also a local justice of the peace and whose family estate (then called "China Hall") Campbell would purchase in 1822 and make his home. After John Hungerford won election to the U.S. House of Representatives, Campbell ran for Hungerford's former seat in the Virginia Senate, and won re-election, thus representing Westmoreland and adjacent King George and Stafford counties until 1817, when John Hooe of King George county succeeded to the seat. Virginia legislators elected Campbell as a judge, and he adjudicated cases in the Northern Neck area until his death.

A cradle Episcopalian, Campbell was also active in his church, despite its decline following its disestablishment by the Virginia General Assembly and ratification of that law by Virginia's highest court (then known as the Court of Appeals). After Campbell bought Kirnan in 1822, he was active in Cople parish. Although health problems of Virginia's bishop James Madison (also president of the College of William and Mary) had complicated Virginia Episcopalians' involvement in the national Episcopal Church, Campbell and Washington parish's rector attended the 1822 General Convention of the Episcopal Church.

== Personal life ==
Campbell married twice. His first wife gave birth to one daughter before her death. On December 7, 1808, Campbell married Eliza Fergusen Murphy, who survived her husband by more than a decade. They had at least one son (another Archibald Campbell) and at least 5 daughters before his death.

== Death and legacy ==
In 1814 Campbell wrote a will in Philadelphia, Pennsylvania (where his nephew Frederick lived), in which Campbell named his nephew Ferdinand as a guardian for his son Archibald should that become necessary because of a dangerous voyage he was then undertaking. Westmoreland County, Virginia later admitted that will to probate. The will acknowledged his second wife's dower interest, as well as made various bequests to his daughters and grandchildren, released debts of his brother and another man, then bequeathed most of his property (including slaves) to his son Archibald. Campbell died in 1827, and his widow remained at the house he had renamed Kirnan until her death in 1839. Several years later Campbell's five daughters (as surviving heirs) sold the property, which remained in the hands of the Bowie and Taylor families until 2011, when it was purchased and restored by a lawyer and tech executive, who also secured its placement on the National Register of Historic Places in 2019.
