= Raid on Kinsale =

British naval attack on the United States during the War of 1812

- Part of the War of 1812
Date	August 3, 1814
Location	Kinsale, Virginia and Mundy's Point, Virginia 38.0293°N 76.5810°W
Result	British victory

Belligerents
United Kingdom	United States

Commanders and leaders
George Cockburn; James Scott	William Henderson

Strength
500 marines and sailors including 120 Colonial Marines	Unknown number of Virginia militia

Casualties and losses
At least 1 killed	8 killed

On August 3, 1814, a British force of approximately 500 marines and sailors, including 120 Colonial Marines, launched a two-phase raid along the Yeocomico River in Virginia's Northern Neck, first landing at Mundy's Point and then advancing upriver to the village of Kinsale.

== Background ==
By the summer of 1814, Rear Admiral George Cockburn had been conducting an extensive campaign of raids along the Chesapeake Bay and its tributaries. In mid-July, Cockburn turned his attention to Virginia's Northern Neck, burning Nomini Church.

== Landing at Mundy's Point ==
At 2 a.m. on August 3, Cockburn personally led a force of 500 sailors and Royal Marines up the Yeocomico River in 20 barges. A Virginia militia force of 40 Northumberland County militiamen under Captain William Henderson was waiting at Mundy's Point. The Americans opened fire, killing at least one marine, but were soon routed by the raiders. British troops subsequently pillaged and burned 16 surrounding homes, including that of Captain Henderson, and were joined by many escaped slaves.

== Landing at Kinsale ==
Learning that the Virginia militia was regrouping at the nearby village of Kinsale, Cockburn returned his force to their boats and sailed upriver. At Kinsale, the raiders were confronted by a large militia force occupying a ridge. The Colonial Marines led a charge against the ridge, routing the Americans and killing at least eight militiamen. The village was immediately set ablaze, along with three old schooners, while the raiders' plunder was taken away on five captured ships.

== Aftermath ==
By mid-August, Virginia's Northern Neck had been "devastated" by British raids. British troops' success in suppressing American resistance in the Patuxent and Potomac Valleys, combined with the arrival of thousands of reinforcements from Europe, emboldened British commanders to pursue more aggressive offensives against Washington and Baltimore shortly after. The Colonial Marines' key role in the assaults at Kinsale and Mundy's Point demonstrated Black troops' value to the British war effort in the region, providing Cochrane's force with exceptional "local knowledge and combat performance" in the Chesapeake in the spring and summer of 1814.

== Bibliography ==
- "Richmond, August 8. Movement of the Enemy". Alexandria Gazette. Vol. XIV, no. 4202. Alexandria, Virginia. August 11, 1814. p. 3 – via Readex: America's Historical Newspapers.
- Neimeyer, Charles P. (2014). The Chesapeake Campaign 1813–1814. Washington, D.C.: Center of Military History, United States Army.
- Taylor, Alan (2013). The Internal Enemy: Slavery and War in Virginia, 1772–1832. New York: W. W. Norton.
- Vogel, Steve (July 3, 2013). "Excerpt: Through the Perilous Fight". NPR.
