= Hinnom, Virginia =

Unincorporated community in Virginia, US

Coordinates: 38°06′37″N 76°44′13″W

Hinnom is an unincorporated community in Westmoreland County, in the Commonwealth (U.S. state) of Virginia. It lies approximately five miles from Montross, at the end of Zacata Road (Route 645), and consists of the region south of Nomini Bay and west of Nomini Creek. It no longer has a Post Office or a ferry landing.

The community was named after Hinnom in the Middle East.
