= Ingleside Vineyards =

Winery in Oak Grove, Virginia, US

- Ingleside
- U.S. National Register of Historic Places
- Virginia Landmarks Register
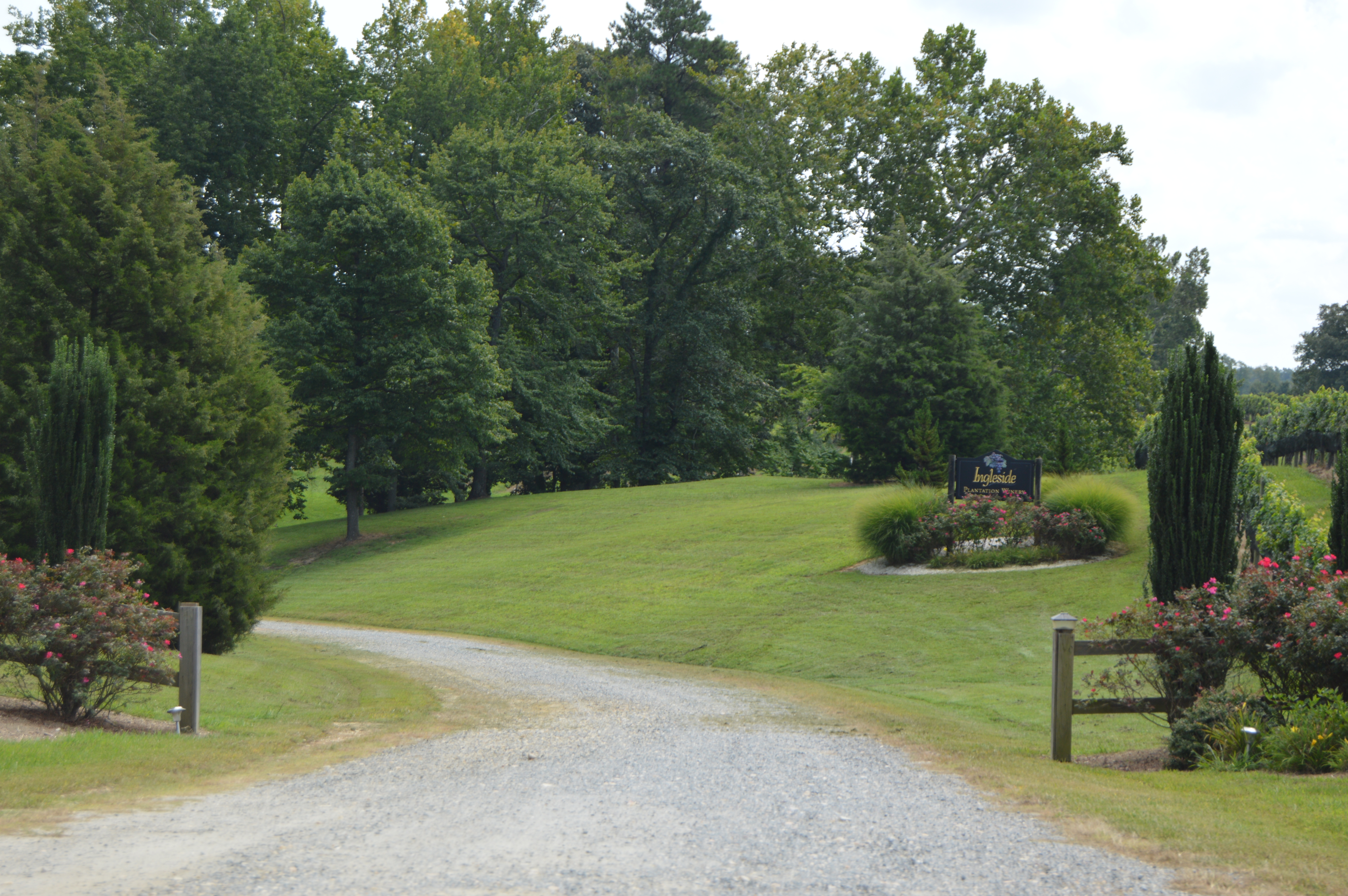
- Entrance

- Location within Virginia Location within the United States
- Location: South of Oak Grove on Leedstown Road, near Oak Grove, Virginia
- Coordinates: 38°08′57″N 77°00′18″W
- Area: 10 acres (4.0 ha)
- Built: 1834
- NRHP reference No.: 79003094
- VLR No.: 096-0012

Significant dates
- Added to NRHP: March 15, 1979
- Designated VLR: December 21, 1976

Ingleside Vineyards
- Appellation: Northern Neck George Washington Birthplace AVA
- Other labels: Chesapeake Wine Company
- Founded: 1890
- First vintage: 1980
- Key people: Bill Swain
- Distribution: Regional (VA, DC, MD, WV, DE)
- Tasting: Open to the public
- Website: inglesidevineyards.com

Ingleside Vineyards is a winery located in the Northern Neck George Washington Birthplace AVA, an American Viticultural Area located in the Northern Neck region of Virginia. Ingleside is one of the oldest and largest wineries in the state, established in 1980, and part of an estate of over 3,000 acres (12 km^{2}) owned by the Flemer family since 1890.

== History ==
The farmhouse, originally known as Washington Academy, was built in 1834, and is a two-story, five-bay, brick building with a pedimented hexastyle front portico. Flanking the two-story central block are one-story wings. The Washington Academy operated until about 1844, and the property sold in 1847.

It was listed on the National Register of Historic Places in 1979. The vineyard also owns two nearby Register-listed houses, Wirtland and Roxbury.

== Relationship with Mark Warner ==
Former Virginia governor and current United States Senator Mark Warner grows 15 acres (61,000 m^{2}) of grapes for Ingleside Vineyards at his farm in King George County. Ingleside bottles a private label which Warner offers at charity auctions.

== Wines ==
Among the wines that Ingleside Vineyards produces are varietal and blended bottlings of Sangiovese, Petit Verdot, Merlot, Cabernet Sauvignon, Cabernet Franc and Touriga Nacional.
