= Spence's Point =

Historic house in Virginia, United States

- Spence's Point (John Roderigo Dos Passos House)
- U.S. National Register of Historic Places
- U.S. National Historic Landmark
- Virginia Landmarks Register
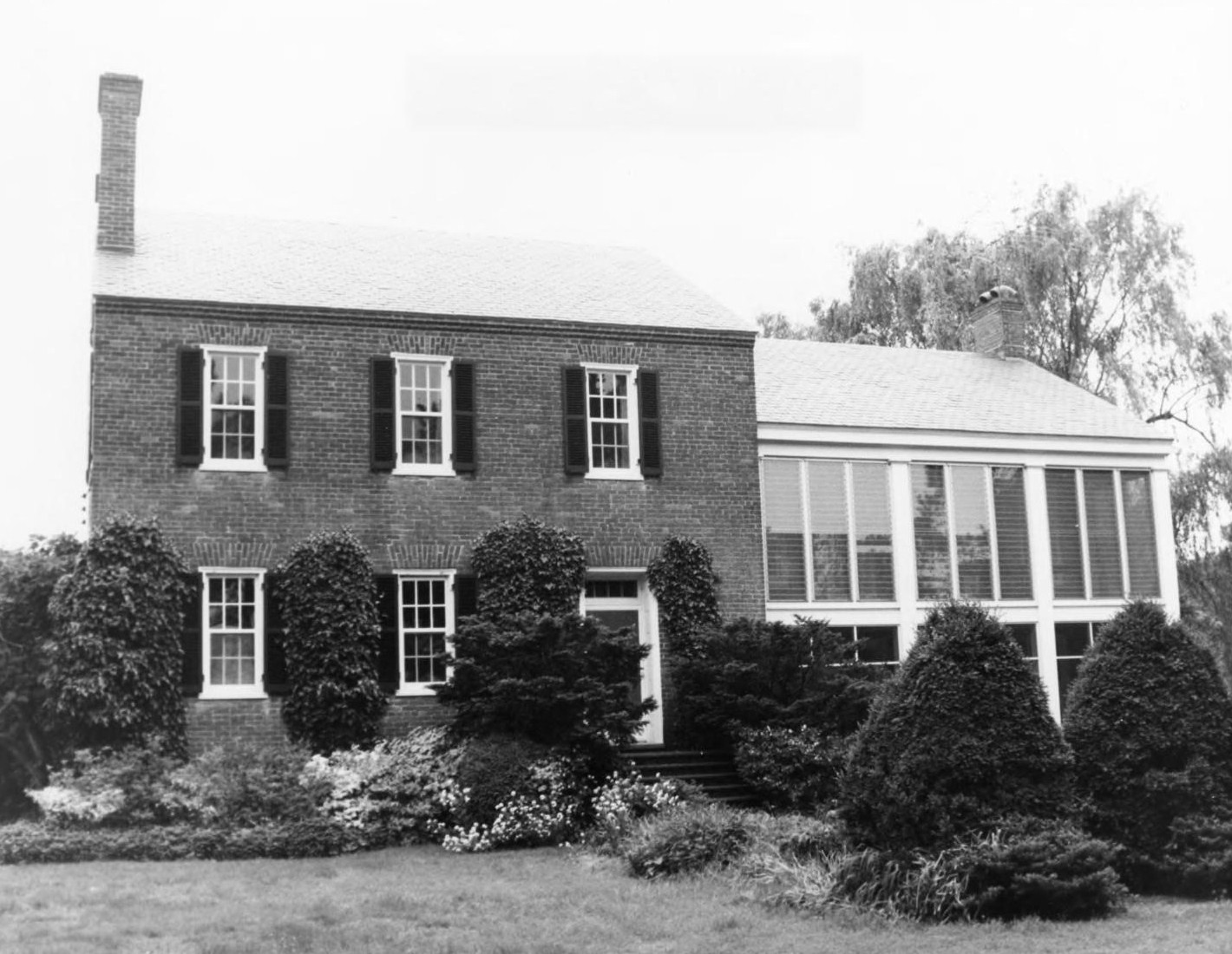
- Spence's Point in 1971

- Location within Virginia Location within the United States
- Location: On Sandy Point Neck, off VA 749, Westmoreland, Virginia
- Coordinates: 38°05′13″N 76°33′46″W
- Area: 1,800 acres (730 ha)
- Built: 1806; 1942
- Architectural style: Georgian
- NRHP reference No.: 71000991
- VLR No.: 096-0022

Significant dates
- Added to NRHP: November 11, 1971
- Designated NHL: November 11, 1971
- Designated VLR: February 20, 1973

Spence's Point is a historic estate on the Potomac River near Westmoreland, Virginia. Also known as the John R. Dos Passos Farm, it was the home of writer John Dos Passos (1896–1970) for the last 25 years of his life. It was declared a National Historic Landmark in 1971.

== Description and history ==
Spence's Point is located in rural southeastern Westmoreland County, on the north side of VA 749. Set on the south bank of the Potomac River down a long drive from the highway is the main house of the 1,800-acre (730 ha) estate. It is a modest 2 1/2-story brick building with a gabled roof and single end chimney. It is three bays wide, with the main entrance in the rightmost bay. The basic architecture is a simple interpretation of the Federal style. To the rear is a two-story addition, added in the 1940s by Dos Passos, with a two-story veranda overlooking the river. Further south, also overlooking the river in the village of Sandy Neck, is the site of the childhood home of Dos Passos; the house he grew up in has been demolished and replaced, but some of the outbuildings remain in place.

The land at Spence's Point was a large parcel that the father of John Dos Passos purchased in 1885, and the Sandy Neck house is where Dos Passos spent his childhood. In 1942, after he achieved prominence as one of the most influential writers of his generation, Dos Passos purchased a portion of the original property and restored the brick farmhouse that stood there which was originally built around 1806. It was then to remain his home until his death in 1970. Although he had written some of his most important works prior to the acquisition of this property, many of his later works were written here. At the time of its designation as a landmark in 1971, it was occupied by his widow.

== See also ==
- List of National Historic Landmarks in Virginia
- National Register of Historic Places listings in Westmoreland County, Virginia
