= Bevans Oyster Company =

American oyster aquaculture company

- Company type: Private
- Founded: October 1966; 58 years ago
- Founder: Ronald Bevans
- Headquarters: Kinsale, Virginia, U.S.
- Products: Oysters; Bait
- Website: www.bevansoyster.com

Bevans Oyster Company is an oyster farm and seafood aquaculture company headquartered in Westmoreland County, Virginia. The company has been described as one of the largest oyster companies in the State of Virginia.

== Background ==
The Bevans family established the company in October 1966, and it has remained a family business since its founding. The founder, Ronald "Ronnie" Bevans has been described as the "Chesapeake's Oyster King."

Bevans Oyster Company sells fresh-shucked Chesapeake oysters, half-shell oysters, canned oysters, and jarred oysters. It is an Interstate Certified Shellfish Shipper. Outside of selling a variety of oysters, the company also sells two Menhaden bait varieties. The company is a current supplier to Ukrop's Food Group and restaurants across the United States.

The company's oyster farms are located in the Yeocomico River, Potomac River, James River, Rappahannock River, and York River. In 2002, the company also helped to restore an oyster reef in the river. The company also operates a seafood cannery and packing facility and is a research partner with the State of Virginia. The packing and shucking facility also processes oysters from the Long Island Sound, Kent Narrows, and Rock Hall.

=== Works ===
- Best Management Practices for the Virginia Shellfish Culture Industry, 2008
