= St. Peter's Episcopal Church (Oak Grove, Virginia) =

Historic church in Virginia, US

- U.S. National Register of Historic Places
- Virginia Landmarks Register
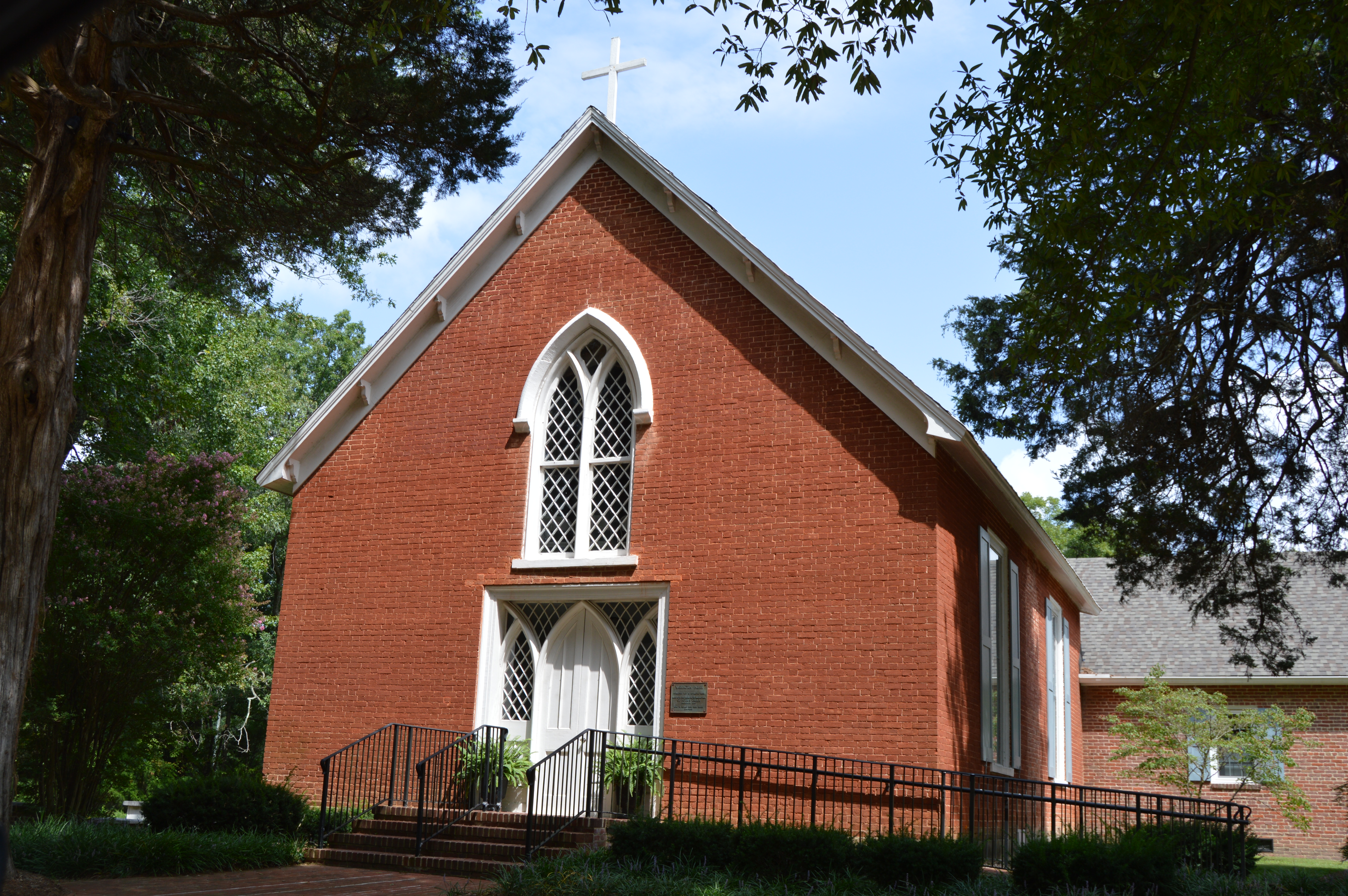
- Front of the church

- Location within Virginia Location within the United States
- Location: Jct. of VA 3 and VA 205, Oak Grove, Virginia
- Coordinates: 38°10′55″N 76°59′46″W
- Area: 2 acres (0.81 ha)
- Built: 1848-1849, 1860, 1882-1883
- Architect: Robert Cary Long, Jr., et al.
- Architectural style: Gothic Revival
- NRHP reference No.: 03001445
- VLR No.: 096-0045

Significant dates
- Added to NRHP: January 16, 2004
- Designated VLR: September 10, 2003

St. Peter's Episcopal Church is a historic Episcopal church located at the junction of VA 3 and VA 205 in historic Oak Grove, Westmoreland County, Virginia. Although the surrounding parish was created in the 17th century, the current brick structure, which was listed on the National Register of Historic Places in 2004, was consecrated in 1849, and planned to celebrate its 175th anniversary on May 31, 2024.

== History ==
Originally named Appomattocks parish for the Appomattoc native American tribe in the area, it was one of the three earliest parishes in what became Westmoreland County on Virginia's historic Northern Neck. The Northumberland County court in 1653 had given native American names to its parishes, including Nominy, Chickacone and Great Wicomico. When Westmoreland County was created from Northumberland County, Nominy parish was further split into Appomattocks and Potomac parishes. Potomac Parish would cover what became Stafford County in what was then western Westmoreland County, and Cople Parish would be created in 1665 from additional land gained from Northumberland County, some of which had been named Westbury parish for a short time.

In 1664 Appomattocks was renamed Washington Parish to honor early vestryman John Washington, the great-grandfather of President George Washington who reorganized the parish in 1661. Other prominent descendants of church founders include Richard Henry Lee and Francis Lightfoot Lee, both of whom signed the Declaration of Independence and were sons of Colonel Thomas Lee. Rev. Archibald Campbell served as rector from 1744 until his death in 1774, and also operated a school which educated many boys who later became prominent Patriots in the American Revolutionary War, including future President James Monroe (great, great-grandson of church founder Andrew Monroe) and John Marshall, the fourth Chief Justice of the United States Supreme Court (son of Colonel Thomas Marshall). In the early 19th century Rev. Campbell's youngest son John Campbell represented Westmoreland county in both houses of the Virginia Assembly as well as at church conventions and became a local judge, and his grand daughter Lucy married future Supreme Court justice James M. Wayne.

The current brick church building was built circa 1848 through the effort of the new rector, Rev. William McGuire, and parishioners William Wirt M.D. and John E. Wilson. At its 1849 consecration, it became the first reconstructed parish church in Westmoreland County since the disestablishment of the Episcopal Church, and Rev. McGuire would later found or rebuild several other parishes on the Northern Neck. Congregations had stopped using Washington parish's other churches at Leedstown and Pope's Creek by 1805, when church property was sold, and Old Pope's Creek Church burned down in 1828. In colonial times, Washington parish also included a church at Round Hill in what became King George county, which Rev. Campbell also served and which was decrepit by 1838.

Both Union and Confederate troops at various times occupied the church during the American Civil War, especially in its first two years in 1861 and 1862. Members of the Confederate units calling themselves the "Lancaster Greys" (9th South Carolina Infantry company A) and "Lee’s Light Horse" (9th Virginia Cavalry company C) carved graffiti, as did members of the 19th Indiana Infantry, and the 8th New York Cavalry. Other Civil War graffiti was painted over in the 1930s.

Fire severely damaged the historic church on December 19, 2023.

== Architecture ==
The existing brick sanctuary building was built in the Gothic Revival style, possibly by Baltimore architect Robert Cary Long Jr. (1810–1849). A vestry room, recept and single round Agnus Dei stained glass window were added in 1860. An exposed cross-beamed ceiling and higher and steeper roof, as well as additional double-stained glass windows were added in 1882–1883, when side-aisles were also removed in favor of a central aisle configuration.

An adjacent area includes several 18th and 19th century gravestones moved from other cemeteries during redevelopment of those properties, but no actual interments. Further major renovations occurred in 1957-1959 (including a parish hall), 1978-79 (HVAC system) and 1991 (Sunday school wing).
