= Poyntz Tyler =

American novelist

- Born: May 30, 1906; Ashland, Virginia, United States
- Died: March 23, 1971 (aged 64)

John Poyntz Tyler (May 30, 1906 – March 23, 1971) was an American writer. He wrote the 1960 novel A Garden of Cucumbers, which was the basis for the 1967 comedy film Fitzwilly. He was also the compiler-editor for the "Reference Shelf" book series in the 1950s and 1960s for the HW Wilson Company in New York City.

== Biography ==
Tyler was the son of Episcopal Bishop John Poyntz Tyler. He was born in Ashland, Virginia, and educated at the Agassiz School in Fargo, North Dakota (an area where his father was the Episcopal bishop), the Episcopal High School in Alexandria, Virginia, and the University of Virginia in Charlottesville. He was on the debate team in high school, known as the Blackford Literary Society. He worked for various magazines and newspapers, as well as for Westinghouse Electric Company, United Cerebral Palsy, and the U.S. Army. He claimed to be an honorary Sioux.
