= Fitzwilly =

1967 film by Delbert Mann

- film poster by Frank Frazetta
- Directed by: Delbert Mann
- Screenplay by: Isobel Lennart
- Based on: A Garden of Cucumbers; 1960 novel by Poyntz Tyler
- Produced by: Walter Mirisch
- Starring: Dick Van Dyke; Barbara Feldon; John McGiver; Edith Evans
- Cinematography: Joseph Biroc
- Edited by: Ralph Winters
- Music by: John Williams
- Production company: The Mirisch Corporation
- Distributed by: United Artists
- Release date: December 20, 1967
- Running time: 102 minutes
- Country: United States
- Language: English
- Box office: $2,100,000 (US/ Canada)

Fitzwilly is a 1967 American romantic comedy film directed by Delbert Mann, based on Poyntz Tyler's 1960 novel A Garden of Cucumbers (the title refers to Isaiah 1:8) and adapted for the screen by Isobel Lennart. Its title refers to the nickname of its protagonist, Claude Fitzwilliam, an unusually intelligent and highly educated mastermind of a butler played by Dick Van Dyke, who commits robberies to maintain the luxurious lifestyle of his employer. The film co-stars Barbara Feldon in her first feature-film role.

== Plot ==
Claude Fitzwilliam serves as butler to Miss Victoria Woodworth, an elderly heiress whose tremendous wealth is a myth fostered by Fitzwilliam; unbeknownst to her, her financier father actually left her $180. "Fitzwilly" has been leading the household staff on numerous thefts, raids and swindles — including the operation of the fictional charity and thrift shop, St. Dismas — to maintain "Miss Vicki" in the lifestyle to which she is accustomed.

The staff's secret operations threaten to unravel when Miss Vicki hires an assistant, Juliet Nowell, to assist with her creation of a dictionary that contains all possible phonetic misspellings of words. Juliet is surprised to learn from Miss Vicki that Fitzwilly graduated with honors from Williams College, and she opines that he should be doing something more "worthy" than being a butler, like joining the Peace Corps.

After Juliet inadvertently foils several minor operations, Fitzwilly becomes determined to get rid of her. He conceives a plan to court her in order to induce her to quit; this becomes complicated when they fall in love. Still unaware of Fitzwilly's secret life, Juliet does quit when Fitzwilly refuses to discuss ending his life in service.

Juliet stumbles upon evidence of Fitzwilly's past crimes, and returns to the mansion to confront him. Fitzwilly proposes marriage and agrees to end the criminal operations and tell Miss Vicki everything, but there is a problem: due to Juliet's past interference, the household is $75,000 short of funds, and they have to raise the money by Christmas Day. This leads to a complex setpiece in which the Woodworth staff orchestrates the robbery of Gimbels department store on Christmas Eve.

Although the operation is initially successful, one of the household, Albert, a former minister, allows himself to be caught to "atone" for his sins. He steadfastly refuses to implicate anyone else. Miss Woodworth casually blackmails the assistant district attorney ("the son of my oldest friend") into engineering a suspended sentence on a lesser charge, and blithely offers to write a counter check to the store to cover the amount of the take, money that she does not know she does not have as part of that supposed inheritance.

Believing that the entire household is destined for prison, Fitzwilly uncomfortably toasts his and Juliet's engagement with Juliet, her father and Miss Vicki. His discomfort is alleviated when it is revealed that Miss Vicki's dictionary has been rewritten as a screenplay, and sold to a Hollywood studio for $500,000.

== Cast ==
- Dick Van Dyke as Claude Fitzwilliam
- Barbara Feldon as Juliet Nowell
- John McGiver as Albert
- Dame Edith Evans as Miss Victoria Woodworth
- Harry Townes as Mr. Nowell
- John Fiedler as Mr. Morton Dunne
- Anne Seymour as Grimsby
- Norman Fell as Oberblat
- Cecil Kellaway as Buckmaster
- Stephen Strimpell as Byron Casey
- Helen Kleeb as Mrs. Mortimer
- Paul Reed as Prettikin
- Albert Carrier as Pierre
- Nelson Olmsted as Simmons
- Dennis Cooney as Assistant D.A. Elliot Adams
- Noam Pitlik as Charles
- Anthony Eustrel as Garland
- Sam Waterston as Oliver
- Billy Halop as Restaurant owner (uncredited)

== Soundtrack ==
The film features an early symphonic score by John Williams, credited both on the album and on screen as "Johnny Williams". Notably the score includes "Make Me Rainbows", the film's love theme and end credits song and Williams' first collaboration with co-writers Alan and Marilyn Bergman.

The score was released commercially at the time by United Artists (and re-issued in 1980 by MCA Records), and was referred to as the film's "original motion picture score" and not as the "original motion picture soundtrack recording" because instead of performances that had actually been heard in the film Williams opted to release arrangements designed for separate listening. In 2004 a limited edition compact disc was released by Varèse Sarabande's CD Club which paired the scores of Fitzwilly and Robert Altman's 1973 film The Long Goodbye, another Williams credit.

The soundtrack, including the re-recording album and the original complete soundtrack, was released on the Music Box Records label.

== See also ==
- List of Christmas films
