= Oak Grove, Westmoreland County, Virginia =

Unincorporated community in Virginia, US

Coordinates: 38°10′54″N 76°59′49″W

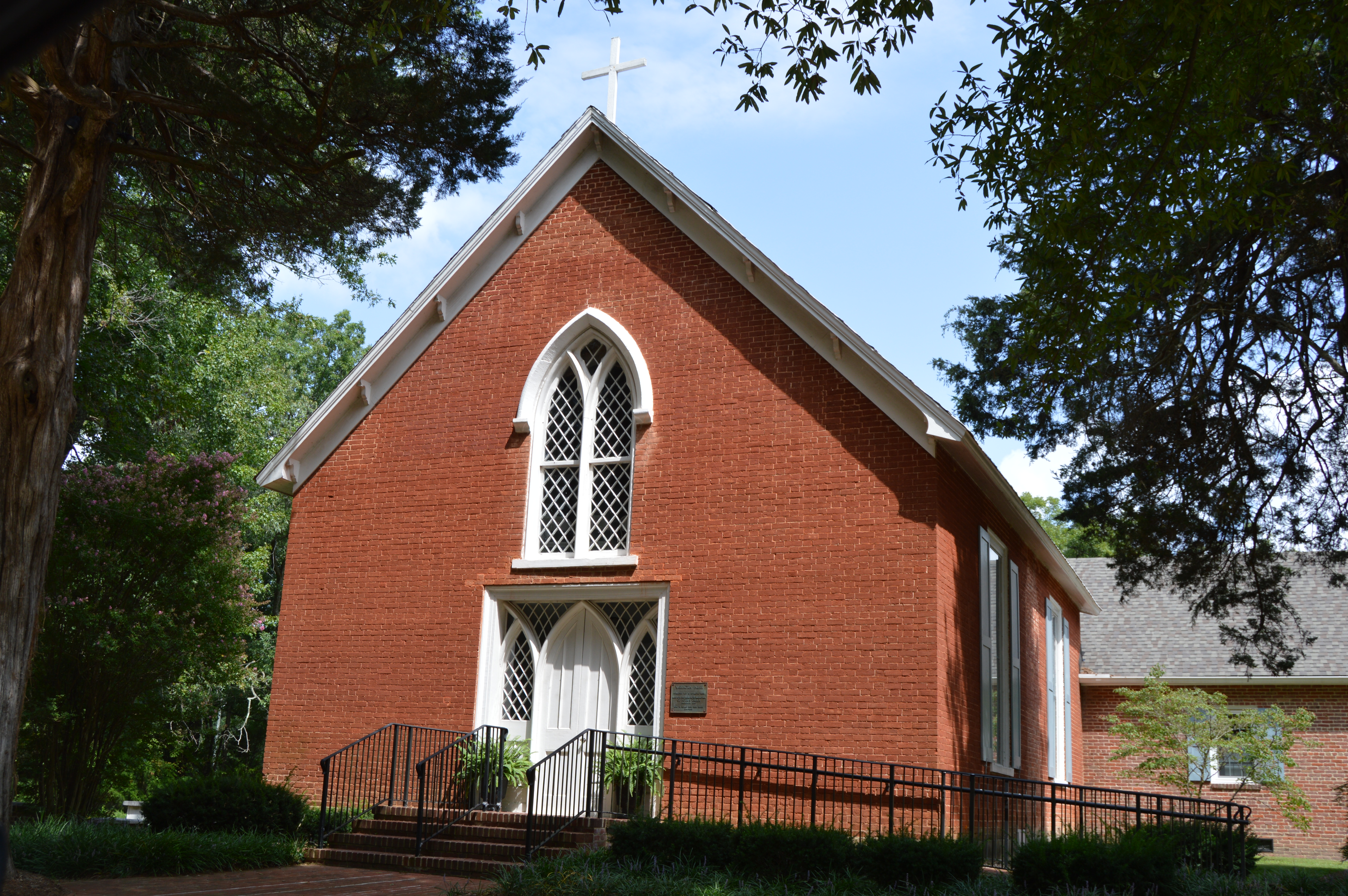
St. Peter's Episcopal Church

Oak Grove is an unincorporated community in the Washington District of Westmoreland County, Virginia, United States. The community, on the historic Northern Neck of Virginia (the peninsula between the Potomac and Rappahannock rivers), was a stagecoach stop in the early days of the Colony of Virginia.

It is close to the birthplaces of George Washington and James Monroe. The community also lies in a region of historic architecture, with notable buildings including Wirtland at Oak Grove, a Gothic Revival plantation house listed on the National Register of Historic Places. Ingleside, Roxbury, and St. Peter's Episcopal Church are also listed on the National Register of Historic Places.

Oak Grove is the site of Audley, the Critcher family plantation, notable residents of which have included United States Representative John Critcher and his daughter Catharine, a painter. Audley was also home to the Lyon sisters, Elizabeth and Lulie, both of whom were later to marry Claude A. Swanson.
