= Armstead T. Johnson High School =

Historic complex in Virginia, US

- U.S. National Register of Historic Places
- Virginia Landmarks Register
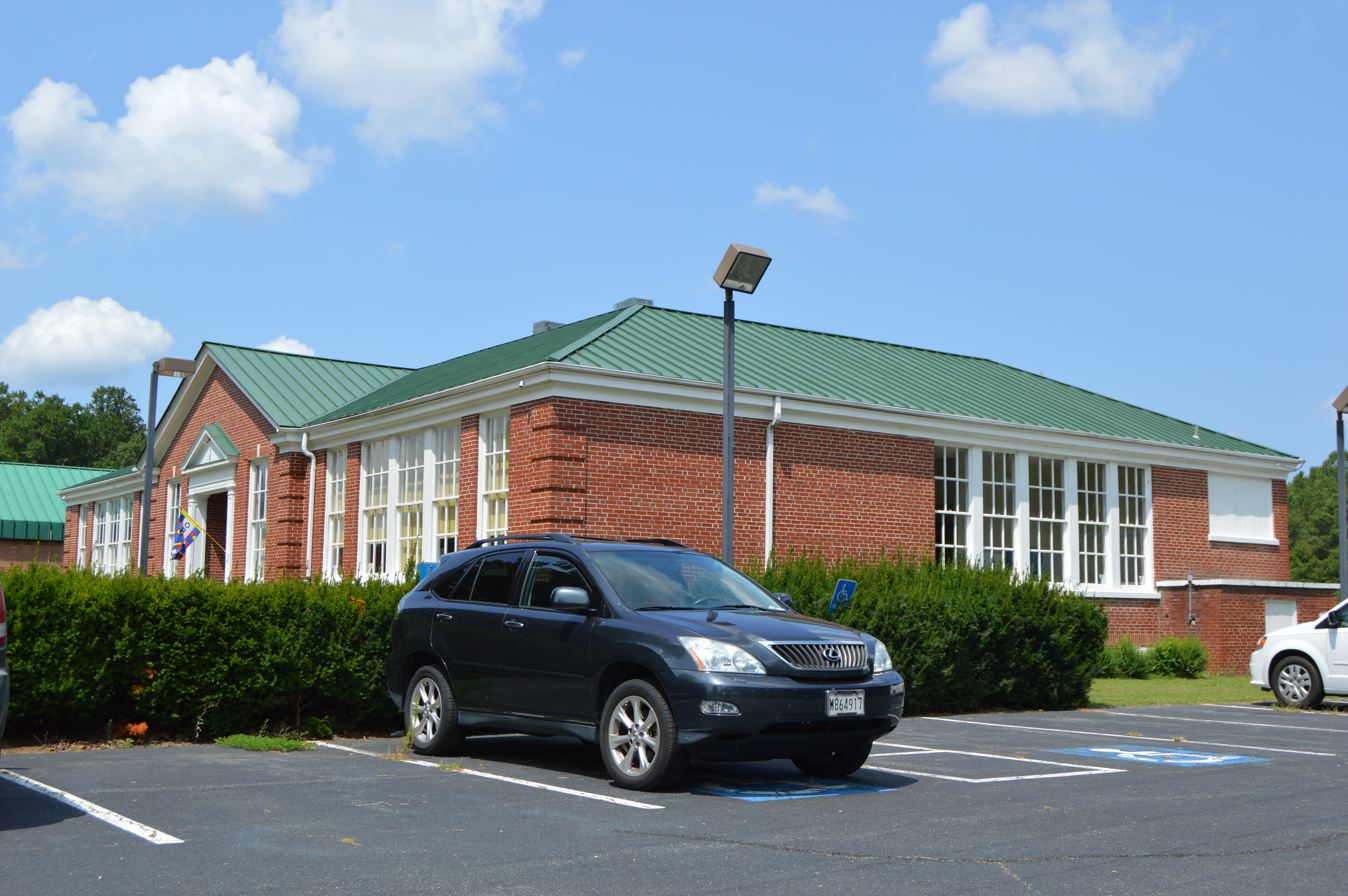
- Front and southeastern side

- Location within Virginia Location within the United States
- Location: 18849 State Route 3, Montross, Virginia
- Coordinates: 38°4′39″N 76°46′54″W
- Area: 4 acres (1.6 ha)
- Built: 1937
- Built by: C.E Nuchals, Raymond Dowling
- Architectural style: Colonial Revival
- NRHP reference No.: 98001071
- VLR No.: 096-0113

Significant dates
- Added to NRHP: August 14, 1998
- Designated VLR: June 17, 1998

Armstead T. Johnson High School is a historic high school complex for African-American students located near Montross, Westmoreland County, Virginia. The main building was built in 1937, and is a one-story, U-shaped Colonial Revival style brick building. Contributing structures on the property include the one-story, frame Industrial Arts Building and the one-story, frame Home Economics Cottage. At a time when the state had a policy of legal racial segregation in public schools, this was among the first purpose-built high schools for African Americans on the Northern Neck of Virginia.

The building, listed on the National Register of Historic Places in 1998, is now operated as a museum to preserve the history and legacy of education for African-American students in the Northern Neck, especially in Westmoreland County. It has collections, artifacts, memorabilia, and other materials related to this period.
