= Morgan Jones 1677 Pottery Kiln =

Archaeological site in Virginia, United States

- U.S. National Register of Historic Places
- Virginia Landmarks Register
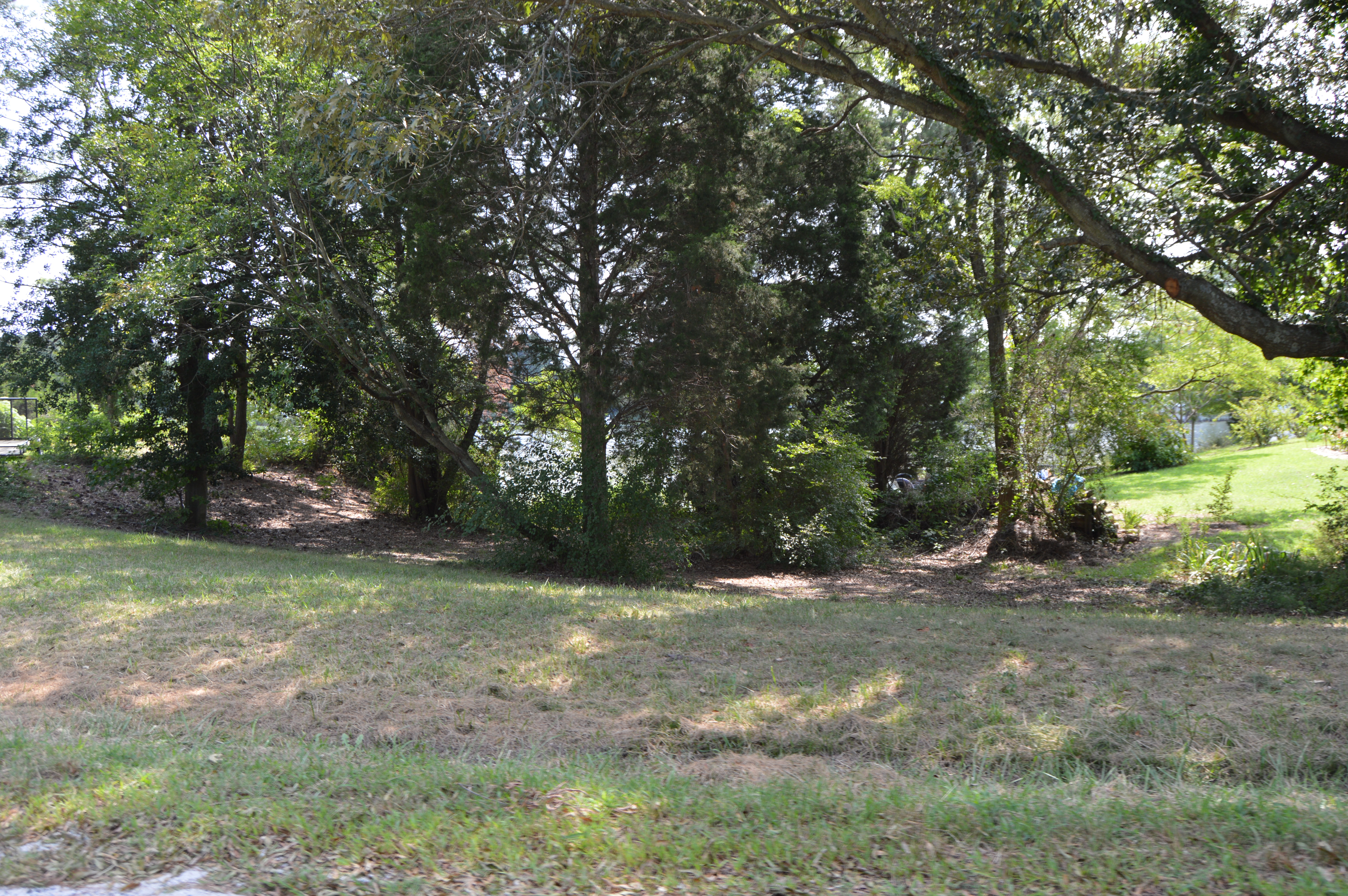
- Site of the kiln
- Nearest city: Hague, Virginia
- Area: 1 acre (0.40 ha)
- Built: 1677
- NRHP reference No.: 74002150
- VLR No.: 096-0081

Significant dates
- Added to NRHP: October 16, 1974
- Designated VLR: June 18, 1974

The Morgan Jones 1677 Pottery Kiln is a historic archaeological site located near Glebe Harbor and Hague, Westmoreland County, Virginia. The site was excavated in 1973 by staff from the Virginia Department of Historic Resources. It includes the remains of a pottery kiln operated by Morgan Jones and Dennis White in 1677. The kiln ceased operation when White died in 1677. The site has kiln remains and many fragmentary samples of the pottery manufactured there.

It was listed on the National Register of Historic Places in 1974. It is located along Mahodoc Creek.
