= Westmoreland, Virginia =

Unincorporated community in Virginia, US

Coordinates: 38°03′51″N 76°33′32″W

Westmoreland is an unincorporated community in Westmoreland County, in the U. S. state of Virginia.

Spence's Point was listed on the National Register of Historic Places in 1971.

== Notable people ==
Augustine Washington Sr. (1694-1743) - Father of U.S. President George Washington

Lawrence Washington (1718–1752) - Older half brother of U.S. President George Washington, soldier
