= Panorama (Montross, Virginia) =

Historic house in Virginia, United States

- U.S. National Register of Historic Places

- Location within Virginia Location within the United States
- Location: 1005 Panorama Road, Montross, Virginia
- Coordinates: 38.103014°N 76.842265°W
- Area: 133.5 acres (54.0 ha)
- Built: 1932
- Architectural style: Colonial Revival
- NRHP reference No.: 10001186
- Added to NRHP: January 31, 2011

Panorama is a historic estate in Montross, Virginia. The 2 1/2-story brick Colonial Revival house, located on an estate of over 130 acres (53 ha), was built in 1932 to a design by Joseph Evans Sperry for local politician and attorney Charles E. Stuart, and has been virtually unaltered since its construction. The building is sited between the two branches of Chandler's Mill Pond, and has two main facades, one facing the long drive from the road, and the other facing south toward the lake. The house is prominently visible from the Kings Highway (Virginia Route 3), which crosses the Chandler's Mill Pond Dam.

Panorama is strikingly similar to historic Bushfield, home of John Augustine Washington, brother of George Washington. The exterior design mimics the Colonial Revival renovations at Bushfield, which features the same dual facades, one a 3-bay entrance with projecting central block and the other a monumental 2-story portico. The interior staircase in Panorama is a mirror image of Bushfield Manor's.

The property was listed on the National Register of Historic Places in 2011.

The estate in Montross, Westmoreland County, Virginia was given the name "Panorama" for a former Stuart home in King George County.

This property should not be confused with the Panorama ruins of King George, Virginia that was an estate purchased by Richard Stuart of "Cedar Grove" in the early 1830s for his only daughter Margaret Robinson Stuart who married Thomas Lunsford Lomax.
