= Kinsale Historic District =

Historic district in Virginia, United States

- U.S. National Register of Historic Places
- U.S. Historic district
- Virginia Landmarks Register
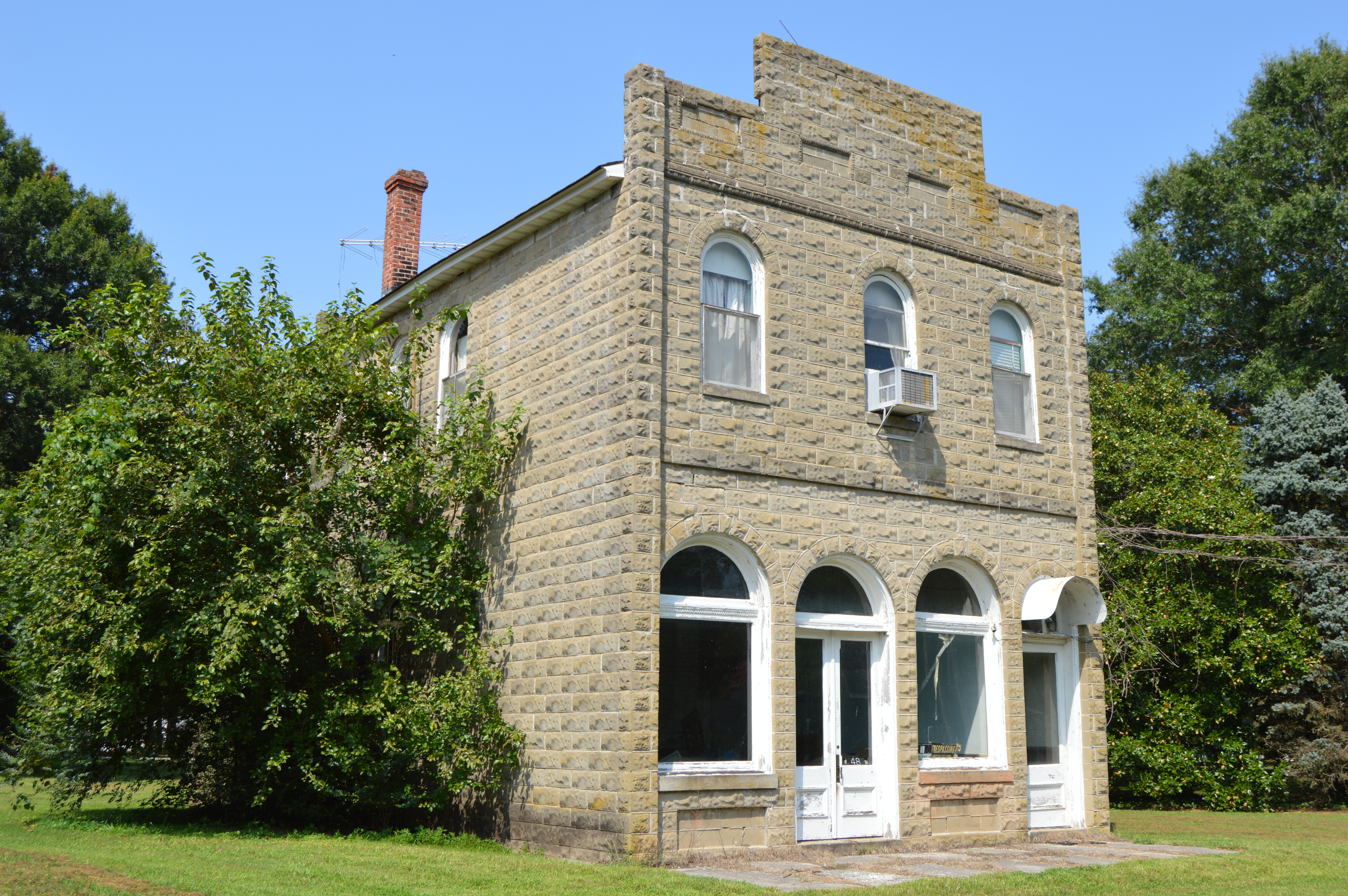
- Former Bank of Kinsale on Bank Street

- Location within Virginia Location within the United States
- Location: Roughly along Kinsale Rd., Kinsale Bridge Rd., Sigouney Dr., Great House Rd., and Yeocomico Ln., Kinsale, Virginia
- Coordinates: 38°01′53″N 76°34′42″W
- Area: 113 acres (46 ha)
- Built: 1784
- Architectural style: Federal, Late Victorian
- NRHP reference No.: 05000476
- VLR No.: 096-0090

Significant dates
- Added to NRHP: July 22, 2005
- Designated VLR: March 16, 2005

Kinsale Historic District is a national historic district located at Kinsale, Westmoreland County, Virginia. The district encompasses 65 contributing buildings in the historic core of the village of Kinsale. The district includes primarily residential and commercial buildings dating from the late-19th to early-20th centuries. Notable resources include the Bailey Cemetery, the Great House (c. 1827) and Little House (c. 1840), Plain View (c. 1872), Captain Charles Courtney House (c. 1880s), former Bank of Kinsale, former Palmer and Moore Kinsale Motor Corporation (c. 1918), Cople District Volunteer Fire Hall Department Building, Kinsale Foundation and Museum, and Kinsale Harbour Yacht Club.

It was listed on the National Register of Historic Places in 2005.
