= Wirtland =

Historic house in Virginia, United States

- U.S. National Register of Historic Places
- Virginia Landmarks Register
- Wirtland - Front lawn

- Location within Virginia Location within the United States
- Location: S of Oak Grove on VA 638, near Oak Grove, Virginia
- Coordinates: 38°9′21″N 77°0′29″W
- Area: 108 acres (44 ha)
- Built: 1850
- Architectural style: Gothic Revival
- NRHP reference No.: 79003097
- VLR No.: 096-0029

Significant dates
- Added to NRHP: March 15, 1979
- Designated VLR: December 21, 1976

Wirtland is a historic house in Westmoreland County, Virginia, United States, near the community of Oak Grove. Built in 1850 by William Wirt, Jr., the son of former U.S. Attorney General William Wirt, it has been recognized as a high-quality example of a rural Gothic Revival house of the period. Its historic status was recognized in 1979, when it was listed on the National Register of Historic Places.

Wirtland is a two-story brick house surrounded by an attached 15-acre (6.1 ha) park landscaped in the Victorian style. Constructed in the shape of a cross, the house is built around a central chimney, and multiple porches surround the stucco-covered exterior. The interior includes ornate plasterwork, marble mantels, and a spectacular 2 story spiral staircase. The Gothic theme is carried through many aspects of the ornamentation of the interior.

After Wirt's death in 1899, the house was owned by his son and daughter-in-law, William Dabney Wirt and Garnett Pendleton Wirt, who ran a boarding school for women in the house until its sale in 1918. After their ownership, Wirtland was purchased by Robert Edward Lee Lewis, a descendant of Martha Washington through her granddaughter, Eleanor Parke Custis Lewis. In 1924, they sold the house to their friend, author and playwright Paul Kester, who had previously owned Woodlawn Plantation and Gunston Hall. He sold the house in 1927, to Edward M. L'Engle, the grandson of the builder, Dr. William Wirt, through his eldest daughter, Fannie Wirt, who had grown up in the house. L'Engle lived in Florida but allowed his uncle, William Wirt, to spend his final years there, dying in 1930. After that, L'Engle's cousin, Augusta Dabney Wirt Nalle, and her husband lived at Wirtland. Augusta was the daughter of Daniel Payne Mastin Wirt, who had also grown up in the house. In 1940, Burton and Harriet Slocum purchased the home and oversaw extensive restoration in the 1940s and 1950s. Today, the house is considered one of Virginia's most significant houses of its style, and its park, which is also listed on the Register, is one of the few remaining examples of Victorian landscaping.

Since 1967, the property has been owned by Ingleside Plantation Nurseries and is the home of the company president. Next door is Roxbury, a Victorian house built by another son of Attorney General Wirt in the 1860s;. This home is owned by Ingleside Plantation Vineyards, one of the oldest vineyards in the state. Like Wirtland, Roxbury is listed on the National Register,.
