= Yeocomico Church =

Historic church in Virginia, US

- U.S. National Register of Historic Places
- U.S. National Historic Landmark
- Virginia Landmarks Register
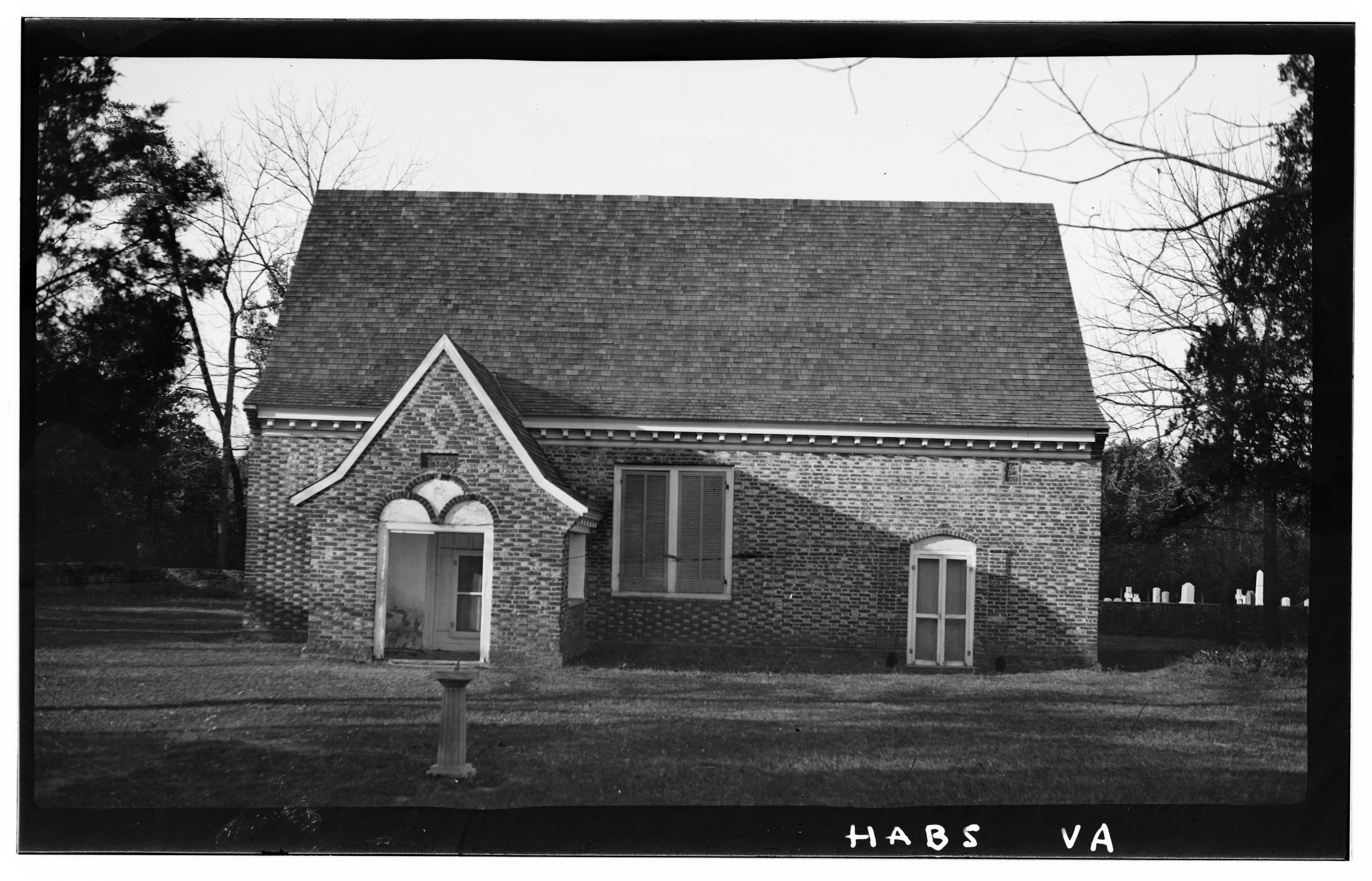

- Location within Virginia Location within the United States
- Nearest city: Kinsale, Virginia
- Coordinates: 38°3′44.5″N 76°35′49.7″W
- Area: 15 acres (6.1 ha)
- Architectural style: Colonial
- NRHP reference No.: 69000331
- VLR No.: 096-0031

Significant dates
- Added to NRHP: November 12, 1969
- Designated NHL: April 15, 1970
- Designated VLR: September 9, 1969

Yeocomico Church is a colonial-era Episcopal church near Kinsale in Westmoreland County in the U.S. state of Virginia. The church building dates as far back as 1706. It is now the main church of Cople Parish, which also includes Nomini Church near Mount Holly. Yeocomico Church, the fourth oldest in the state, was designated as a National Historic Landmark in 1970.

The cemetery includes the graves of several bishops and author John Dos Passos.

== History ==
=== Colonial era ===
In 1653, the western boundary of Northumberland County was set at Nomini Creek, and shortly thereafter a parish was ordered on the western end, perhaps briefly named Westbury. (This part of the county, west of Hampton Hall Creek, would be transferred to Westmoreland County in the 1664 reorganization. In that reorganization the eastern part of the reboundaried Westmoreland County, including the former Westbury parish, was organized as Cople Parish.) With the appointment of the first vestry in 1655, Yeocomico's original wooden structure was built that year, parts of which were incorporated into the successor church. That first building was replaced in 1706 by a structure built of locally fired bricks.

=== American Revolution and after ===
According to local tradition, the church became barracks during the American Revolution. A special tax assessment was made for repairs to the church in 1788, a period where the Episcopal Church was still government-supported in Virginia. The church was, like most other Anglican churches in Virginia, abandoned after either the Revolution or the Episcopal Church's disestablishment (in Virginia) circa 1794. Its last 18th century rector was present in 1799 but thereafter disappears from the record. Afterwards, as the building fell into disrepair, sheep were reportedly stabled there overnight from time to time.

During the War of 1812, part of the U.S. 36th Regiment camped in the courtyard. Among the soldiers of the 36th was William L. Rogers from Princeton, New Jersey, who after the war would return and marry Ann Ballantine Murphy, daughter of the owners of Ayrfield, the property adjacent to the church. Rogers wrote a letter to Bishop William Meade forty years later in which he described the condition of the church in 1814: "Its doors were open, its windows broken, the roof partly decayed and fallen in, and, to complete its apparent hopeless fate, a pine-tree thirty or forty feet nigh was blown up by the roots and lay across the main structure." The soldiers undertook to remove the tree, and to "cleanse the church and repair it as far as practicable, to make it a safe depository for our stores and camp-equipage." Rogers relates that, after they had been ordered to the defense of Fort McHenry, a "company of militia from the upper country" had set up camp there, and caused considerable damage to the church as well as the surrounding countryside. They used the communion table as a chopping block, although its surface was later restored. Some "American patrol" (likely part of this latter group) took away the baptismal font to use as a drinking bowl. The baptismal font was regained and taken to Ayrfield where Mr. Murphy restored it. On a later visit in 1820, Rogers was so disturbed at the church's condition that he persuaded his father-in-law to enlist the aid of other neighbors to do what repairs and restoration they could.

In 1838, when bishop Meade visited, he noted that "The architecture is rough, but very strong, and the materials must have been of the best kind.... It has undergone but little repair since its first erection, and indeed has needed little. It is not known or believed that a single new shingle has ever been put upon the roof, and the pews and whole interior are the same." Meade was then (in 1838) unaware of the 1788 repairs that had been made; nor did he know the extent of repairs undertaken in the 1820s and early 1830s, though he knew that the leaders of the latter efforts were Mr. Murphy (by then deceased) and Mr. Rogers. By this time, the Rev. Washington Nelson had been conducting occasional services in the parish for some time, though not in the church at first. Rev. Nelson was serving parishes in Richmond County as well; he appears to have been formally installed as "settled minister" of Cople Parish by 1834.

In 1844, a local congregation of Methodists sued to take possession of the church, but it legally reverted to the Episcopalians who continue its use as an active congregation. Major repairs to the brickwork, windows, and roof ware performed in 1928 and an initial plaque was installed above the chancel's round window. Electricity was added in 1947 and a heating system in 1949. The roof shingles were replaced in 1954. Ameslee Hall, the new vestry hall with architectural features compatible with Yeocomico Church, was added several years ago.

=== Dating ===
This is the fourth oldest complete church in Virginia preceded by Newport Parish in Smithfield 1680, York-Hampton Parish Church (Grace Church) 1697, and St. Peter's in New Kent County 1701. The original part of the present building can be assigned a date of 1706 according to a dating brick in the south east wall. The north wing was most likely erected circa 1725. It is the second church on this site; the earlier building was a wooden structure of "oak timbers, sheathed with clapboards.". Curiously, parts of the wooden structure, including a corner post inside the east gable and a portion of a beam were found embedded in the walls. It has been suggested with no real proof that the brick walls were erected around the frame of the earlier wooden one, essentially encasing it. It is far more likely that some wooden elements of the earlier church were re-used in the construction of the present brick edifice.

=== Parish affiliation ===
Like most early churches in Virginia, Yeocomico Church's parish membership has changed as the population of Westmoreland County grew or shifted. A brief outline shows this:

- 1653: Part of Lower Nominy or Westbury Parish: Westmoreland County established, but Yeocomico Church was still in Northumberland County
- 1661: Upper Nominy Parish became Appomattocks Parish
- 1662: Westmoreland and Northumberland counties temporarily reunited
- 1664: Westmoreland County reorganized to include western Northumberland County while the entire western chunk of former Westmoreland was carved off as Stafford County
- 1664-68: Lower Nominy (and Westbury) Parish was renamed Cople Parish before 1668.

It is the only remaining colonial church in Cople Parish and Westmoreland County.

==== Other churches ====
The Cople Parish also includes the Nomini Church (c. 1850) near Mount Holly and the St. James Church (built 1890) in Tidwells, Virginia. The original building for the Nomini Church was built around 1648 on the west side of Nomini Creek near Mount Holly, and replaced by a new building across the creek in 1704, which itself was replaced in 1751. The present church was built on the east bank of the creek somewhere near 1850, but in infrequent use for much of the last century and damaged by a tornado in February 2016.

== Architecture ==
Yeocomico is a room church that shows a combination of features from the Virginia Gothic tradition, as in Newport Parish and St. Peter's, New Kent County, combined with the emerging Classical style of the Virginia church of the eighteenth century. Its unique features are:

- The presence of a southwest doorway with an enclosing porch
- The first example of kicked eaves in a colonial church
- The establishment of a baroque juxtaposition of "masses and complex shapes"
- Reduction of exterior decoration to understated elements
  - Corbelling of the corners of the church and porch
  - A belt course of glazed brick
  - Diapering on the porch façade
  - A series of brick arches filled with plaster on the porch façade
  - Corbels on the gables
- A wicket door
- Brick ornaments of initial plaques, emblem plaques, and a millstone inserted in the chancel upper window.

=== Dimensions ===
The church is T-shaped with irregular dimensions and bonds on the brick walls. The bricks themselves were supposedly dug and kilned a hundred yards to the northeast of the church. There is a marker with a brass plaque indicating this in the churchyard. The chancel and west walls of the east-west wing that form the main body of the church and comprise its earliest sections differ significantly in their dimensions. The other structures of the church, the north wing and the porch, show a similar variability.

Main church			North Wing			Porch			North Wing
South Wall	NE Wall	NW Wall	North Wall	East Wall	West Wall	South Wall	West Wall	East Wall	to South Wall
51' 3"	26' 3"	27' 4"	26' 7"	26' 4"	23' 11"	13' 1"	12' 9"	12' 11"	50' 8"

Also the north wing and the porch are not aligned but offset so that the porch stands far to the west of the north wing. The dimensions of the main building, the north wing, and the porch are singular in being so varied; all other Virginia churches have north-south and east-walls perfectly aligned with equal dimensions. The best consensus is that the church was most likely built as a rectangular edifice in 1706 with the north wing added in the 1720s.

=== Brickwork ===
The brickwork is typical of Virginia colonial churches in being laid with a water table, a section standing on the foundation, a brick's length wider than the walls that are nineteen inches thick. The transition from the water table to the walls is made with an ovolo, a convex ¼ round, molded brick. As is the custom, English bond is present on all of the water table. The walls, however, are varied in their brickwork with some sections being laid in Flemish bond, other sections in English bond, and still other sections in irregular, mixed bond. Flemish bond is used regularly on the porch and most of the south wall. English bond is used on the upper eastern part of the south wall, the east and west gables, two sections of the north wall and the chancel wall. The north wing is a mixture of Flemish and irregular bonds. Glazed headers are used with some regularity in the walls as is typical with Flemish bond, but some sections show an irregular use of this feature also

All of the walls show extensive repointing and other repairs to the brick and mortar. These may be of late nineteenth- or twentieth-century origin as Meade reports in an 1838 visit that few repairs were evident. The present edifice, however, shows alterations to almost all of the surfaces: south wall of porch; west wall of porch; upper right part of south wall; south wall under window and lower left corner; vertical line between window and eastern doorway; water table between window and eastern doorway; chancel wall on east; chancel gable; chancel water table; north wall of chancel around small window; north gable apex; west wall lower left; north wall of nave; west wall of nave.

=== Doors ===
The location of and features of the doors make this church a study in the transition from the Gothic room church to the Classical room church in Virginia.

==== Wicket door ====
Inside the south porch is a wicket door, the only known one in an American colonial church. It consists of five vertical sections and three horizontal sections each divided by battens. The smaller door is located within the middle three battens vertically and the central one horizontally. Cyma reversa mouldings are used on the battens. In the 1960s, the area around the doorway's segmental arch was covered with a layer of plaster. [The plaster has been removed, and brick repairs are evident.] The doorway's wooden molding is of a cyma reversa, reverse S, curve. On the hinge side is a large wooden peg that keeps the upper hinge from pulling out of the frame. The hinges consist of thick pintles at the top and bottom of the left side of the door. The door is said to weigh 1,000 pounds.

The door is six feet wide and eight feet high and is of two thicknesses. There is a large, horizontal board at the top, then two small boards, and at the bottom four more horizontal boards. The outer door is held in place by large strap hinges that are obviously hand made.

The inset wicket door also has a pair of strap hinges that are miniature images of the larger door with similar construction from horizontal boards. There is a single deadbolt on the inside of the door.

==== Southeast door ====
The door frame for this opening is highly altered in almost every detail with the exception of the basic size. The door itself may be original but is almost certainly of old if not of colonial origin. It consists of a pair of narrow, white battened doors opening at the center. Each door has a pair of vertical recessed panels on the top and bottom half, comprising four panels on each door. The brick arch is obviously a replacement, but the wooden door trim consisting of two vertical frames surmounted by a horizontal board bearing a chamfer and lamb's tongue molding may be of colonial age. The vertical frame members extend beyond the lintel to the bottom of the brick arch. The space between the arch and the top board is filled with flat plaster. The sill is a simple wooden one. In all likelihood, this opening had a pediment of unknown appearance in colonial days. It is the only door in the church that has a lock and key. These are of modern origin.

==== North door ====
This opening on the end of the north wing consists of a full-width, battened door bearing four vertical, recessed panels similar to the south door. The frame and brickwork surrounding it are probably reworked. This is especially evident in the brick framing on the top that is now a simple course of Flemish bond. The wooden door frame consists of three sets of flat boards, becoming progressively narrower toward the doorway. There is a bevel between the outermost frame member and a semi-round molding between the two inner boards. Both the north and south doors are secured by strap hinges on the inside.

=== Windows ===
The original window openings are difficult to ascertain due to successive and significant reworkings of the walls since 1900. Despite this, the general form of the windows is in all probability similar to the present openings. The general form most likely follows that of St. Peter's Church in New Kent county that has diamond-shaped leaded panes set in square casement windows, though, these too are reproductions from fragments discovered on the site. Diamond-paned windows were in common use in England since the 1630s. The present windows are clearly not colonial and reflect changes in fenestration during the nineteenth century.

The rectangular windows on the south, east, north wing of the east wall, the west wall, and all walls in the north wing are similar. They consist of two rectangular, facing guillotine sashed windows covered by heavy wooden shutters painted dark green and fixed with wrought iron H or H-L hinges. The shutters are not of colonial origin. The east façade had two window openings: a large rectangular one that is 9 feet wide and 8' 2" high with 16 over 16 glass panes and a circular window above it with an inner section in quarters and an outer section in eighths. The circular window, in particular, is of uncertain authenticity as it is claimed that until restorations in 1930 it contained not the present type of window but either plastered over stone and rubble or a millstone. All of the other windows have 12 over 12 glass panes. The single south window is 7' 2" wide and 8 feet high white the north wing has two smaller windows on its east and west walls and another on its north face. The frames for all the windows are flat with painted wood. The wooden, bottom sill projects slightly from the frame. All have brick sills with ovolo cast bricks marking them.

=== Interior ===
The interior of the church has been extensively reworked and little remains, either physically or stylistically, from colonial times. It is painted white on all surfaces with the exception of the tops of the railings.

The chancel still remains in the east wing and has some reconstructed colonial features. It is on a platform raised a foot or so from the church floor. On either side of the window opening are simple rectangular tablets bearing on the left The Lord's Prayer above the Apostles' Creed and on the right Exodus XX (The Ten Commandments) under which is printed the Summary of the Law. In the middle is a reredos, obviously of non-colonial origin with an opening for the window incorporated within it. It bears, from the top down: 1) a cross placed so as to intersect center of the circular window; 2) a truncated tympanum, 3) a square-columned pilaster on either side of the window, and 4) a bottom forming a flat window sill. The chancel is physically separated from the rest of the church by 4-foot-tall (1.2 m) vertical panels a few feet north and south of the window openings and a rail with 8 turned balusters on either side and a central opening. There are south and north facing seats in the space between the side panels and the outer walls, on the north a built-in slip pew and on the south a short bench.

On the right, or south, is the pulpit, reader's desk, and clerk's desk, the reader's desk supposedly made from portions of the original pulpit. The reader's desk stands just in front of (north) of the main pulpit. All of this stands to the west side of the south window on a raised platform but, unlike the chancel, has no separating rail. Between the chancel and the raised area for the pulpit is a small organ enclosed by vertical panels. Behind the organ are two choir pews facing north. (This is a crowded church with very narrow aisles.) In front of the clerk's desk is the baptismal font. To the west of the raised pulpit are two rows of three slip pews with a central aisle. The rest of the ground level of the church is taken up by rows of slip pews facing south in what is essentially a nave area.

The present aisles were most likely demarcated in 1824 but may have been established as late as 1873. Originally there were galleries in both the north and west wings, but only the north remains. The balusters there are probably original, and the gallery itself is largely colonial. The present brick floors are clearly not of colonial age as is the case with the raised platforms for the chancel and pulpit.

=== Ceiling ===
The ceiling resembles the general form of the original but is a reconstruction from numerous repairs, particularly in 1928 and 1939. It is a compass ceiling with two tie beams. The 1706 ceiling was of "hand-riven oak" laid on rafters and collar beams. It has been replaced by a clapboard ceiling matching the general features of the north wing. The tie beams, that are marked with a lamb's tongue and chamfer, are original while the roof trusses were replaced in the 1820s. The beam farthest north bears the figures "iiii" and the beam farthest south is a clumsy insertion. The porch trusses may be original. A new shingle roof was installed in 1954.

=== Objects ===
The communion table is the oldest in the state and is undoubtedly an original feature of this church. It is a walnut table with dimension of 65 inches × 30". It has baluster-like, robust legs and a bottom rail on all four sides. The molding of the edge of the upper rail is a reversed S (cyma reversa). Reportedly it was used as a chopping block by an American patrol during the War of 1812, and it shows a documented disregard of the sacerdotal nature of communion tables in early American churches cited by Upton as including: use as a desk for in-church schools, use as a hat table, instances of their being "pushed around carelessly," going so far that stray dogs stole the communion bread and even urinated on the table legs. Hence, regulations were passed that the table in each church must be located on the east wall and that a protective rail be erected around it. The use of any church as a school, in particular, is puzzling because most colonial vestries scrupulously avoided using the church even for parish business, meeting in a separate vestry house close by a church or in the room formed by bell towers such as at St. Peter's, New Kent County. The vestry house for this church remained as a ruin just outside the west wall until 1820.

The baptismal font of gray polished marble is original to the church. It is octagonal in shape and now stands on a painted, white sandstone pedestal of unknown origin that is not original. It is on the far northwest corner of the platform holding the pulpit. It was most probably, like that of all but three surviving fonts for colonial churches, made without a pedestal and placed on a table inside the church instead. Upton notes that it closely resembles baptismal bowls in books of standardized fonts common in England at the time.

Other objects are also associated with the church from colonial days. The silver-plated chalice is probably and earlier one that has been "reworked". There is a sundial to the south of the church either donated or fabricated by Philip Smith in 1717. Five colonial grave markers are spaced throughout the churchyard: in 1963, three were illegible and two were table tombs moved from "Wilmington" home of the Newton family about a mile and a half west of the church. [DELETE (Wilmington, Virginia, is over one hundred miles northwest of Yeocomico).]

The church is surrounded by a wall of modern origin, one of several replacements. In 1838, this wall is reported by Bishop Meade as "mouldering away" while the obviously old sections of the wall may be "very old". The present gates may have been present in 1920 as a painting of that date shows similar gates in place. Colonial churches only sporadically had graveyards such as this one enclosed by walls as most parishioners tended to inter their dead on their own plantations or farms.

=== Embellishments ===
The wicket door of the church has pilasters on either side unseen in other Virginia colonial churches. Each pilaster consists of the following structure from the bottom at the water table to the top: water table – five bricks (identical in height to rest of the water table); border of beveled brick; pillar – 11 convex bricks one brick wide; a torus- shaped border brick; a pillar of 8 horizontally convex bricks; a border brick of an ovolo with a flat edge on top; the apex of two bricks in the form of a flattened arrow; and a tip of a half-sphere one-half brick wide [see the gallery picture of the wicket door].

By contrast, the southeast door has a simple, rectangular pilaster consisting of bas-relief column extending from the water table to the top edge of the door. It is flat and 1 ½ bricks wide. From bottom to top it contains: a column of eight bricks; a beveled heading; a column of nine bricks; a torus heading; a column of five bricks; an ovolo heading with a flat top. [See the gallery picture of the south door.]

Even more curious is the presence of patterns of glazed bricks and various plaques bearing initials and enigmatic symbols. As already mentioned, the porch gable contains glazed headers in a diamond shape (diapering) and a glazed header barge line (a diagonal line of bricks following the barge boards on the gable), but these embellishments are unevenly spaced so that the diamond is clearly off-center (see porch picture in gallery). This irregularity is true for the use of glazed headers throughout the structure.

The plaques bearing initials, dates, and idiosyncratic symbols are also most unusual and distinctive to this church. They are:

- An S and G were once said to be on porch gable but no longer evident.
- Porch gable: the initials S—G—M placed in separate bricks surrounding a brick bearing the image of a thistle.
- Southeast doorway: R.L. carved in brick.
- South Wall: 1706 IGI – below the G an English rose (originally placed over nearby, south, doorway).
- Chancel Wall: Initials – IB, IS, WL, IS, IC, IT, AD, TB (Js for John or Joseph): Star between the I and B and T and S is a flower.
- Chancel above circular window has initials of vestrymen and workers of 1928.

All of these plaques have an ovolo sill and some, such as the date plaque have a complete inset of molded brick. The initials on the porch and over the southeast doorway are incised while the others are in bas-relief.

== Summary ==
Architecturally, it is a transition from the Gothic featured room churches of seventeenth-century Virginia to the Georgian, classically featured churches characteristic of the Virginia vernacular church. It shows a movement from the "massiveness of . . . earlier churches" toward a "baroque feeling for masses and complex shapes", with unique characteristics such as the southwest porch and the pronounced kicked eaves derived from English architectural traditions.

Rawlings states: "While the greater part of the church, of course, owes a great deal to both the late Gothic and early Classical manners of building, much of it also derives from the naïve and primitive skills and ways of its early artificers, who built an ornamented their church in much the same natural and God-fearing way ... Yeocomico today is still a relatively a remote spot that is blessedly not too much overcome by latter day sophistication. "When it is said that Yeocomico Church is fascinating, quaint, and artless beyond compare, it must also be said that it is equally perplexing, particularly as to its original shape and masonry"

== Gallery ==
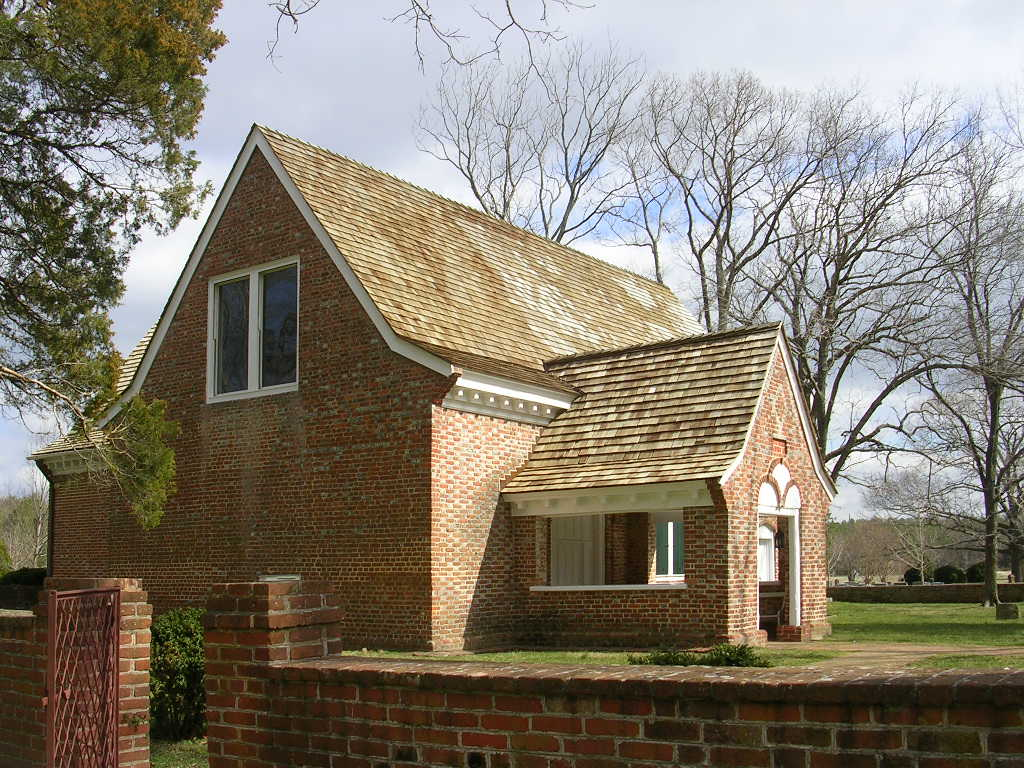
Yeocomico Church: south-west view 2008

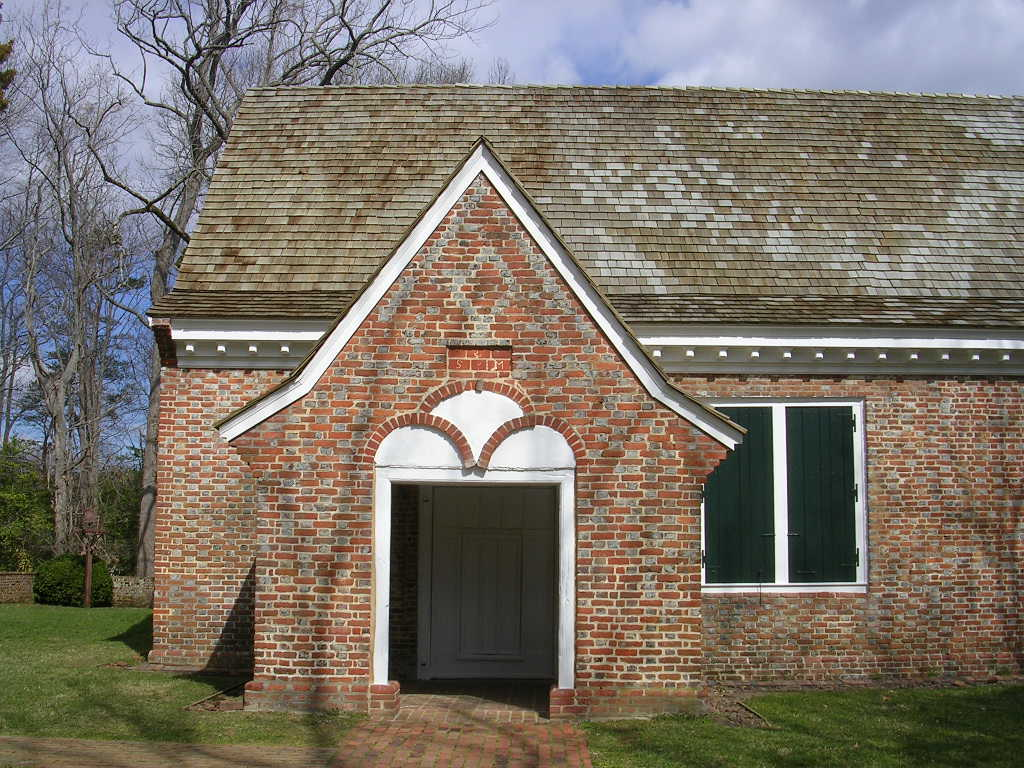
Yeocomico Church: south porch in unique in Virginia churches

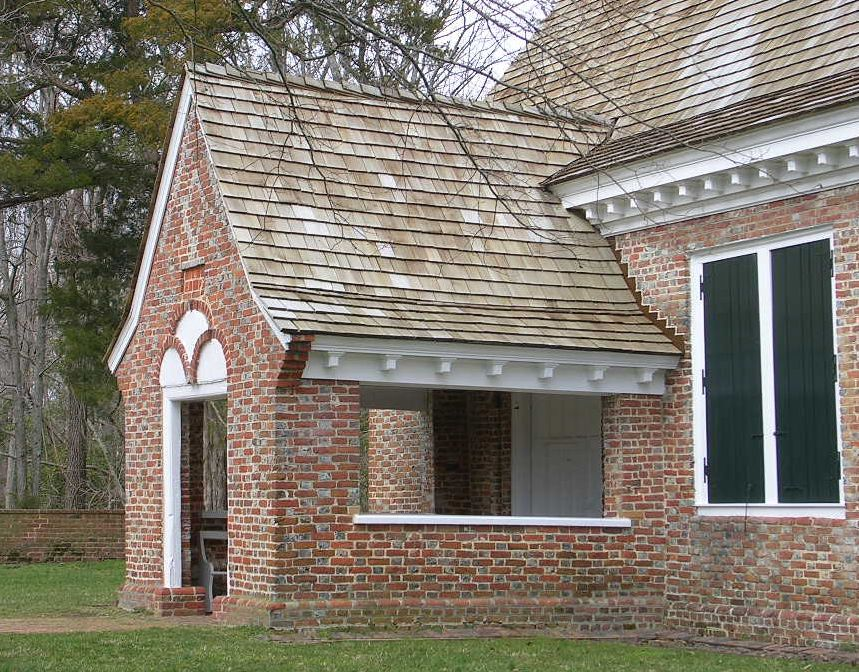
Yeocomico Church: sw view of porch

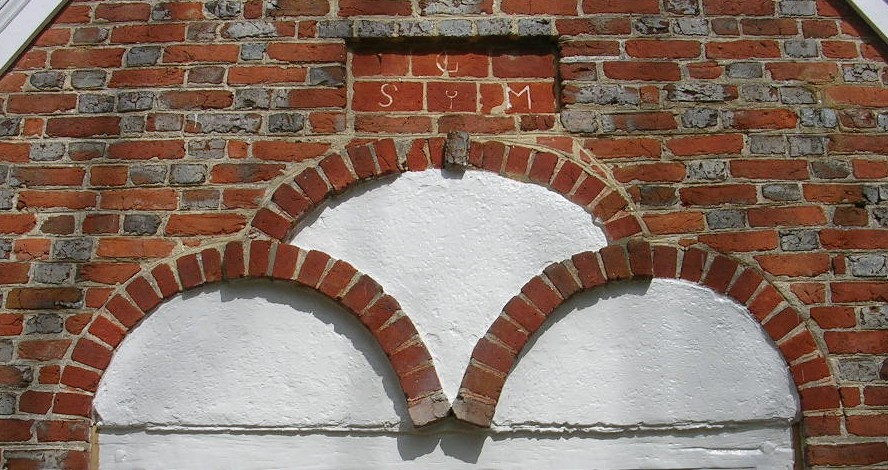
Yeocomico Church Porch Arches: note initials and thistle on inset

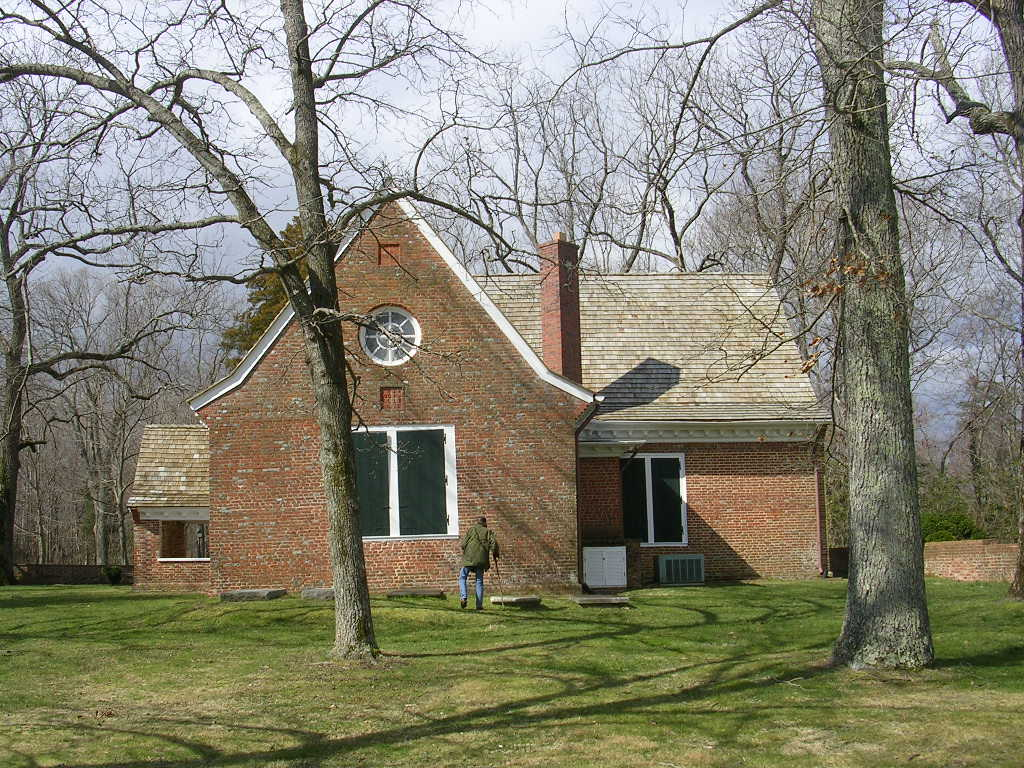
Yeocomico Church East View: note the windows

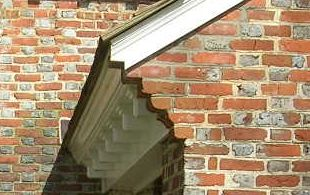
Yeocomico Church Porch Gable: note restored corbeils and modillion cornice

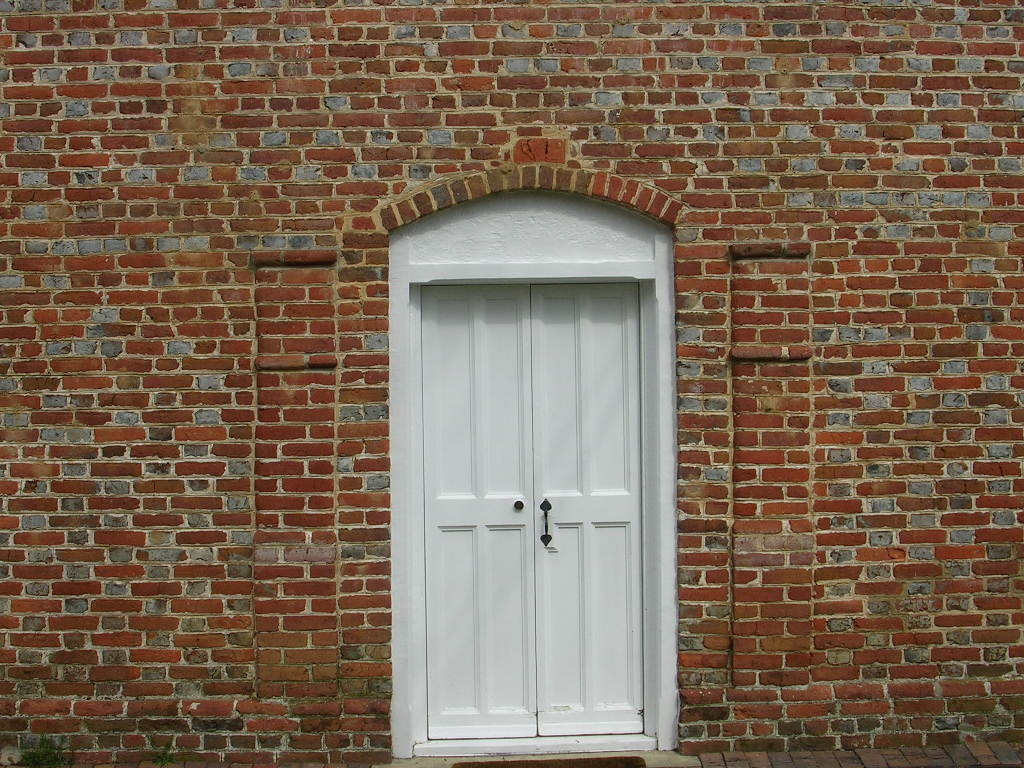
Yeocomico Church Southeast Door: note pilasters and varied brickwork

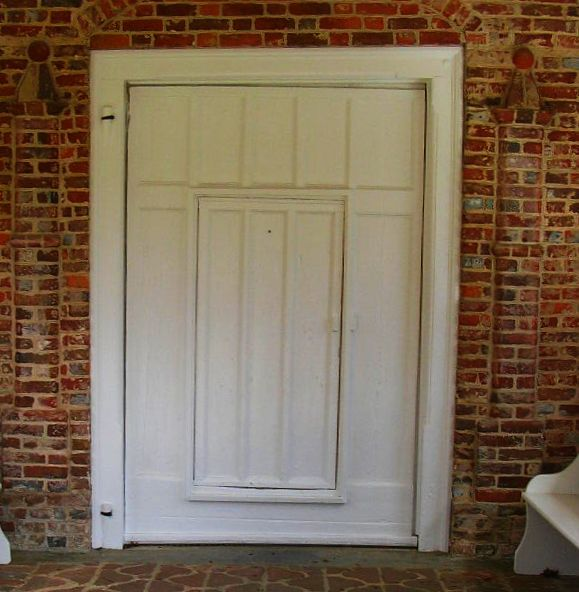
Yeocomico Church Wicket Door: note pilasters

== See also ==
- List of National Historic Landmarks in Virginia
- National Register of Historic Places listings in Westmoreland County, Virginia

== Bibliography ==
- Brock, Henry I. (1930). Colonial Churches in Virginia. Richmond, Va.: Dale press.
- Meade, William (1995). Old Churches, Ministers, and Families of Virginia. Philadelphia: Genealogical Publishing Co, Inc, 1847.
- Mason, George C. (1945). Colonial Churches of Tidewater Virginia. Richmond, Virginia: Whittet and Shepperson.
- Rawlings, James S. (1963). Virginia's Colonial Churches: An Architectural Guide. Richmond, Virginia: Garrett and Massie.
- Upton, Dell [1986] (1997). Holy Things and Profane: Anglican Parish Churches in Colonial Virginia. New Haven and London: Yale University Press.
- The Episcopal Churches of Cople Parish.
