= Tidwells, Virginia =

Unincorporated community in Virginia, US

Coordinates: 38°07′16″N 76°38′41″W

Tidwells is an unincorporated community in Westmoreland County, in the U. S. state of Virginia.

Tidwells is located in the Northern Neck region of Virginia, a peninsula bordered by the Potomac and Rappahannock rivers. The area is largely rural and is known for its historical sites and agricultural activities.
