= Roxbury (Oak Grove, Virginia) =

Historic house in Virginia, United States

- U.S. National Register of Historic Places
- Virginia Landmarks Register
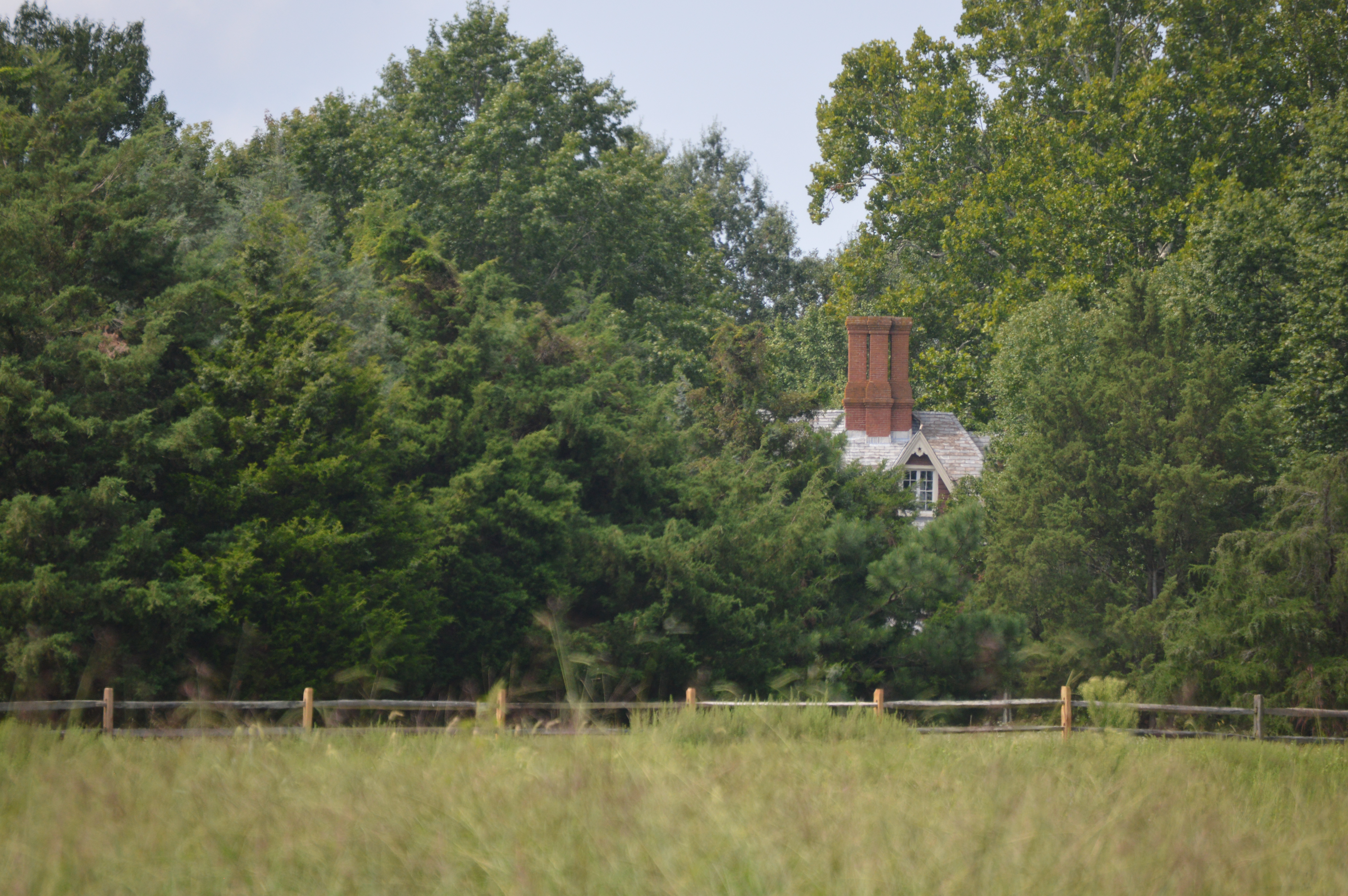
- Distant view from Leedstown Road

- Location within Virginia Location within the United States
- Location: 1.7 mi. S of Oak Grove, near Oak Grove, Virginia
- Coordinates: 38°09′28″N 77°00′06″W
- Area: 10 acres (4.0 ha)
- Built: 1861
- Architectural style: Late Victorian, Picturesque mode
- NRHP reference No.: 79003096
- VLR No.: 096-0020

Significant dates
- Added to NRHP: March 15, 1979
- Designated VLR: December 21, 1976

Roxbury is a historic home located near Oak Grove, Westmoreland County, Virginia.

== Overview ==
It was built in 1861, and is a two-story, T-shaped frame dwelling with a two-bay front section and a three-bay rear wing. It features a one-story front porch supported by coupled, bracketed columns; steeply pitched gable roofs with deep projecting eaves and gables; two large gabled dormers; and sawn-work ornaments. Each wing has a central chimney with four square stacks joined at its corbelled caps. Roxbury was built for Dabney Carr Wirt (1814/1815-1888), the oldest brother of William Wirt, Jr., builder of Wirtland, and son of William Wirt, the noted jurist, statesman and author.

It was listed on the National Register of Historic Places in 1979.
