= Montross, Virginia =

- Town
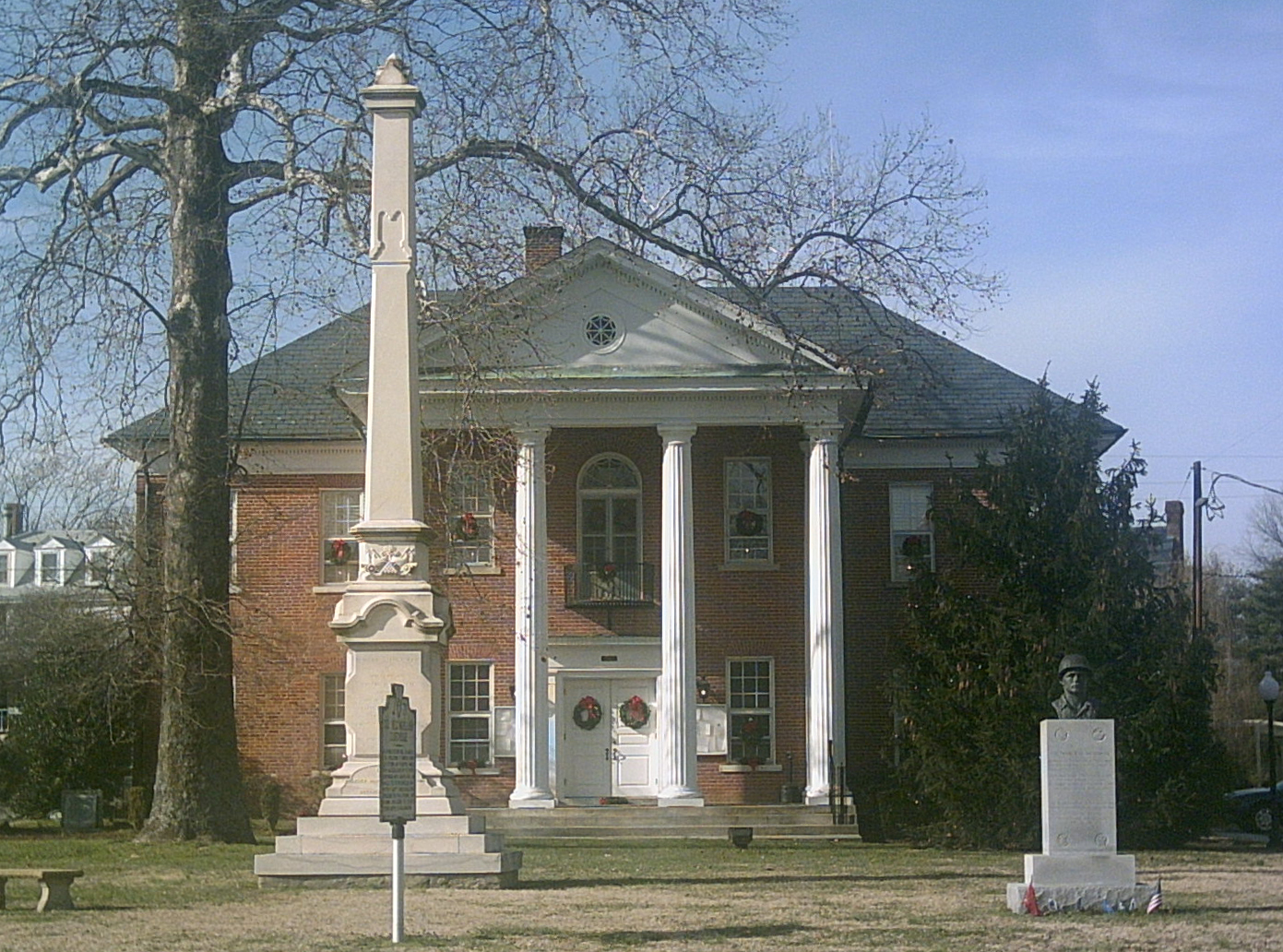
- Courthouse in Montross, with historic marker in foreground

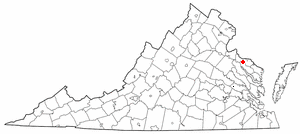
- Location of Montross, Virginia
- Coordinates: 38°5′38″N 76°49′34″W
- Country: United States
- State: Virginia
- County: Westmoreland

Area
  - Total: 1.03 sq mi (2.67 km^{2})
  - Land: 1.03 sq mi (2.67 km^{2})
  - Water: 0 sq mi (0.00 km^{2})
- Elevation: 164 ft (50 m)

Population (2020)
  - Total: 333
  - Density: 378.4/sq mi (146.11/km^{2})
- Time zone: UTC−5 (Eastern (EST))
  - Summer (DST): UTC−4 (EDT)
- ZIP code: 22520
- Area code: 804
- FIPS code: 51-52952
- GNIS feature ID: 1498518
- Website: https://www.townofmontross.org

Montross is a town in Westmoreland County, Virginia, United States. The population was 553 at the 2020 census. It is the county seat of Westmoreland County. Located in the historic Northern Neck of Virginia, Montross is near the George Washington Birthplace National Monument and the Stratford Hall Plantation (the birthplace of Robert E. Lee and Founding Fathers and signers of the Declaration of Independence, Richard Henry Lee and Francis Lightfoot Lee). The town's slogan is return to the village.

== History ==
The Old Westmoreland Court House in Montross was the site of notable events in 1774–1775 connected with the Revolutionary War. According to a historic marker at the courthouse, a resolution was introduced by Richard Henry Lee and adopted at a meeting there on June 22, 1774, providing aid to Boston, Massachusetts, following a blockade of that beleaguered port city by Great Britain. The seizure in 1775 of the Virginia Colony's gunpowder supply in Williamsburg on orders of the Royal Governor, in what became known as the Gunpowder Incident, prompted the Westmoreland Committee of Safety to convene at the Court House on May 23, 1775. The committee passed a resolution denouncing the governor, Lord Dunmore, for his actions.

Westmoreland High School, formerly Washington and Lee High School, is located in the town.

Emmy Award-winning video engineer Walter Balderson, who attended Washington and Lee High School, is from Montross. Current Brooklyn Nets forward Justin Anderson was born in Montross, and played collegiately at the University of Virginia.

The Armstead T. Johnson High School, Westmoreland State Park Historic District, and Panorama are listed on the National Register of Historic Places.

=== Lerty ===
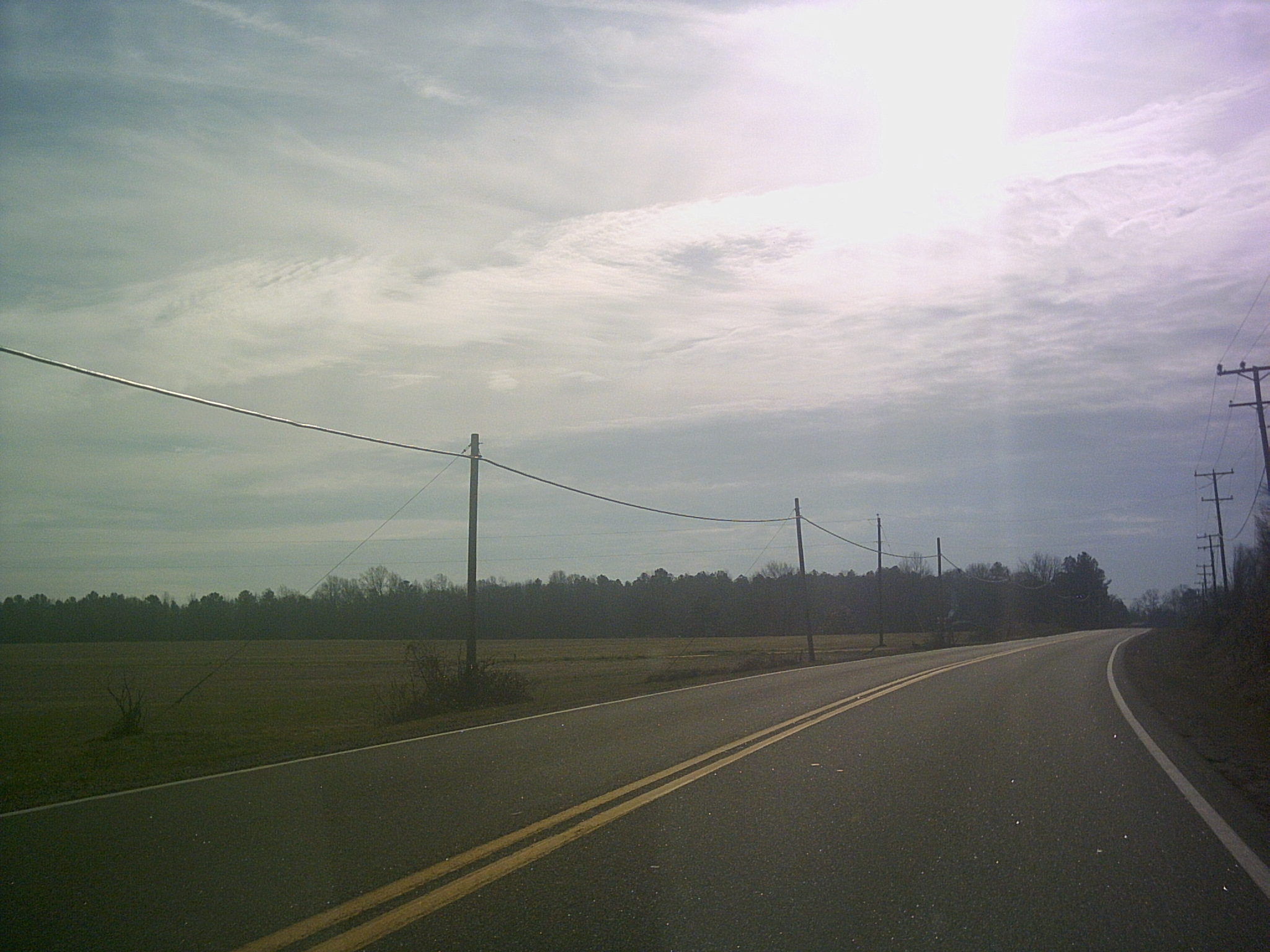
Lerty, Virginia

Lerty was an unincorporated community in Westmoreland County, in the U. S. state of Virginia. The community had a post office from approximately 1917 through 1960. "Lerty" seems to have been a remote family name of the wife of R.L. Gutridge, who the first postmater of the post office.

== Geography ==
Montross is located at 38°5′38″N 76°49′34″W (38.093965, −76.826041). According to the U.S. Census Bureau, the town has a total area of 1.0 square mile (2.6 km^{2}), all land.

== Demographics ==
Historical population
Census	Pop.	Note	%±
1950	331		—
1960	394		19.0%
1970	419		6.3%
1980	456		8.8%
1990	359		−21.3%
2000	315		−12.3%
2010	384		21.9%
2020	333		−13.3%
U.S. Decennial Census

As of the census of 2020, there were 553 people, 252 households. The population density was 536.6 people per square mile. There were 296 housing units at an average density of 283.2 per square mile. The racial makeup of the town was 74% White, 14% African American, 6% Asian, and 6% from two or more races. Hispanic or Latino of any race were 0% of the population.

There were 252 households, out of which 18% had children under the age of 18 living with them, 64.0% were married couples living together, 6% had a female householder with no spouse present, 6% had a male householder with no spouse present, and 24% were non-families. The average household size was 2.2.

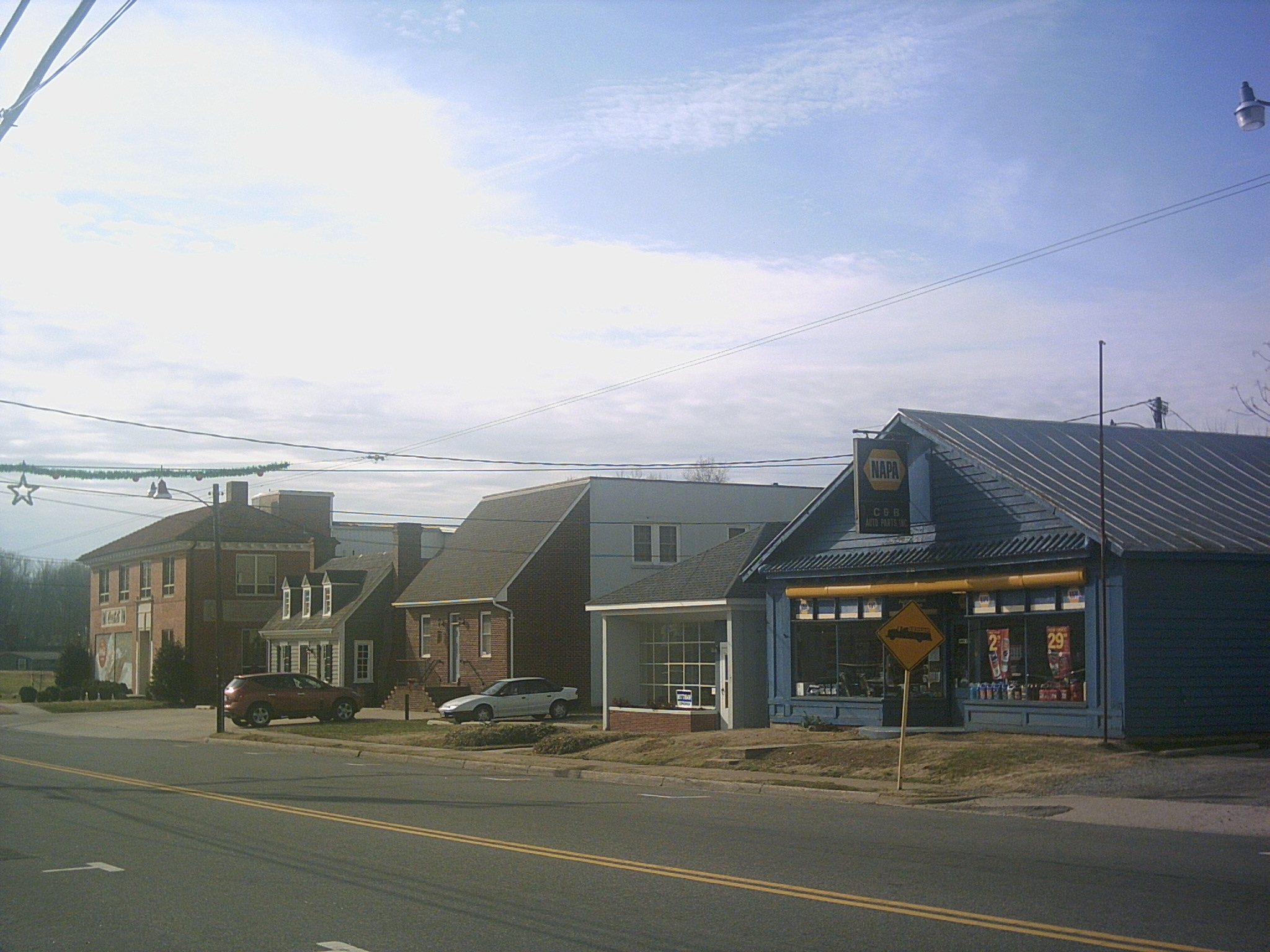
View of downtown Montross

In the town, the population is on the mature end, with 18% under the age of 18, 48% from 18 to 64, and 34% who were 65 years of age or older.

The median age was 41 years. The population is 51% those who identify and female, and 49% those who identify as male.

The median income for a household in the town was $42,500, and the median income for a family was $41,746. About 7.9% of the population were below the poverty line, including 8% of those under age 18 and 12% of those age 65 or over.

== Education ==
Montross' students are served by Westmoreland County Public Schools.

== Things to do ==
Menokin, home of Francis Lightfoot Lee, a signer of the U.S. Declaration of Independence, is a National Historic Landmark and one of the most intact standing 18th century homes in the U.S. The landscape is open daily from 7am-7pm.

Westmoreland State Park is located on the Potomac River's Northern Neck and offers opportunities for family fun. It s listed on the National Register of Historic Places and has a bathhouse, meeting area, snack bar, camp store and power-boat ramp. You'll also find a visitor center, campgrounds, camping cabins, cabins, a playground, a fishing pier, boat rentals and 6 miles of trails. Fossil collectors enjoy hunting for ancient shark teeth along the Potomac. The park grounds are open daily from dawn to dusk.

Stratford Hall: A National Historic Landmark, Stratford Hall preserves the legacy of the Lee family and its surrounding community. Established by Thomas Lee in the 1730s, Stratford Hall is one of the great houses of American history. Four generations of the Lee family passed through its stately doors including Richard Henry Lee and Francis Lightfoot Lee, the only two brothers to sign the Declaration of Independence, Revolutionary War hero "Light Horse Harry" Lee, and his son, Civil War General Robert E. Lee, who was born at Stratford Hall in 1807.

Westmoreland County Mercantile Museum: Westmoreland County Museum (WCM) founded in 1941, is the oldest museum in the Northern Neck. WCM preserves important history plus artifacts of the county and its people. Its treasures include the notable portrait of Sir William Pitt, painted by Charles Willson Peale, commissioned by the patriots of Westmoreland County in 1768, an 1898 portrait of General Robert E. Lee by Eliphalet Andrews, and a chair from George Washington's dining room. Exhibits include Native American artifacts, geology and archaeology of local sites, a furniture collection and an extensive portrait and painting collection. While visiting, stop by the Westmoreland Mercantile General Store.

George Washington Birthplace National Monument: Located in the Northern Neck of Virginia. The park encompasses 550 acres of the former Popes Creek Plantation, the American ancestral home of the Washington Family where George Washington was born. In addition to a Colonial Revival farm, burial ground, visitor center, and historic structures, the park also has picnic grounds and a public beach.

Voorhees Nature Preserve: Part of a network of conservation lands along the Rappahannock River—a major tributary of the Chesapeake Bay—the preserve provides excellent habitat for bald eagles and other wildlife.

Fall Festival: Once a year, Montross has a festival in celebration of the town. It includes parades and game stands. The event is usually held in October and is widely attended by town residents.

First Fridays: During summer months, the town hosts live music, food, and vendor booths on the first Friday of the month.

== In popular culture ==
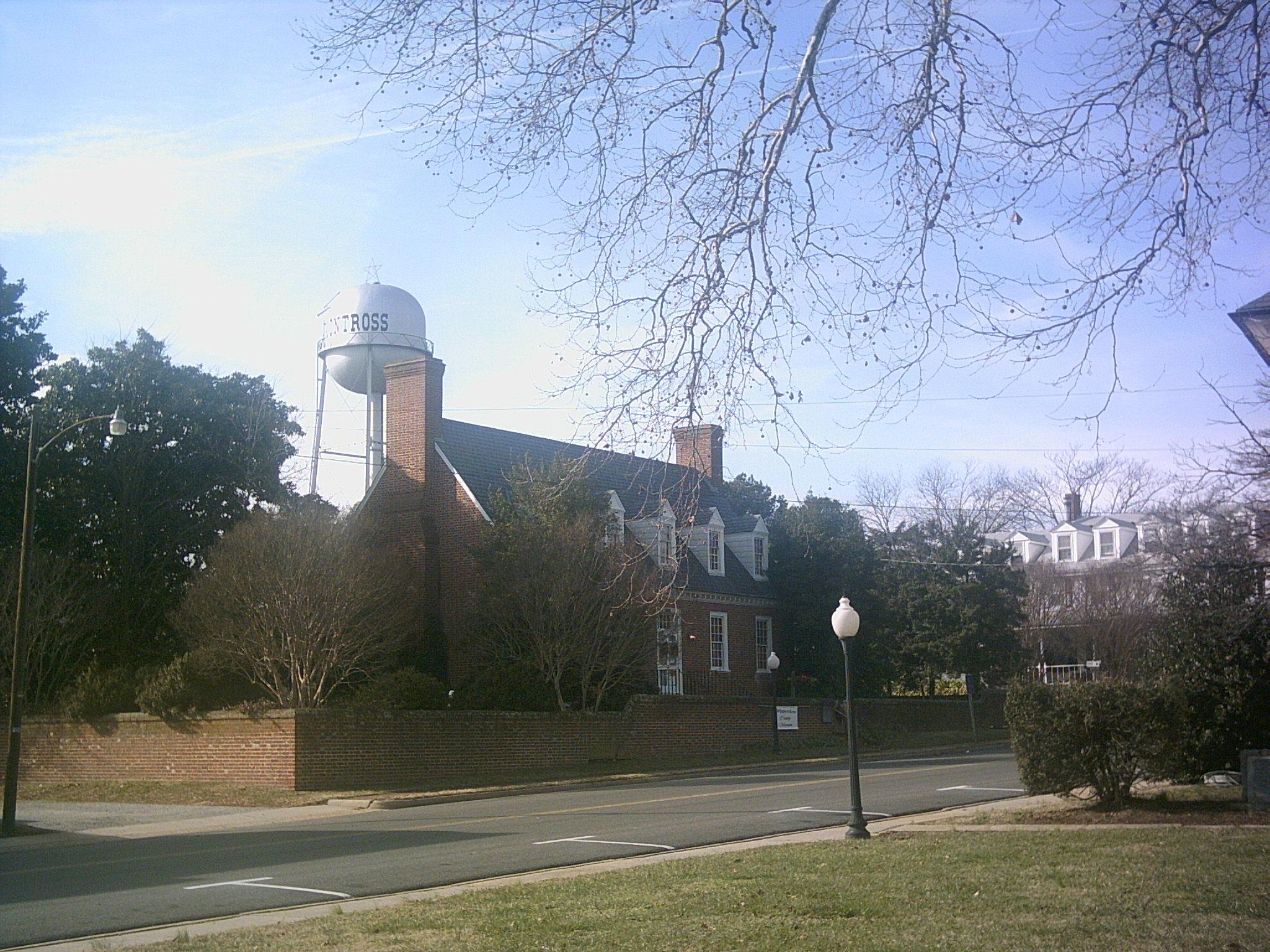
Westmoreland County Museum and water tower in downtown Montross

In 2000, Montross was on television's Late Show with David Letterman. In a segment called, "Biff Henderson's America", Biff Henderson visited the small town's museum, Bargain Shop, Sheriff's Department, the Coca-Cola Bottling Plant, and the Potomac River. He also interviewed people during his visit, jokingly asking them if they would like Biff to be mayor.

== Notable person ==
- Rob Wittman – U.S. representative, former Virginia state delegate, Westmoreland County supervisor, and mayor of Montross
