= Kinsale, Virginia =

Unincorporated community in Virginia, US

Coordinates: 38°01′46″N 76°34′51″W

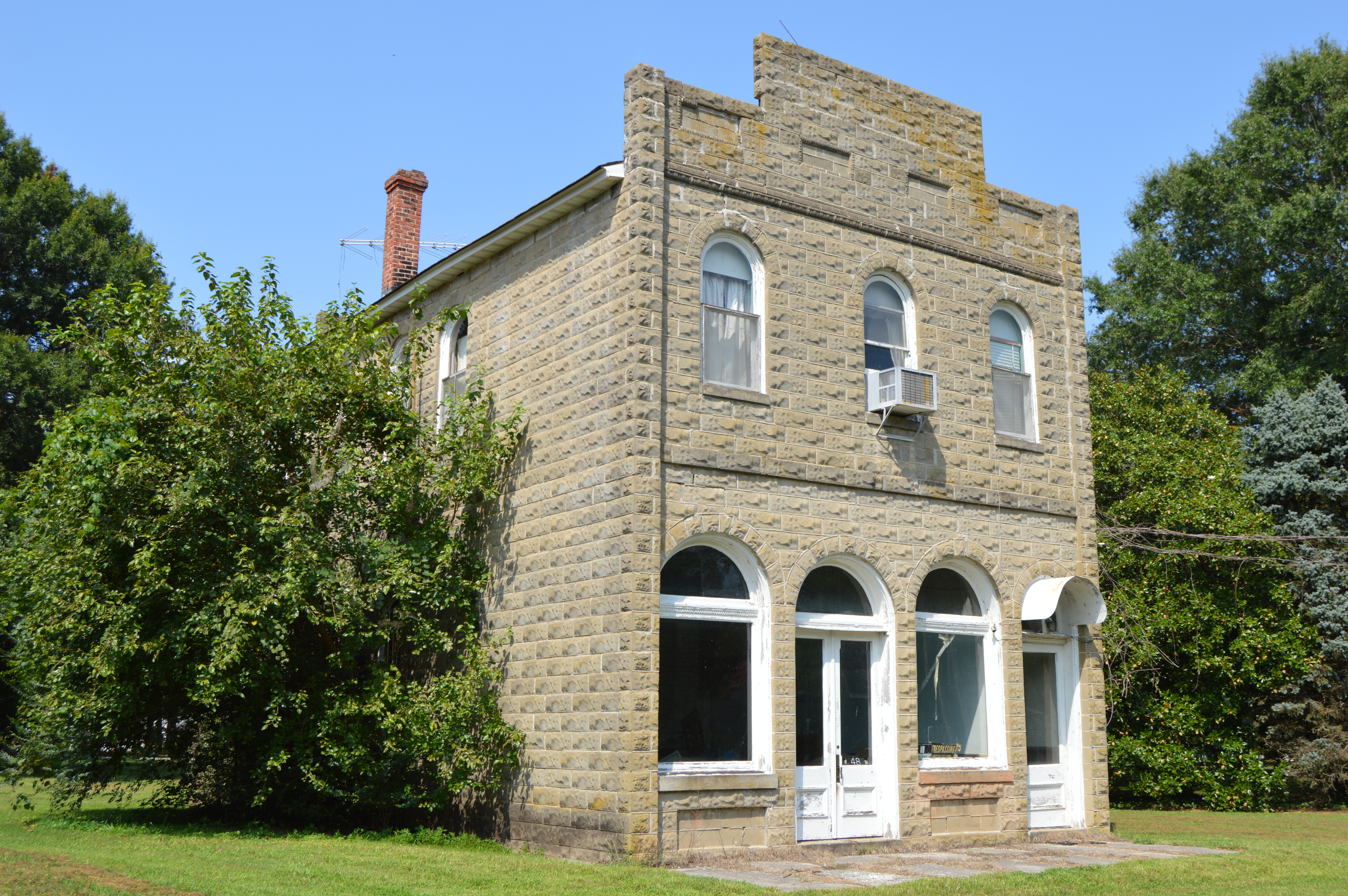
The Bank of Kinsale

Kinsale is an unincorporated community in Westmoreland County, in the U. S. state of Virginia. It was named after Kinsale, in Ireland.

Nearby is the Yeocomico Church which structure dates to 1705. During the War of 1812, the Royal Marines Battalions raided the entrance to the Yeocomico River, which concluded with the capture of four schooners at the town of Kinsale, Virginia in August, 1814.

The Kinsale Historic District was listed on the National Register of Historic Places in 2005. There is a small museum near the town commons dedicated to its history. The community is the location of the headquarters of the Bevans Oyster Company, which is a large employer in the area.

== Notable people ==
- Mike ter Maat, economist and 2024 Libertarian Party vice presidential nominee
