= Hague, Virginia =

Unincorporated community in Virginia, US

Coordinates: 38°04′20″N 76°39′04″W

Roadside scene in Hague, 2014

Hague is an unincorporated community in Westmoreland County, Virginia, United States.

The Morgan Jones 1677 Pottery Kiln and Mount Pleasant, both in Hague, are each listed on the National Register of Historic Places.

== Residents ==
- R. L. T. Beale
