= Declaration of the People of Virginia =

1676 list of complaints by Nathaniel Bacon

The Declaration of the People of Virginia, or simply the Declaration of the People, was a list of complaints issued by Nathaniel Bacon on July 30, 1676, in which he proclaimed Virginia's colonial governor, William Berkeley, to be corrupt and expressed his displeasure at what his followers regarded as unjust taxation and the government's failure to provide colonists protection from some tribes of American Indians. The presumed grievances brought about the uprising known as Bacon's Rebellion. This Rebellion was regarded as the first of the new colonies. Whether Bacon's Rebellion was serving the interest of the colonists, or the King, continues to be debated. The Declaration and the Rebellion as a whole was a long time coming and was the result of a crisis within Virginia's social, economic, and political problems.

== Eight points ==
The Declaration authored by Bacon cited eight points in its complaint against the governor:

1. Taxation (point 1): Governor Berkeley was accused of excessive taxation and having "upon specious pretenses of public works, raised great unjust taxes upon the commonalty for the advancement of private favorites and other sinister ends, but no visible effects in any measure adequate"
2. Judicial corruption (point 2): "For having abused and rendered contemptible the magistrates of justice by advancing to places of judicature scandalous and ignorant favorites"
3. Personal enrichment (point 3): Berkeley was said to be "assuming monopoly of the beaver trade"
4. Failure to protect the colonists (point 4): "For having protected, favored, and emboldened the Indians against his Majesty's loyal subjects, never contriving, requiring, or appointing any due or proper means of satisfaction for their many invasions, robberies, and murders committed upon us."
5. Ceasing the hostilities and pursuit of natives (point 5): "For having, when the army of English was just upon the track of those Indians, who now in all places burn, spoil, murder and when we might with ease have destroyed them who then were in open hostility, for then having expressly countermanded and sent back our army by passing his word for the peaceable demeanor of the said Indians".
6. Raising and framing an army (point 6): "lately, when, upon the loud outcries of blood, the assembly had, with all care, raised and framed an army for the preventing of further mischief and safeguard of this his Majesty's colony."
7. Installing a person in a position of power against the people's consent (point 7): "only by the alteration of a figure, forged a commission, by we know not what hand, not only without but even against the consent of the people, for the raising and effecting civil war and destruction, which being happily and without bloodshed prevented" "thereby calling down our forces from the defense of the frontiers and most weakly exposed places".
8. Preventing chaos within the community while ignoring the threat of the enemy (point 8): "For the prevention of civil mischief and ruin amongst ourselves while the barbarous enemy in all places did invade, murder, and spoil us, his Majesty's most faithful subjects."

Nathaniel Bacon accused Sir William Berkeley of being guilty of going against the King's interests: "we accuse Sir William Berkeley as guilty of each and every one of the same, and as one who has traitorously attempted, violated, and injured his Majesty's interest here by a loss of a great part of this his colony and many of his faithful loyal subjects".

== Accused traitors ==
The Declaration listed a number of the governor's associates said to be "his wicked and pernicious councilors, confederates, aiders, and assisters against the commonalty in these our civil commotions."

Names listed included:

- Sir Henry Chichley,
- William Claiborne Junior,
- Lt. Col. Christopher Wormeley,
- Thomas Hawkins,
- William Sherwood,
- Philip Ludwell,
- John Page, Clerke,
- Robert Beverley,
- John Cluffe, Clerke,
- Richard Lee II,
- John West,
- Thomas Ballard,
- Hubert Farrell,
- William Cole,
- Thomas Reade,
- Richard Whitacre (Whitaker),
- Matthew Kempe,
- Nicholas Spencer, and
- Joseph Bridger

Bacon made sure to shame the persons involved by mentioning the King and how the acts of those named had been tyrannical. He contended that those named had been enemies of the people of Virginia and of the King and the Crown. Bacon and his Rebellion felt that before they were to attack and cause an uprising against Sir Berkeley's administration, a treaty would be in order to give the administration a chance to surrender.

== Call for action ==
Bacon demanded that Sir William Berkeley and all persons listed turn themselves in within four days of the notice. Bacon continues with "whatsoever place, house, or ship, any of the said persons shall reside, be hid, or protected, we declare the owners, masters, or inhabitants of the said places to be confederates and traitors to the people and the estates of them is also of all the aforesaid persons to be confiscated."

Nathaniel Bacon then called on the citizens of the state to seize the people mentioned in the declaration by the command of the king.

These are therefore in his majesties name to command you forthwith to seize the persons above mentioned as Trayters [sic] to the King and Country and them to bring to Midle plantacon, and there to secure them untill further order, and in case of opposition, if you want any further assistance you are forthwith to demand itt in the name of the people in all the Counties of Virginia.

The Declaration was signed "Nathaniel Bacon, General by Consent of the people."

== See also ==
- Bacon's Laws
- Virginia Slave Codes of 1705

== Bibliography ==
- Text of the Declaration
- "Bacon's Declaration in the Name of the People 30 July 1676." American History. N.p., n.d. Web. 12 Nov. 2016.
- "Bacon's Declaration in the Name of the People 1676. (n.d.). Retrieved November 11, 2017, from constitution.org
- "Bacon's Declaration in the Name of the People 30 July 1676. (n.d.). Retrieved November 11, 2017, from let.rug.nl
- "Virginia Historical Society. (n.d.). Retrieved November 11, 2017, vahistorical.org
