= Thomas Ballard (disambiguation) =

Thomas Ballard (1630–1689) was a colonial Virginia landowner and politician.

Thomas or Tom Ballard may also refer to:

- Thomas Ballard Jr. (1654–1710), member of the Virginia House of Burgesses
- Thomas Ballard (MP for Coventry), member of Parliament for Coventry in 1301
- Thomas Ballard (fl. 1388), MP for Reigate
- Thomas Ballard (fl. 1373), MP for Wycombe
- Tom Ballard (comedian) (born 1989), Australian comedian, radio and television presenter
- Tom Ballard (climber) (1988–2019), British rock climber and alpinist

== See also ==
- Tom Bollard (1890–1920), Australian rules footballer
- Ballard (surname)
