= Nathaniel Bacon (Virginia politician) =

Virginia colonial politician (1620–1692)

Nathaniel Bacon (c. 1620 – 1692), sometimes referred to as "Bacon the Elder" was a politician in colonial Virginia. As President of the Virginia Governor's Council, Bacon served as the acting Governor of Virginia during multiple periods in the 1680s and 1690s.

== Early life and family ==
Nathaniel Bacon was born in 1619 or 1620, the only son of James Bacon and Martha Bacon. Bacon was likely born in Suffolk, England and was christened on August 29, 1620, at the St Mary's Church in Bury St Edmunds.Around 1653 or 1654 Bacon married the twice-widowed Ann Bassett Smith Jones. After her death shortly thereafter, Bacon married another widow, Elizabeth Kingsmill Tayloe in around 1656 or 1657.

Bacon's nephew and Virginia Colonist Nathaniel Bacon was named after him.

== Career ==
By 1653, Bacon had moved to Virginia Colony. He settled in Isle of Wight County and later moved to York County. In March 1656, Bacon represented York County in the Virginia House of Burgesses. By December 1656, Bacon was appointed as a member of the Virginia Governor's Council, where he served for three years. After serving as a Burgess in 1659, Bacon was re-appointed to the Governor's Council where he served as an influential member for over thirty years, from August 1660 to his death in 1692. During his time as a member of the Governor's Council, Bacon also served as auditor of the royal revenue for the colony from 1675 until 1688.

As President of the Governor's Council, Bacon served as the acting Governor of Virginia in the summer of 1684 (during the absence of Governor Francis Howard, 5th Baron Howard of Effingham), the summer of 1687 (during the absence of Howard), and from 1688 to 1690 (after Howard's departure and before the arrival of Francis Nicholson).

Because of his political career and multiple marriages, Bacon amassed significant land holdings during his adult life, including his Kings Creek Plantation which had 1,200 acres of land, over 1,775 acres in Isle of Wight and Nansemond Counties, over 300 acres in New Kent County, 3 acres on Jamestown Island, and a property in Yorktown.

=== Bacon's Rebellion ===
During Bacon's Rebellion which was led by his cousin Nathaniel Bacon, Bacon remained loyal to the crown and opposed his cousin's actions. In 1676, Bacon offered his cousin “a considerable part of his Estate” on the condition that he would end the rebellion and return to being a “good subject to his Majesty." The rebellion ended when Bacon's cousin died from dysentery in the same year.

== Death ==
Bacon died on March 16, 1692, and was buried at his residence in York County. He did not have any children, and his principal heir was his niece, Abigail Smith Burwell.
