= Henry Hartwell =

British attorney and politician

Member of the Council of State for the Colony of Virginia
- In office 1692-1695

Member of the House of Burgesses for James City, Colony of Virginia
- In office 1684-1688
- Preceded by: Thomas Clayton
- Succeeded by: William Sherwood

Personal details
- Born: circa 1649 Middle Plantation Colony of Virginia
- Died: Summer, 1699 Stepney, Middlesex County, England
- Spouse: Jane Meriwether
- Relatives: William Hartwell (brother)
- Occupation: attorney, planter, politician

Henry Hartwell (c. 1641 – summer 1699) was an English attorney who also became a planter, official, military officer and politician in the Colony of Virginia, serving as clerk of the General Court and later of the Council of State (1672-1681) (including during Bacon's Rebellion), and in both houses of the Virginia General Assembly. He represented Jamestown in the House of Burgesses (1684-1688) and served on the Council of State (1692-1695) before returning to England, where he died. Although an ally of Governor William Berkeley during the rebellion (and his brother WIlliam led the Governor's guard and was wounded during the conflict), Hartwell together with Rev. James Blair and attorney Edward Chilton later prepared a report on the colony's administration which was published as The Present State of Virginia in 1699.
