= William Carver (burgess) =

Merchant mariner, politician and rebel

Member of the House of Burgesses for Lower Norfolk County
- In office 1665-1669 Serving with Adam Thoroughgood Jr.
- Preceded by: John Knowles
- Succeeded by: Lemuel Mason

Personal details
- Born: England
- Died: early September 1676 Northampton County, Colony of Virginia
- Resting place: unknown
- Spouse: Elizabeth

William Carver (before 1640 – before September 7, 1676), was an English merchant, mariner, planter and politician who represented Lower Norfolk County in the House of Burgesses from 1665 through 1669, is best known for his participation in Bacon's Rebellion, which led to his execution in 1676.

== Early and family life ==
Probably born in Bristol, England. By the mid-1650s Carver owned a ship that engaged in trade between Bristol and London in England, and its colonies.

He married a woman named Elizabeth and had a 10-year-old son in 1659. His wife had died by 1667 since property was transferred to that now 18 year old young man without her signature. Carver probably remarried, to a woman whose name was unrecorded, but supposedly died of grief after hearing of his execution, as described below.

== Career ==
On June 15, 1659, Carver patented 500 acres of land on the South Branch of the Elizabeth River in Lower Norfolk County in the Hampton Roads area. In 1663 he renewed that patent (which also required some development of the acreage) and acquired an additional 890 acres nearby based on the people whose immigration he funded. In 1667 Carver named his 18-year-old son as manager of that property. Meanwhile, in 1663, Carver received an appointment as a local justice of the peace (which involved collective administrative duties as well as judicial responsibilities in that era).

Two years later, Lower Norfolk voters elected Carver one of the county's representatives in the House of Burgesses, and he continued in that position until 1669 (although interim elections may not have been held during the Long Assembly and he may have been removed because of legal problems discussed below). Carver served on the Committee for Propositions, and when the Second Anglo-Dutch War ended in 1667, he was appointed to a committee to ask Governor Sir William Berkeley and his Council whether enough money remained to erect a fort to protect the Hampton Roads area.

Carver also served as a tax collector for Lower Norfolk County in 1669 and 1672, and as a road overseer in 1669 and 1671. He also served as the county sheriff in 1670.

At least one biographer reading accounts of Carver's fondness for "the juice of the grape" speculates that Carver was alcoholic, which led to a decline in his social responsibilities. On July 25, 1672, Carver stabbed Thomas Gilbert to death during a dinner at which they sat next to another. Witnesses described Carver's behavior as irrational, but he was acquitted of murder when brought to trial, possibly because he could not remember anything about the incident. However, after Carver returned from the Jamestown court session, he was again arrested. Furthermore, during another legal dispute, Carver accused his adversary's wife of practicing witchcraft.

In June 1676, Carver again traveled to Jamestown while a newly-called assembly was in session. He requested a military commission from Nathaniel Bacon, who had received several commissions to lead a campaign against Native Americans who had raided settlements recently. Instead, Bacon appointed Carver and fellow merchant (and recent arrival) Giles Bland as commanders of a naval force. Governor Sir William Berkeley had retreated with his most loyal followers to the Eastern Shore of Virginia, specifically "Arlington", a plantation owned by Councillor John Custis II. Bacon's men commandeered ships near Jamestown (including the 265 ton Rebecca captained by Thomas Larimore), and Carver, Bland and several hundred men were to kidnap Berkeley. However, after arriving in Northampton County near Arlington, Carver accepted Berkeley's invitation to dine with him on September 1. The governor may have plied Carver with wine before Carver returned to his ship. The next day, the governor's supporters boarded the Rebecca and seized it, Carver and Bland, and its crew.

== Death and legacy ==
Carver and three others were convicted of treason at a court martial and hanged, likely in early September 1676, and the location of their burials is not known. In November, Carver's property was ordered confiscated and sold, and Carver was among those specifically exempted from the governor's pardon declaration issued that winter. However, Carver's son was later able to recover some of the lands that his father had patented, and in 1681 sold them. Decades later, William Craford founded a town on part of that land, which became Portsmouth, Virginia.
