= Thomas Larimore =

Thomas Larimore (fl. 1677-1706, last name occasionally Laramore, Larrimore, Laremore, or Laremoor) was a privateer and pirate active in the Caribbean and off the eastern seaboard of the American colonies. After helping suppress Bacon’s Rebellion and serving as a militia leader he turned to piracy, his activities intertwined with those of fellow pirate John Quelch.

== History ==
When Nathaniel Bacon rebelled against Virginia colonial officials in 1676, Larimore sided with the Virginia loyalists under Governor William Berkeley. He ferried troops and fought in and around Newport News in his ship Rebecca, which was captured by Bacon’s rebels then recaptured and returned to Larimore. He then used the Rebecca – with extra cannon added by the rebels – to capture the rebels’ remaining ships, helping lead the loyalists to victory.

Larimore also served as quartermaster aboard several different vessels during King William's War from 1688-1697. In 1702 he was commissioned as a privateer by Governor Joseph Dudley of Boston to sail against the French, and took at least five French ships. Dudley commissioned Larimore again in 1703, this time to lead a unit of foot soldiers to help defend Jamaica against the Spanish. His soldiers suffered from disease and went unpaid, shuffled around the Caribbean and as far north as Newfoundland before being returned to Boston that November.

Bitter and broke, Larimore threatened to take to piracy on his ship Larimore Galley. Returning to Cape Ann near Boston, a number of Quelch’s men came aboard Larimore’s ship, having dispersed on shore after leaving Quelch's Charles Galley to hide their loot. Governor Dudley’s men seized Larimore, his crew, and the remains of Quelch’s crew. Larimore was charged not with piracy but with harboring fugitives (Quelch's crew). He was sent to England for trial, but because of his service against the French and Spanish, Dudley asked officials to pardon him. By late 1706 Larimore had been returned to New England and again placed under arrest, “suspected of very ill designs and practices.”

== See also ==
- Admiralty court, the venue in which Larimore's privateering prizes were approved, and in which Larimore was later tried.
- Samuel Sewall, the judge who presided over Quelch's and Larimiore's trials, more famous for his role in the Salem Witch Trials.
