= Richard Lawrence (burgess) =

Colonial tavernkeeper, politician and rebel

Member of the House of Burgesses for James City County
- In office June 1676
- Preceded by: Edward Ramsey
- Succeeded by: Edward Hill

Personal details
- Born: England
- Died: Colony of Virginia
- Resting place: unknown
- Spouse: Dorothy
- Education: Oxford University

Richard Lawrence (before 1640 – after December 1676) was an Oxford University graduate who emigrated to the Virginia colony where after various real estate speculations, he married a wealthy widow and became a tavernkeeper in Jamestown. Lawrence became one of Nathaniel Bacon's closest confidantes during Bacon's Rebellion and briefly served in the House of Burgesses during that conflict, after which he vanished with two other men otherwise likely to have been sentenced to death for treason.

Complicating matters, another man of the same name represented Lower Norfolk County as a burgess between 1671 and 1674, and died in 1681 (and had his will admitted to probate), but no relationship between them has been established. That William Lawrence and Lemuel Mason had succeeded William Carver (who was executed during Bacon's Rebellion) and Adam Thoroughgood Jr. as burgesses representing Lower Norfolk County.

== Early life ==
Born in England, little is known about Lawrence's early life, other than that he had attended Oxford University. His wife had died by 1676, and some of his detractors later claimed that Lawrence was an atheist and had an enslaved Black woman as a concubine.

== Career ==
A charismatic man, Lawrence first appeared in colonial Virginia records on September 10, 1662, when he appeared before the justices of the peace for Lancaster County and obtained headrights for several people whom he had brought to the colony, including his wife Dorothy, his sister Patience and four males who may have been servants. In 1663 and 1664, Lawrence patented thousands of acres in the Rappahannock River watershed, in what was then Rappahannock County, Virginia, including acreage under Native American settlements and at the head of Dragon Swamp (which Bacon's follower's would later invade and where Lawrence would ultimately disappear). Thus Lawrence owned (and was supposed to develop) land in the Middle Peninsula and slightly to the north in Lancaster County. Nonetheless, by 1667 he had moved south to the colony's capital, Jamestown and in 1668 the colony's surveyor, Edmund Scarborough I, made Lawrence responsible for reviewing all survey plants sent to that office before they became part of a patent. Lawrence continued as a surveyor until July 1672, and one of his authorized surveys was of "Paradise" plantation of Councillor Richard Lee II in Gloucester County.

During the 1660s and 1670s, Lawrence made court appearances in Northumberland and Surry County, often seeking to recover debts, well as before the General Court during sessions of the House of Burgesses. However, in October 1672 he accused the General Court clerk, Richard Auborne, of causing the death of John Senior. Although all were Jamestown residents, the underlying facts are unknown, and no action was taken, unless the underlying lawsuit was in James City court, in which case the General Court overturned the James City County Court decision. Over the next months later, the General Court issued several decisions against Lawrence's economic interests. First, it reduced the indenture term of one of Lawrence's servants, John Bustone. In April 1674, the General Court fined Lawrence for entertaining some of Governor Berkeley's servants, and ordered him to pay part of the cost for constructing a brick fort at Jamestown. Furthermore, when three of Lawrence's servants stole a shallop boat and wrecked it, only two of them had their indentures extended. In 1675 the General Court freed an apprentice carpenter whom Lawrence had assigned to Arnold Cassina to pay a debt. Then Lawrence posted bail for Giles Bland, a young immigrant who came to the colony to settle debts owed his late father by his late uncle Theodorick Bland of Westover, and who had insulted Thomas Ludwell, Governor Berkeley ally and the colony's secretary. When Bland fled before trial, the colony's attorney general, William Sherwood, sued Lawrence to recover the bail money.

By the time Bacon's Rebellion began in 1676, Lawrence was a widower and emerged as one of Nathaniel Bacon's leading advisors and staunchest supporters. Bacon lived next door to another of Bacon's supporters (and a former favorite of Governor Berkeley) William Drummond. James City County voters elected him as their representative in the House of Burgesses for the June 1676 session. Thus, when Bacon (who had been elected as one of Henrico County's burgesseses nothwithstanding Governor Berkeley's condemnation of him) secretly landed at Jamestown in June 1676, he met with Lawrence, and Governey Berkeley had Lawrence's tavern searched while attempting to capture Bacon. When Bacon and his followers recaptured Jamestown in September 1676 and decided to set the capital aflame, Lawrence reportedly set fire to his own house, and some claimed that he also set the church and state house (and the house of William Sherwood's orphaned stepson Richard James II) aflame.

After Nathaniel Bacon died of fever and loyalist forces defeated or captured most of his forces, Lawrence and two men were last seen walking in the snow into Native American land in New Kent County. Because Governor Berkeley considered Lawrence guilty of treason, he specifically exempted him from the general pardon that King Charles' emissaries had advised him to issue. In 1677, an inventory was made of his estate and Jamestown's Major William White was ordered to recover what he could. Crown agents were still trying to recover revenue from Lawrences' debtors as late as 1686. Furthermore, people who had purchased property from Lawrence had difficulty obtaining clean title.
