= Herbert Jeffreys =

Herbert Jeffreys may refer to:

- Herbert Jeffreys (English Army officer) (1620–1678), English royalist who became lieutenant governor of the Virginia colony after Bacon's Rebellion
- Herb Jeffries (1913–2014), American singer and actor
