= Bacon's Laws =

Set of Virginian reform measures

Bacon's Laws were a series of reform measures that were passed in the colonial assembly of Virginia after Nathaniel Bacon invaded Jamestown on June 23, 1676, and had forced royal Governor William Berkeley and the Assembly to grant him a commission to fight the Indians. The laws gave white male settlers a voice in setting local taxes; forbade officeholders from demanding additional fees for performing the duties of the office; restricted the number of offices an individual man could hold; required officeholders to be Virginia-born or resident in the colony for three years; and restored voting rights to all freemen. The aim of the reforms was to put more power in the hands of local men and to limit the practice of a small number of privileged outsiders monopolizing offices and enriching themselves at the expense of Virginians.

== See also ==
- Treaty of 1677
- Virginia Slave Codes of 1705
