= Bacon's Rebellion =

1675–1676 Virginia rebellion against the colonial government

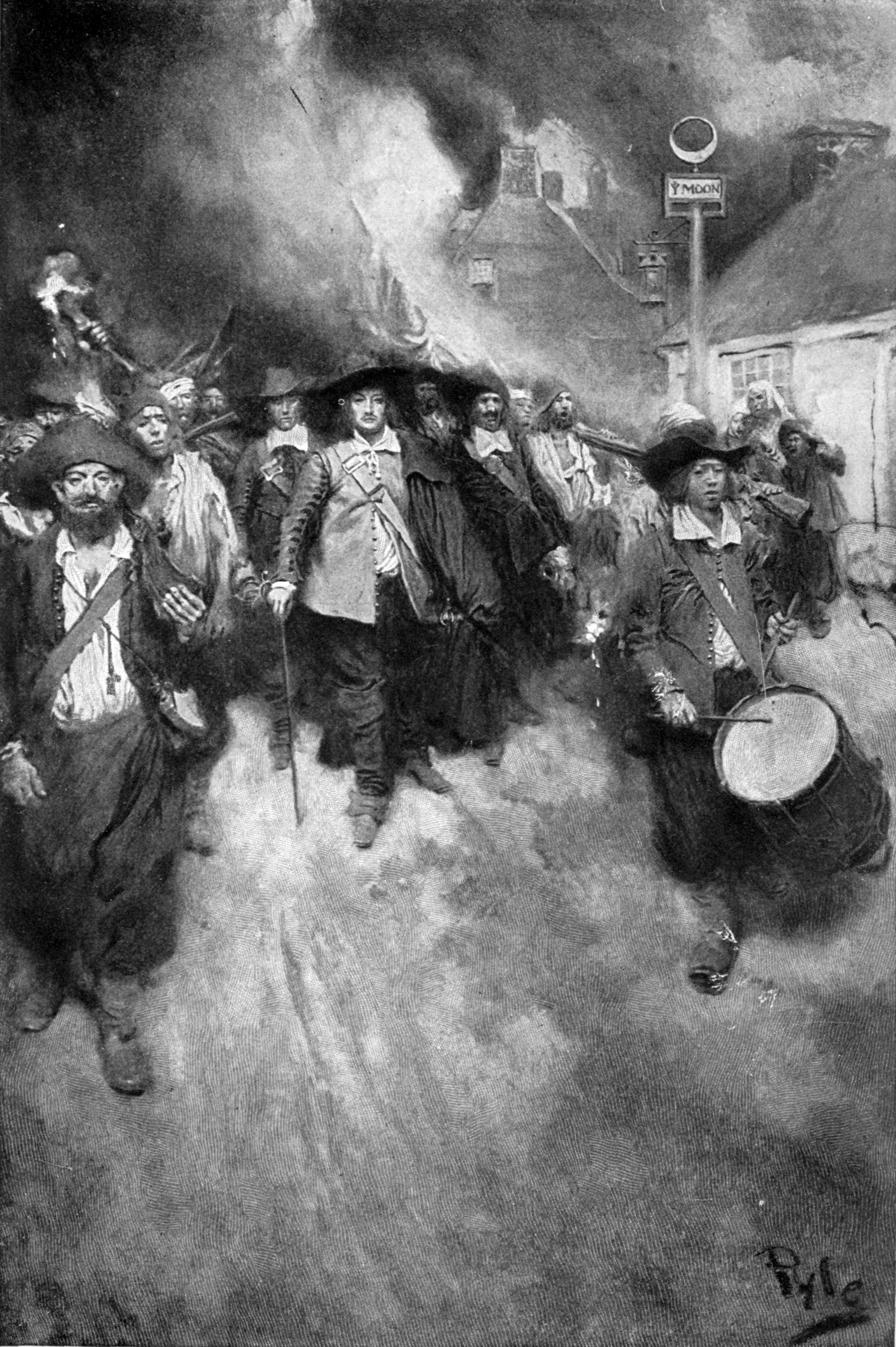
- The Burning of Jamestown by Howard Pyle
- Date: 1676–1677
- Location: Jamestown, Colony of Virginia, English (British) America
- Goals: Change in Virginia's American Indian-frontier policy
- Methods: Demonstrations, vigilantes
- Result: Colonial government victory: Failure of the rebellion; Mass executions of the rebellion's leaders; Berkeley recalled to England

Parties
Virginia colonists, indentured servants and slaves	Colony of Virginia

Lead figures
Nathaniel Bacon # John Ingram (executed)	William Berkeley # Herbert Jeffreys; King Charles II

Number
300–500	200

Casualties and losses
25 executed after the rebellion	Unknown
- Hundreds of Occaneechi and Pamunkey killed by rebels in massacres 100+ Settlers killed in American Indian raids and massacres

Bacon's Rebellion was an armed rebellion by Virginia settlers and their indentured servants and slaves, that took place from 1676 to 1677. It was led by Nathaniel Bacon against Colonial Governor William Berkeley, after Berkeley refused Bacon's request to drive American Indians out of Virginia. Thousands of Virginians from all classes (including those in indentured servitude and slavery) and races revolted against Berkeley, chasing him out from Jamestown and ultimately torching the settlement. The rebellion was first suppressed by a few armed English merchant ships from London whose captains sided with Governor Berkeley and the English loyalists, against the rebellious English settlers of Virginia, and their servitude/enslaved allies.

Government forces led by Herbert Jeffreys arrived soon after and spent several years defeating pockets of resistance and reforming the colonial government to be once more under direct Crown control. While the rebels did not succeed in their goal of driving the American Indians out from Virginia, their rebellion did result in Berkeley being recalled to England, where he died shortly thereafter.

Bacon's rebellion was the first rebellion in the British Thirteen colonies and North American colonies overall, in which discontented frontiersmen colonists took part. A somewhat similar uprising in Maryland involving John Coode and Josias Fendall took place in 1689. The alliance between European indentured servants and Black Africans (a mix of indentured, enslaved, and Free Negroes) under the English settlers of Virginia, had disturbed the European colonial upper class. They responded by hardening the racial caste of slavery in an attempt to divide the two races (European servants and black African slaves), in order to prevent subsequent united uprisings against them, with the passage of the Virginia Slave Codes of 1705.

== Prelude ==
Starting in the 1650s, when high tobacco prices encouraged both tobacco planting and immigration, colonists began cutting forests as well as trying to farm tobacco on land already cleared by Native Americans. Whereas decades earlier, Native Americans had been able to trade foodstuffs which they had grown and captured for trade goods, colonists had learned to farm grain and raise livestock for themselves; furs (caught and prepared by natives or frontiersmen) became the new primary trade good. Tensions arose because native croplands were not only attractive to the colonists' generally free-roving pigs (which damaged their crops), but easily switched to tobacco. Because colonists' farming methods drained fields of nutrients (both because of erosion and because fertilization was rarely practiced or effective for more than another century), new fields were constantly sought. Furthermore, more emigrants were surviving their indentures and thus wanted to establish themselves with their new skills as tobacco farmers. In Virginia's Northern Neck (a relatively undeveloped area in the watersheds of the Rappahannock River and Potomac Rivers between cleared and farmed land in southeastern Virginia and cleared and farmed land in eastern Maryland), rather than rent farmland from their former employers, freed indentured servants and other European immigrants began clearing and squatting on land that the Crown had reserved for Native Americans since 1634. However, with the Restoration of the English monarchy following the English Civil War, the rate of emigration from England dropped as the internal conflict declined. Between the First Anglo-Dutch War and the Second Anglo-Dutch War, the Crown adopted Navigation Acts, in particular a new rule that tobacco grown in the colonies could be sold only to English merchants and shipped to England on English ships. Since much colonial tobacco was of low quality and usually sold to Dutch traders or to the Continental market, English merchants had an oversupply of tobacco by the mid-1600s, and its price plummeted. Thus, while the Dutch had paid three pence per pound for tobacco and a small planter could grow 1,000 pounds in a year, English traders would pay only a half penny per pound or less.

Virginia's governor, William Berkeley, had taken office and sailed to the colony shortly before the English Civil War began, and remained in office or with significant power for about 35 years. Berkeley had traveled back to England to fight (unsuccessfully) for King Charles before returning to the colony in 1645 after Natives had massacred settlers in 1644. He led military forces which captured the chief Opechancanough and suppressed the revolt. Berkeley also had a royal monopoly of the important beaver fur trade and charged fur traders in the interior a license fee for bringing furs which they or Native Americans gathered and which the traders then sold to Berkeley's company. Berkeley grew unpopular after the Dutch were defeated, in part because the tobacco boom had ended, as well as because of the conflict and more personal reasons. Like King Charles, Berkeley refused to call for legislative elections for more than a decade during the English Civil Wars (during part of which Puritan-leaning Richard Bennett, Edward Digges and Samuel Mathews had replaced him as the colony's chief executive during the "Long Assembly"). He also issued large land grants to favorites (of 2,000, 10,000 or even 30,000 acres) and was extremely wealthy compared to small planters (owning Green Spring Plantation outside Jamestown, as well as 5 houses in the colonial capital which he mostly rented out, 400 cattle and 60 horses, as well as several hundred sheep, valuable household silver and nearly a thousand pounds sterling worth of grain in storage). Berkeley's favorites often commanded the local militia in various counties, as well as charging quitrents to smaller farmers who cleared and farmed the land on their vast estates. In 1662 Governor Berkeley warned English officials that the low tobacco prices did not even cover freight and customs charges, much less provide a subsistence income for small farmers, who grew discontent, and in 1667 several weather events caused the tobacco crop to fail. Nonetheless, after the Restoration of the monarchy, the king granted English-based favorites the Northern Neck Proprietary and the right to 11 years' worth of quitrents in arrears (which seemed like additional taxes). Discontent had become widespread by 1670, when most landless taxpayers lost the right to vote for representatives in the House of Burgesses. One set of aggrieved petitioners met at Lawne's Creek parish church across from Jamestown in December 1673, and in 1674 two rebellions in Virginia failed for want of leaders.

Meanwhile, Susquehannock peoples from Pennsylvania and northern Maryland had been displaced by the peoples aligned with the Iroquois Confederation and moved south into Maryland (where they were initially welcomed) and Virginia. Secocowon (then known as Chicacoan), Doeg, Patawomeck and Rappahannock natives began moving into the Northern Neck region as they were displaced from Maryland as well as rapidly settling areas of eastern Virginia, and joined local tribes in defending their land and resources. In June 1666, Governor Berkeley told General Robert Smith of Rappahanock County that Native Americans in the colony's northern part could be destroyed, in order to provide a "great Terror and Example and Instruction to all other Indians", and that an expedition against them could be funded by enslaving the women and children and selling them outside the colony. Allowing enslavement of Native Americans (incorrectly called "Indians") for damages done to frontiersman had been permitted by the General Assembly in the case of John Powell of Northumberland County. Thus, soon colonists declared war on the nearby natives. By 1669, colonists had patented the land on the west of the Potomac as far north as My Lord's Island (now Theodore Roosevelt Island in Washington, D.C.). By 1670, they had driven most of the Doeg out of the Virginia colony and into Maryland, apart from those living beside the Nanzatico/Portobago in Caroline County, Virginia.

== Motives ==
Bacon's rebellion was motivated by both class and ethnic conflict.

On the one hand, the Rebellion featured a coalition of both black and white laborers, including women, against the Virginia aristocracy represented by Governor Berkeley.

At the same time, the primary policy disagreement between Bacon and Berkeley was in how to handle the Native American population, with Bacon favoring harsher measures. Berkeley believed that it would be useful to keep some as subjects, stating, "I would have preserved those Indians that I knew were hoeurly at our mercy to have beene our spies and intelligence to find out the more bloudy Ennimies", whereas Bacon found this approach too compassionate, stating, "Our Design [is] ... to ruin and extirpate all Indians in General."

== Rebellion ==
=== Native American raids ===
In July 1675, Doeg Indians in Stafford County, Virginia, killed two settlers and destroyed fields of corn and cattle. The Stafford County militia tracked down the raiders, killing 10 Doeg in a cabin. Meanwhile, another militia, led by Colonel Mason and Captain George Brent, attacked a nearby cabin of the friendly Susquehannock tribe and killed 14 of them. The attack ceased only when someone from the cabin managed to escape and confront Mason, telling him that they were not Doegs. On August 31, Virginia Governor William Berkeley proclaimed that the Susquehannock had been involved in the Stafford County attack with the Doeg. On September 26, 1,000 members of Maryland militia led by Major Thomas Trueman marched to the Susquehannock stronghold in Maryland. They were soon joined by Virginia militia led by Col. John Washington and Col. Isaac Allerton Jr. Trueman invited five Susquehannock chiefs to a parley. After the chiefs denied responsibility for the July attacks in Stafford County despite witnesses having noticed Susquehannocks wearing clothing of some murdered settlers, they were killed without trial and despite the parley promises as well as a medal of Lord Baltimore and paper pledge from a former Maryland governor produced by one of the chiefs. Although the tribesmen in the fort continued to resist despite their leaders' unexplained disappearance, many ultimately managed to escape with their wives and children. Maryland authorities impeached Major Trueman, and Governor Berkeley expressed outrage when he heard about the massacre.

In January 1676, Susquehannocks retaliated by attacking plantations, killing 60 settlers in Maryland and a further 36 in Virginia. Other tribes joined in, killing settlers, burning houses and fields and slaughtering livestock as far south as the James and York River watersheds.

=== Berkeley's forts and Bacon's raiders ===
After raids in Virginia in February 1676, Berkeley initially called up the Virginia militia under Sir Henry Chicheley and Col. Goodrich to pursue the raiders but soon recalled that expedition and decided upon a defensive war. The House of Burgesses approved of Berkeley's plan to build and staff eight forts along the frontier with 500 men, provided for the enlistment of friendly natives, and prohibited selling firearms to "savages". When no militia deaths were reported in April and May, Berkeley proclaimed his plan a success, but Bacon's people complained that garrisons could not pursue raiders without the governor's express permission, and meanwhile outlying plantations were burned, livestock stolen, and settlers killed or taken captive. Frontier planters demanded the right to defend themselves. Bacon later attributed these actions to Berkeley's desire not to impede the beaver fur trade, but historians also note that militia were often unwilling to distinguish between friendly and unfriendly natives. Upset at Governor Berkeley's refusal to retaliate against the Native Americans' raids, farmers in Charles City County gathered near Merchant's Hope on the James River, the scene of a massacre in 1622 upon hearing rumors of a new raiding party. Nathaniel Bacon arrived with a quantity of brandy; after it was distributed, he was elected leader.

Against Berkeley's previous order, and as Bacon sought a commission to go and attack Natives, his armed militiamen crossed the Chickahominy River into New Kent County nominally seeking the Susquehannock warriors responsible for recent raids and so traveled first toward the Pamunkey lands, only to find the people had fled into Dragon Swamp. They then continued westward toward the Seneca Trail, a travel and trading path along the Appalachian Mountains. Governor Berkeley was furious that Bacon's militia had driven the Pamunkeys into hiding and declared the action illegal and rebellious, notwithstanding Bacon's letter ordering payment of money he owed the governor and reiterating that he had no evil intentions against the government nor him. However, not finding Susquehannocks, Bacon's militiamen turned their back upon settlements and struck south until they came to the Roanoke River and the Occaneechi people in May.

After convincing Occaneechi warriors (and their Mannikin and Annalecton allies) to leave their villages and attack the Susquehannock to the west, Bacon and his men refused to pay for those services but instead demanded provisions and beaver pelts. Not receiving them, they murdered the Occaneechi chief and most of the Occaneechi men, women, and children, which ranged from 100 to 400 people, remaining at the villages, then plundered their larders before proceeding eastward back toward Jamestown. Meanwhile, Berkeley had gathered about 300 men and led them to the falls of the James River (modern day Richmond), but too late to intercept Bacon's forces. So, he issued another proclamation declaring Bacon and his followers as unlawful, mutinous and rebellious, and his wife issued her own proclamation that Bacon's promises to provide for his follower's wives and children only promoted vain hopes. Lady Berkeley declared that Bacon owed his trading partner William Byrd I 400 pounds sterling and his cousin Nathaniel Bacon Sr. 200 pounds sterling and that his own father had refused to honor his bills of exchange.

=== Returning to Jamestown ===
Upon returning to their lands in Henrico County, Bacon's faction discovered that Berkeley had called for new elections to the House of Burgesses to better address the Native American raids and other matters. Ignoring the sheriff's reading of Berkeley's proclamation against Bacon, voters elected Bacon and his friend Capt. James Crews to represent them in the House of Burgesses. However, when Bacon and 40 of his armed followers attempted to dock their sloop at Jamestown, they were fired on by the fort, and so disembarked under cover of darkness to consult with followers Richard Lawrence and William Drummond at a tavern. However, he was discovered returning to his sloop, chased upriver, and forced to surrender to Capt. Thomas Gardiner of the warship Adam and Eve. Upon being taken to the Governor, Bacon behaved as a gentleman and was granted leniency—parole upon signing a paper promising to refrain from further disobedience to the government, then allowed to plead his submission before the Governor's Council.

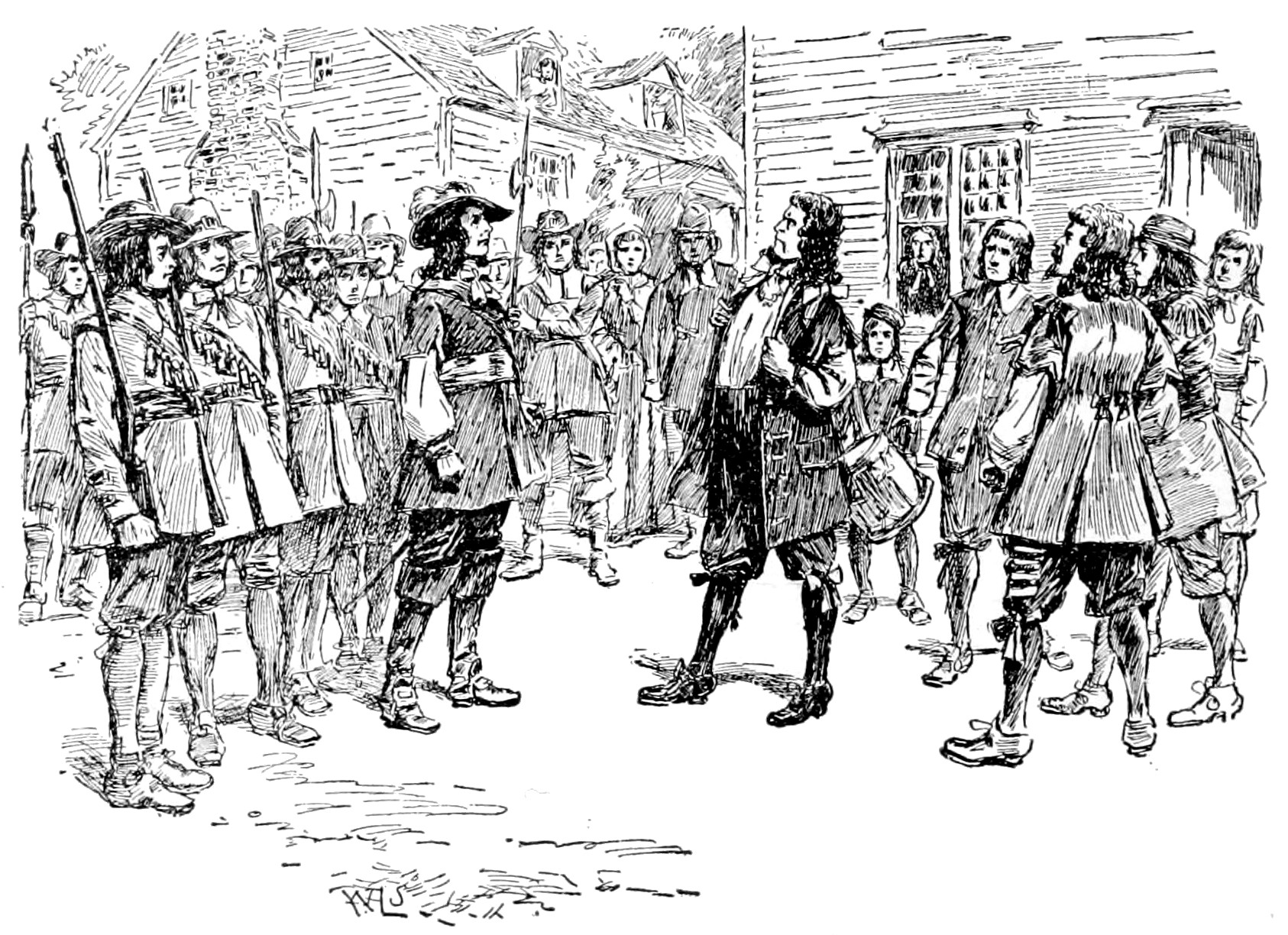
Governor Berkeley baring his chest for Bacon to shoot after refusing him a commission (1895 engraving)

Despite most new members being sympathetic to Bacon's grievances, Governor Berkeley at first exerted control over the newly elected House of Burgesses. Berkeley first insisted upon the legislature taking care of Indian business, but a debate as to whether the House would ask for two Councillors to sit with the committee on Indian Affairs never came to a vote, and the Queen of the Pamunkeys demanded compensation for the former war in which her husband had been killed assisting the English as a precondition to furnishing warriors in this conflict, although ultimately the burgesses authorized an army of 1000 men. The recomposed House of Burgesses ultimately enacted a number of sweeping reforms, known as Bacon's Laws discussed below. However, by this time Bacon had escaped Jamestown, telling Berkeley that his own wife was ill, but soon placing himself at the head of a volunteer army in Henrico County, where natives had renewed raids and killed 8 settlers, including wiping out families.

Bacon returned to Jamestown with hundreds of enraged followers demanding "no levies" (meaning no additional taxes nor military conscription). Bacon demanded a military commission to lead forces against the Native Americans, as well as blank commissions for his officers. Governor Berkeley, however, initially refused to yield to the pressure, rushing out to meet Bacon in the street and declaring him a traitor. When Bacon had his men take aim at Berkeley, he responded by "baring his breast" and told Bacon to shoot him. Seeing that the governor would not be moved, Bacon then had his men take aim at the burgesses viewing the street spectacle from the windows of nearby houses. When the burgesses invited Bacon into their Long Room, the governor yielded and signed the military commissions, as well as wrote the King justifying Bacon's conduct. The assembly in Bacon's absence had also rushed through "Bacon's Laws", possibly drafted by Lawrence and Drummond, or by Thomas Blayton (whom Edward Hill later called "Bacon's great engine" in the assembly). Although repealed by the burgesses in the 1677 session, they limited the governor's powers, set certain fees for governmental actions, made it illegal for one person to hold more than one important county office at one time (the offices being sheriff, clerk of court, surveyor and escheator) and restored suffrage to landless freemen (including in taxes levied by county courts and vestries).

=== Rival recruiting attempts and the "Declaration of the People" ===
In late July, Bacon completed preparations for his Indian campaign, including enlisting officers and armed bands from many counties, which were to meet at the falls of the James River. Bacon addressed seven hundred gathered horse and six hundred gathered foot troops, took the oath of allegiance and expected to march the next day, only to learn that Philip Ludwell and Robert Beverley were recruiting other troops on behalf of Governor Berkeley in Gloucester County to their rear, alleging that Bacon's commission was illegal because it had been procured by force, but the troops refused to gather for the governor upon learning they were to oppose the popular hero Bacon. On July 30, 1676, Bacon and his army issued the "Declaration of the People". The declaration criticized Berkeley's administration in detail. It leveled several accusations against Berkeley:

1. that "upon specious pretense of public works [he] raised great unjust taxes upon the commonality";
2. that he advanced favorites to high public offices;
3. that he monopolized the beaver trade with the Native Americans;
4. that he was pro-Native American.

Berkeley then followed Robert Beverley's advice and fled across Chesapeake Bay to Accomack County on Virginia's Eastern Shore. Chicheley promised to meet him shortly thereafter, but was captured. Bacon and his followers established a camp at Middle Plantation (modern Williamsburg) and issued a proclamation declaring Berkeley, Chicheley, Ludwell, Beverley and others traitors, as well as threatened to confiscate their estates unless they surrendered within four days. Bacon also summoned all the leading planters to a conference. Seventy assembled and 69 took three oaths: (1) that they would join with him against the Natives, (2) that they would arrest anyone trying to raise troops against him, and (3) (with demurrers) that they would oppose any English troops sent to Virginia until Bacon could plead his case before the King. Among the oath's signers were burgesses or councillors Thomas Swan, John Page, Philip Lightfoot and Thomas Ballard. Meanwhile, Bacon's father, Thomas Bacon, was pleading with the King to pardon his son, presenting "The Virginians' Plea".

Bacon then led his army through upper Gloucester and Middlesex Counties against the Pamunkey, finding a village in the swamps and capturing 45 prisoners (although the queen of the Pamunkeys escaped) as well as stores of wampum, skins, fur and English goods. Meanwhile, on August 1, Bacon's followers Giles Bland and William Carver captured a ship Rebecca commanded by Captain Larrimore and refitted her with guns, although two other ships escaped. Bland and Carver and 250 men with three ships then attempted to block the mouth of the James River, but ended up anchoring off Accomac, where Captain Larrimore sent a message to Governor Berkeley about serving with his crew under duress, so Philip Ludwell and two boats of soldiers sailed out and recaptured the ship. Berkeley then embarked 200 men on two ships and six or seven sloops and returned to the Western Shore, sailing up the James River toward Jamestown, where Bacon's garrison fled without firing a shot.

=== Burning of Jamestown, further raids, courts martial and Bacon's death ===
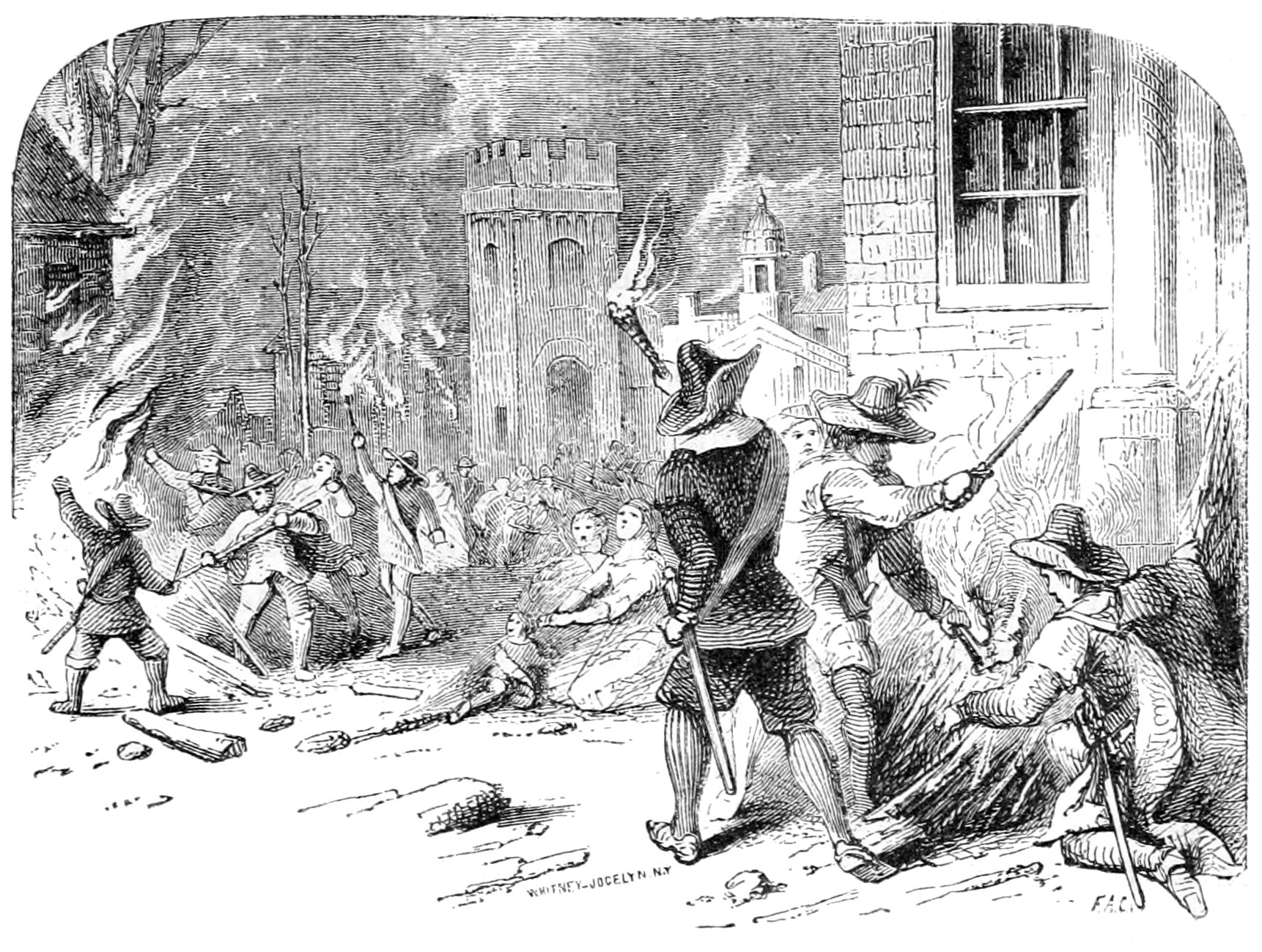
A 19th-century engraving depicting the burning of Jamestown

When Bacon's forces again reached Jamestown, it seemed impregnable, approachable only via a narrow isthmus defended by three heavy guns. Nonetheless, Bacon ordered a crude fortification constructed at the end of the isthmus, and when Berkeley's forces fired on the crude structure, sent out parties of horse troops to gather the wives of some of the governor's supporters. Thus, Elizabeth Page, Angelica Bray, Anna Ballard, Frances Thorpe and Elizabeth Bacon (wife of his senior cousin) were placed on the ramparts together with some Native American prisoners, to be endangered should firing resume. On September 15, some of Berkeley's troops sallied out, but without success, so Berkeley's Councillors advised abandoning the town. They spiked the guns, took stores aboard vessels and slipped down the river at night. Bacon's forces thus retook the town. However, Bacon also learned that his former follower Giles Brent had raised an army in the northern counties and was marching south to attack Bacon and his men. Thus, Bacon, Lawrence, Drummond and others decided to torch Jamestown, the colony's capital, on September 19.

After Bacon's followers torched the capital and left their encampment at Berkeley's Green Spring Plantation outside Jamestown, the main body traveled east to Yorktown. They then crossed the York River and encamped in Gloucester County at Warner Hall, home of the speaker of the House of Burgesses, Augustine Warner Jr. However, the Gloucester troops balked at further oaths. This disappointed Bacon, so he arrested Rev. James Wadding, who had tried to dissuade the people from subscribing. Bacon also set up courts martial to try some of this opponents, or exchange them for Carver and Bland, but only executed one deserter. Bacon also sent Captain George Farlow (formerly one of Cromwell's men) and 40 soldiers to capture Governor Berkeley at the plantation of council member John Custis in Accomack County on Virginia's Eastern Shore, but the raid failed, and Farloe was captured and hanged. Nor was a manifesto to the people of the Eastern Shore effective. Thus, Bacon issued orders that the estates of the governor and his friends be ransacked to supply his army. Taking cattle, sheep, hogs, Indian corn and household furnishings, Bacon's soldiers seemed to plunder both friend and foe, eroding his support. Bacon made his final headquarters at the house of Major Thomas Pate, in Gloucester County a few miles east of West Point, but fell ill of dysentery and after calling in Rev. Wadding for last rites, died on October 26, 1676. His body was never found; upon being exhumed on Berkeley's orders, the casket contained only stones.

== Suppression ==
Bacon and his rebels never encountered a Crown force consisting of 1,000 English Army troops led by Colonel Herbert Jeffreys transported by a Royal Navy squadron under the command of Thomas Larimore sent to aid Berkeley. Neither Lawrence nor Drummond had military experience, and Giles Bland who had such experience was already Berkeley's prisoner, having been captured along with Carver during the failed kidnapping attempt. Thus, the remaining rebels elected John Ingram, Bacon's second in command but a saddler by trade, as their leader. The other leaders were General Colonel Langston, Colonel Miller, Captain Lostage, and Captain Bryant. However, they faced daunting problems in feeding their men, as well as the militarily strategic need to cover hundreds of thousands of acres of land with many vulnerable areas.

The rebellion did not last long after that. Ingram kept his main force at the head of the York River, with small garrisons at strategic points—including Governor Berkeley's residence at Green Spring and Major Arthur Allen's across the James River (at what came to be called Bacon's Castle though Bacon had never lived there), as well as Colonel West's house near West Point, Councillor Bacon's house at King's Creek and Yorktown (both on the York River) as well as Col. John Washington's house in Westmoreland County to the north. Berkeley launched a series of successful amphibious attacks across the Chesapeake Bay and defeated the small pockets of insurgents spread across Tidewater Virginia. Major Beverley captured Captain Thomas Hansford and his Yorktown garrison, then returned to capture Major Edmund Cheesemen and Capt. Thomas Wilford.

However, Berkeley's forces also suffered losses. A planned surprise raid on the York River garrison at King's Creek ended with the death of its leader, Capt. Hubert Farril. Major Lawrence Smith had gathered loyalists in Gloucester county, but when they faced Ingram's forces, Major Bristow offered single combat in the medieval style, and the loyalists' rank and file laid down their arms and went home. Another large force gathered in Middlesex County but dispersed after Ingram sent out Gregory Wakelett and a body of horse troops. Thus, Berkeley's plan to close in on Ingram from the south of the York River, while other loyalists attacked from the north and east failed miserably.

In November 1676, the Royal Navy arrived. Thomas Grantham, captain of the ship Concord cruised the York River, despite pleas from Lawrence about the people having been grievously oppressed and requests to remain neutral. Grantham tried to persuade Berkeley to use meekness, which Berkeley soon used to good effect, but insisted that the pardons not be allowed to Lawrence and Drummond. Grantham then went up the York River to the Pate house at West Point, and used cunning and force to disarm the rebels there. Ingram yielded the West Point garrison with 300 men, four great guns and many small arms, then Grantham tricked his way into the rebel garrison at John West's house with a barrel of brandy and promises of pardon. However, after surrendering the post with 3 cannon, 500 muskets and fowling pieces and 1000 pounds of bullets, and once they were safely in the hold, he turned the ship's guns on them and disarmed the rebels. Berkeley invited Ingram and Langston to dine with him on shipboard, after their surrender at Tindall's Point, after the men had toasted the King and governor, they were allowed to disperse. Then to secure the submission of Gregory Wakelett's cavalry, Berkeley offered not only a pardon, but part of the wampum Bacon's former men had taken from the Native Americans.

Lawrence, Whaley and three others fled westward, risking torture at the hands of natives rather than fall into the governor's control. They were last seen pushing through the snow on the extreme frontier, and may have died of hunger and exposure, or found refuge in some other colony. Drummond was found hiding in Chickahominy Swamp.

== Aftermath ==
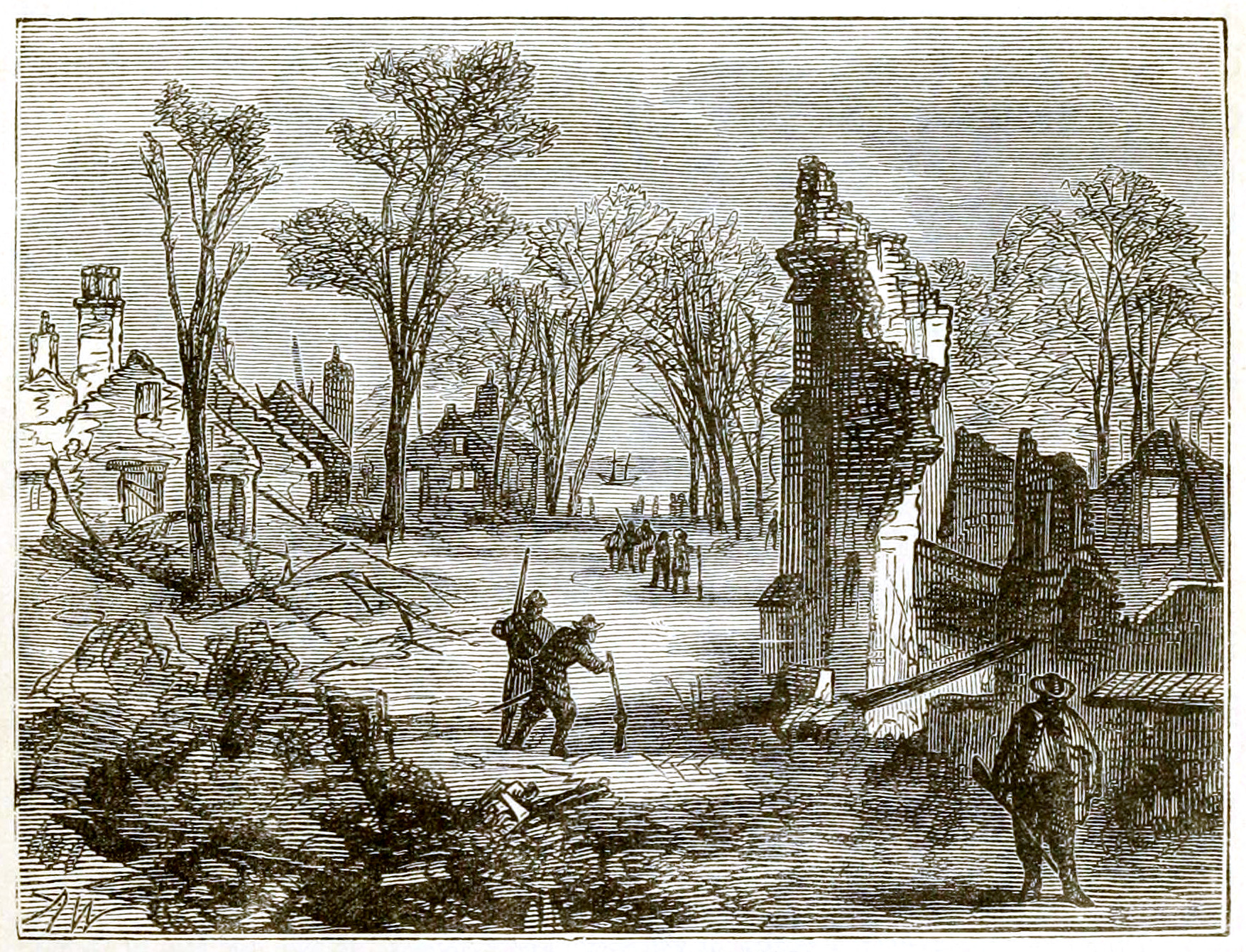
Ruins of Jamestown (1878 engraving).

Although rebel forces were suppressed, the colony was in a deplorable condition, with many plantations deserted or plundered. The government lacked money, and the absence of labor had resulted in small harvests of both tobacco and grain. Nonetheless, at year's end, tobacco ships began to come in with supplies of clothing, cloth, medicines, and sundries.

=== Trials and executions ===
Executions continued for several months. Berkeley acknowledged executing 13 rebels. While his headquarters remained on the Eastern Shore, Berkeley condemned many rebels and executed five. Hansford pleaded that he be shot as a soldier not hanged like a dog, and protested his loyalty as he stood on the scaffold. Major Cheeseman died in prison, though his wife pleaded that she be hanged in his place. Farloe produced his military commission and was told that it authorized fighting only against Natives, not the Governor, and so was also executed, as were Carver, Wilford, and John Johnson.

The 71-year-old governor Berkeley returned to the burned capital and his looted Green Spring home at the end of January 1677. His wife described their Green Spring Plantation in a letter to her cousin:

It looked like one of those the boys pull down at Shrovetide, and was almost as much to repair as if it had been new to build, and no sign that ever there had been a fence around it...

Thomas Young, James Wilson ("Harris" per Berkeley), Henry Page and Thomas Hall were executed on January 12, 1677. Then William Drummond and John Baptista (the latter not mentioned by Berkeley) were tried at Middle Plantation (Williamsburg) not far from Green Spring and executed on January 20. James Crewes, William Cookson and John Digbie ("Darby" being named as a former servant in Berkeley's list) were tried at Jamestown and hanged on January 24.

However, despite receiving orders to return to England, Berkeley delayed his departure for several months, during which he presided over additional trials, apparently disregarding the clemency suggested by the royal representatives. Bacon's wealthy landowning followers returned their loyalty to the Virginia government after Bacon's death. Some former rebels of lower classes were ordered to make public apologies, and many were fined or ordered to pay court costs. The childless, elderly Governor's seizing property of several (but not all) rebels for the colony provoked considerable unrest and dissatisfaction. However, whereas in the initial trials many of the accused were denied counsel, such were present in several of the later trials. Berkeley in particular grew displeased with his former King's Counsel, William Sherwood for defending former rebels. Former customs collector Giles Bland and Anthony Arnold were executed on March 8, then John Isles and Richard Pomfrey on March 15 and John Whitson and William Scarburgh on March 16. Scholars differ as to the number of men executed, although roughly double the number in Berkeley's report. One scholar counted 25 executions another states 23 men were executed by hanging.

=== Royal commission and Berkeley's death ===
Meanwhile, after an investigative committee returned its report to King Charles II, Berkeley was relieved of the governorship and recalled to England. According to one historian, "Because the tobacco trade generated a crown revenue of about £5–£10 per laboring man, King Charles II wanted no rebellion to distract the colonists from raising the crop." Charles II was reported to have commented, "That old fool has put to death more people in that naked country than I did here for the murder of my father." No record of the king's comments have been found, and the origin of the story appears to have been colonial legend that arose at least 30 years after the events. The king prided himself on the clemency he had shown to his father's enemies. Berkeley left his wife, Frances Berkeley, in Virginia and returned to England. She sent a letter to let him know that the current governor was making a bet that the king would refuse to receive him. However, William Berkeley died in July 1677, shortly after he landed in England.

=== Resolution by Herbert Jeffreys ===
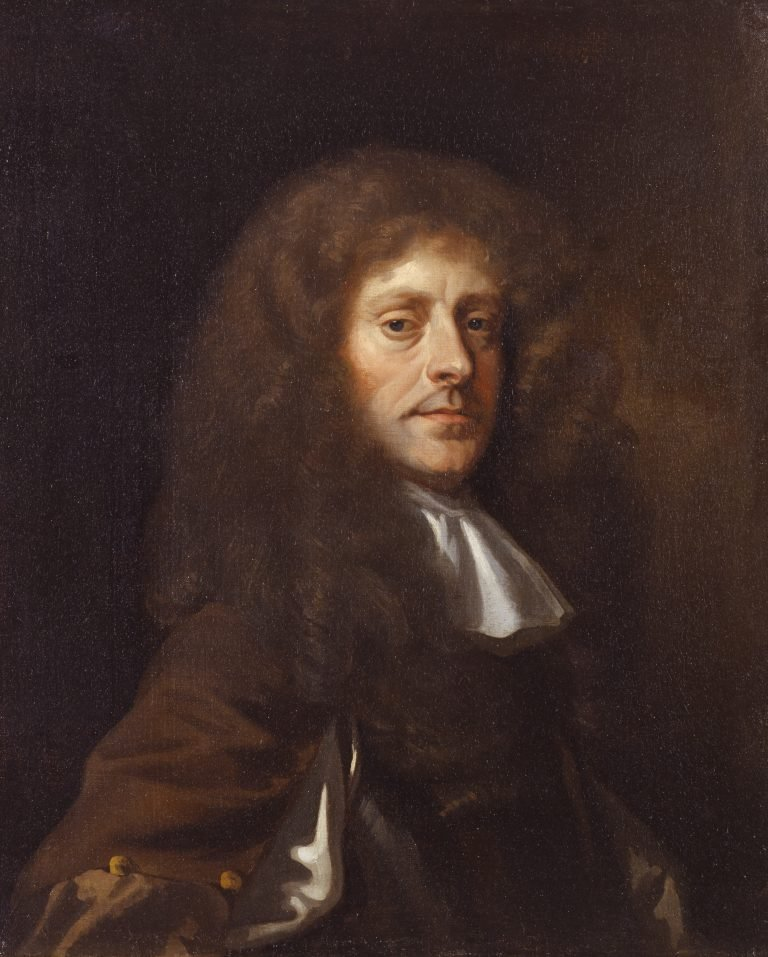
Portrait of Herbert Jeffreys, c. 1677

In November 1676, Herbert Jeffreys was appointed by Charles II as a lieutenant governor of Virginia colony and arrived in Virginia in February 1677. During Bacon's Rebellion, Jeffreys was commander-in-chief of the regiment of six warships carrying over 1,100 troops, tasked with quelling and pacifying the rebellion upon their arrival. He served as leader of a three-member commission (alongside Sir John Berry and Francis Moryson) to inquire into the causes of discontent and political strife in the colony. The commission published a report for the King titled "A True Narrative of the Rise, Progresse, and Cessation of the late Rebellion in Virginia," which provided an official report and history of the insurrection.

On 27 April 1677, with the support of the King, Jeffreys assumed the role of acting colonial governor following Bacon's Rebellion, succeeding Berkeley. Shortly after Jeffreys took over as acting governor, Berkeley angrily remarked that Jeffreys had an "irresistible desire to rule this country" and that his action could not be justified. He wrote to Jeffreys, "I believe that the inhabitants of this Colony will quickly find a difference between your management and mine."

As acting governor, Jeffreys was responsible for appeasing the remaining factions of resistance and reforming the colonial government to be once more under direct Crown control. Jeffreys presided over the Treaty of 1677, the formal peace treaty between the Crown and representatives from various Virginia Native American tribes that was signed on 28 May 1677. In October 1677, Jeffreys persuaded the Virginia General Assembly to pass an act of amnesty for all of the participants in Bacon's Rebellion, and levied fines against any citizen of the colony that called another a "traitor" or "rebel." Jeffreys led efforts to rebuild and restore the state house and colonial capital of Jamestown which had been burned and looted during the rebellion.

=== Historical disagreements ===
In order for the Virginia elite to maintain the loyalty of the common planters in order to avert future rebellions, one historian commented, they "needed to lead, rather than oppose, wars meant to dispossess and destroy frontier Indians." He elaborated that this bonded the elite to the common planter in wars against Native Americans (at the time, called "Indians"), their common enemy, and enabled the elites to appease free whites with land. Taylor writes, "To give servants greater hope for the future, in 1705 the assembly revived the headright system by promising each freedman fifty acres of land, a promise that obliged the government to continue taking land from the Indians."

Bacon promised his army tax breaks, predetermined wages, and freedom from indentures, "so long as they should serve under his colors." Indentured servants both black and white had joined the frontier rebellion. Seeing them united in a cause alarmed the ruling class. Historians believe the rebellion hastened the hardening of racial lines associated with slavery, as a way for planters and the colony to control some of the poor. For example, historian Eric Foner writes, "The fear of civil war among whites frightened Virginia's ruling elite, who took steps to consolidate power and improve their image: for example, restoration of property qualifications for voting, reducing taxes, and adoption of a more aggressive American Indian policy." Some of these measures, by appeasing the poor white population, may have had the purpose of inhibiting any future unification with the enslaved black population.

== Historiography ==
In 1676, Ann Cotton wrote a personal account of Bacon's Rebellion, written in the form of a letter. It was published much later in its original form, in 1804, in the Richmond Enquirer under the title, An account of our late troubles in Virginia. The following year, the same paper published The Beginning, Progress, and Conclusion of Bacon's Rebellion, which former participant Thomas Mathew wrote in 1704 (the year before his death), and which had been acquired for President Thomas Jefferson, who gave his former mentor George Wythe permission to have it published.

Historians question whether the rebellion by Bacon against Berkeley in 1676 had any lasting significance for the more-successful American Revolution a century later. The most idolizing portrait of Bacon is found in Torchbearer of the Revolution (1940) by Thomas Jefferson Wertenbaker, which one scholar in 2011 called "one of the worst books on Virginia that a reputable scholarly historian ever published." The central area of debate is Bacon's controversial character and complex disposition, as illustrated by Wilcomb E. Washburn's The Governor and the Rebel (1957). Rather than singing Bacon's praises and chastising Berkeley's tyranny, Washburn found the roots of the rebellion in the colonists' intolerable demand to "authorize the slaughter and dispossession of the innocent as well as the guilty."

More nuanced approaches on Berkeley's supposed tyranny or mismanagement entertained specialist historians throughout the middle of the twentieth century, leading to a diversification of factors responsible for Virginia's contemporary instability. Wesley Frank Craven in the 1968 publication, The Colonies in Transition, argues that Berkeley's greatest failings took place during the revolt, near the end of his life. Bernard Bailyn pushed the novel thesis that it was a question of access to resources, a failure to fully transplant Old World society to New.

Edmund S. Morgan's 1975 classic, American Slavery, American Freedom: The Ordeal of Colonial Virginia, connected the calamity of Bacon's Rebellion, namely the potential for lower-class revolt, with the colony's transition over to slavery, saying, "But for those with eyes to see, there was an obvious lesson in the rebellion. Resentment of an alien race might be more powerful than resentment of an upper class. Virginians did not immediately grasp it. It would sink in as time went on."

James Rice's 2012 narrative, Tales from a Revolution: Bacon's Rebellion and the Transformation of Early America, whose emphasis on Bacon's flaws echoes The Governor and the Rebel, integrates the rebellion into a larger story emphasizing the actions of multiple Native Americans, as well as placing it in the context of politics in Europe. In this telling, the climax of Bacon's Rebellion comes with the "Glorious Revolution" of 1688/89.

== Legacy ==
According to the Historic Jamestowne website, "For many years, historians considered the Virginia Rebellion of 1676 to be the first stirring of revolutionary sentiment in [North] America, which culminated in the American Revolution almost exactly one hundred years later. However, in the past few decades, based on findings from a more distant viewpoint, historians have come to understand Bacon's Rebellion as a power struggle between two stubborn, selfish leaders rather than a glorious fight against tyranny."

Nonetheless, many in the early United States, including Thomas Jefferson, saw Bacon as a patriot and believed that Bacon's Rebellion truly was a prelude to the later American Revolution against the control of the Crown. This understanding of the conflict was reflected in 20th-century commemorations, including a memorial window in Colonial Williamsburg and a prominent tablet in the Virginia House of Delegates chamber of the State Capitol in Richmond, which recalls Bacon as "A great Patriot Leader of the Virginia People who died while defending their rights October 26, 1676." Subsequent to the rebellion, the Virginia colonial legislature enacted the Virginia Slave Codes of 1705, which created several strict laws upon people of African background. Additionally, the codes were intended to socially segregate the white and black races.

== Use of jimsonweed ==
Jimsonweed is a deliriant plant that was first documented by a Virginian colonist named Robert Beverley. In his 1705 book on the history of Virginia, Beverley reported that some soldiers, who had been dispatched to Jamestown to quell Bacon's Rebellion, gathered and ate leaves of Datura stramonium and spent eleven days acting in bizarre and foolish ways before recovering. After recovering from their intoxication, the soldiers claimed to not remember anything from the past 11 days. This led to the plant being known as Jamestown weed, and later jimsonweed.

Although described as a "cooler" by Beverley, effects can mimic schizophrenia and dissociative disorders, explaining why soldiers acted irrationally, or "went crazy" for days.

== See also ==
- Cockacoeske, Pamunkey chief
- Queen Ann (Pamunkey chief)
- Bacon's Castle
- Culpeper's Rebellion
