= Thomas Ballard =

Virginia landowner and politician

Colonel Thomas Ballard

19th Speaker of the Virginia House of Burgesses
- In office 1680–1682
- Preceded by: Mathew Kemp
- Succeeded by: Edward Hill, Jr.

Personal details
- Born: 1630 Kent, England
- Died: March 24, 1689 (burial date) Virginia
- Resting place: Bruton Parish Church, Williamsburg, Virginia
- Spouse(s): Anne Thomas (1650–78); Alice Hilliard
- Children: Per Wikipedia article, thirteen children, 12 surviving.
- Profession: Lawyer
- Awards: founder of Yorktown

Military service
- Branch/service: Virginia militia
- Rank: Colonel

Colonel Thomas Ballard (1630/31 – March 24, 1689/90) was a landowner and politician in the Colony of Virginia. He played a role in Bacon's Rebellion. He served on the Governor's Council 1670–79 and was Speaker of the Virginia House of Burgesses 1680–82.

== Early life and family ==
Thomas was born in about March 1630/1. In 1650, he married Anna Thomas, daughter of William and Anne Thomas of Warwickshire, England.

His children included Sarah Ballard, Jane Ballard, John Ballard, Thomas Ballard, Lydia M. Harwood, Martha Margaret Collier, William Ballard, Elizabeth Ladd, Francis Ballard, Matthew Ballard, and one other child that can not be identified (possibly an infant). He also had a brother named John Ballard.

== Early career ==
From about July 1652–March 1663 he was clerk of York County, where he owned land. He also patented land in Gloucester County along the Mattaponi River and Propotank Creek. He actively bought and sold land throughout the colony for most of his adult life.

By 1666 Ballard had moved to James City County, which first elected him to the House of Burgesses that year. He became a close associate of Governor Sir William Berkeley, and was appointed to the Council in June 1670, together with James Bray and Joseph Bridger, who also became important figures in Bacon's Rebellion discussed below. Like Bray, Ballard was a lawyer and active in local courts. He also served as High Sheriff of James City County in 1674, and as a customs collector. In 1675 Ballard bought a 330-acre (1.3 km^{2}) farm in Middle Plantation, the future site of Williamsburg, Virginia.

== Bacon's Rebellion ==
Ballard sold a tract of land in Henrico County to Nathaniel Bacon in 1675. The following year, as Bacon's public hostility to Berkeley's governorship grew, Ballard attempted to mediate the dispute. In June, he negotiated a brief reconciliation between the two, persuading Berkeley to award Bacon a commission to fight Indians. Bacon went into open rebellion in July, forcing Berkeley to flee to the Eastern Shore of Virginia. On July 30, Bacon declared Ballard a "wicked and pernitious counsellor."

Four days later, on August 3, Bacon held a meeting at Middle Plantation at which Ballard, among many others, signed an oath of loyalty to him. Ballard also signed papers urging Bacon to call an election and convene the General Assembly.

In September, Bacon used Anna Ballard and other councillors' wives as human shields in a clash with Berkeley's forces at Jamestown. After Bacon's death in October, the rebellion collapsed. Ballard served on a number of the ensuing courts-martial that condemned the surviving rebels.

In 1677 Berkeley was removed as governor. Lieutenant Governor Herbert Jeffreys removed Ballard from the Council and his customs post, citing his oath to Bacon as proof of his "mutinous Spirit".

== Later life ==
Anna Ballard died in 1678. Thomas Ballard later married Alice Hilliard; they had two children.

In 1679, instructions from London confirmed that Ballard and Philip Ludwell, two members of the "Green Spring faction" of diehard Berkeley loyalists, were barred from the Council. Ballard was returned to the House of Burgesses from James City County, and the House chose him as Speaker for the session of 1680–82. After his service as Speaker, he remained in the House until 1686. He also commanded the county militia during this period.

Ballard was a vestryman of Bruton Parish in Middle Plantation when it built its first brick church in 1682–83. He spent his final years pursuing a lawsuit against Nathaniel Bacon's estate, trying to recover the balance due on the 1675 land sale.

Ballard died and was buried at Bruton Parish Church on March 24, 1689.

== Aftermath ==
Ballard's oldest son and heir, Thomas Ballard, Jr., sold the Middle Plantation estate shortly after his father's death. Most of it went to form the campus of the College of William and Mary.
