= William Sherwood (burgess) =

English attorney, planter, and politician

Member of the House of Burgesses for James City, Colony of Virginia
- In office 1688 Serving with Thomas Ballard
- Preceded by: Henry Hartwell
- Succeeded by: Henry Hartwell

Member of the House of Burgesses for James City County, Colony of Virginia
- In office 1682-1684 Serving with Thomas Ballard
- Preceded by: William White
- Succeeded by: position eliminated

Personal details
- Born: circa 1641 Whitechapel, London, England
- Died: early 1688 Governor's Land Colony of Virginia
- Resting place: Jamestown Churchyard, Virginia
- Spouse: Rachel Codd James
- Children: Richard James II (stepson)
- Occupation: attorney, planter, politician

William Sherwood (1641–1688) was an English attorney who also became a planter, attorney general and politician in the Colony of Virginia. During Bacon's Rebellion, Sherwood alienated both sides, and later served as the colony's Attorney General until disbarred for a previous felony. He represented Jamestown and surrounding James City County in the House of Burgesses (and also leased land and meeting space in Jamestown to the legislature), but also had considerable landholdings in Surry County across the James River. A shareholder in the Royal African Company until his death, Sherwood became its official representative in the colony. He also held local offices in James City County, Jamestown and Surry County.

== Early life ==
He was born in modest circumstances in London's Whitechapel district, to Hugh Sherwood and his wife Anne.

== Career ==
Following Sherwood's emigration to Virginia, by 1674 he had become a sub-sheriff for Surry County, across the James River, and later also held local offices in James City County and Jamestown. By his death, Sherwood owned most of Jamestown Island, which went to his heirs, including 28.5 acres known as Block House Hill specifically bequeathed to his nephew John Jarrett, who had died by 1710.

In 1676, Sherwood wrote an account of Bacon's Rebellion, published by the Massachusetts Historical Society in 1872. During his lifetime, Sherwood also petitioned the king for reimbursement for over 11,000 pounds of tobacco destroyed when Jamestown burned, and another 1000 pounds sterling on behalf of his ward, the orphaned Richard James, because of a house destroyed in the fire set by Richard Lawrence and other Baconites.

He was the Royal African Company's representative in Virginia; his mentor Sir Joseph Williamson being one of the original stockholders, and his friend Jeffrey Jeffrys and his niece's uncle Micajah Perry were the principal contractors importing Africans in Virginia. Sherwood also had a stake in a ship called the 'Nansemond'.

Sherwood invested and speculated in real estate, including in James City County, as well as New Kent County and Stafford County to the north and west. In 1696, Sherwood sold two parcels totalling 2770 acres of land in Stafford County Virginia to George Mason. The property included Dogue's Island, and a further recording was required in 1699 because he had not obtained release of his wife's dower interest.

== Death and legacy ==
On August 18, 1697, Sherwood wrote in his last will and testament while visiting Captain Henry Jenkins' house in Governor's Land, and died before September 10, 1697 (although the will was admitted to probate in James City on February 7, 1688). He asked to be buried outside the Jamestown church, and made bequests to the poor of James City parish, as well as of White Chapel parish in England. He wanted a gravestone from London inscribed mentioning his birth in White Chapel there, as well as described himself as "a great sinner waiting for a joyful resurrection". His widow received his divinity books as well as a life interest in his real and personal property, and Sir Jeffrey Jeffries was his reversionary heir after all debts and other bequests were paid. Sherwood freed his enslaved Native American cook, Dorothy Jubilee. Sherwood also bequeathed 10 pounds sterling to Mary Abotrobus, another servant (who was to be given corn and clothes by his executor and kept working either by his widow Rachel, or by his friend William Edwards and his wife). Sherwood's executors were William Edwards II, George Marable II and Dionysis Wright. He also made bequests to Micajah Perry of London, Governor Edmond Andros, Captain Arthur Spicer, Captain Henry Jenkins and his son, the executors William Edward II and Dionysis Wright, as well as his niece Joanna Jarrett, Joseph Petit and Hugh Davis.

Sherwood's widow, Rachel (who had previously survived Richard James before marrying Sherwood in 1675, but whose son Richard James II died before 1690) remarried again, in 1699, to Edward Jaquelin (although he was younger than her late son), but had no children. She had rented her Jamestown house to the government (which moved to Williamsburg by December 16, 1700). On December 11, 1704 Jaquelin purchased Jeffry Jeffrey's interest in Sherwood's estate, which included about 400 acres on Jamestown Island that would later become known as the Jaquelin/Ambler plantation. In 1712 Jaquelin began leasing a 151 acre plantation on the mainland adjoining Jamestown from Philip Ludwell II. Jaquelin remarried after Rachels' death and his new wife Martha Cary of Elizabeth City County produced heirs. He would continue purchasing parcels nearby so that his Ambler descendants owned a plantation called the Amblers near the former Governor's land and on the causeway to Jamestown.
