= James Crewes =

Colonial merchant, politician and rebel (1622–1677)

- Born: 1622/23; England
- Died: January 26, 1677 (aged 55); Jamestown, Colony of Virginia
- Cause of death: Execution by hanging
- Other name: James Crews
- Conviction: Treason
- Penalty: Death

Member of the House of Burgesses for Henrico County
- In office June 1676 – 26 January 1677 Serving with Nathaniel Bacon
- Preceded by: William Farrar
- Succeeded by: Thomas Cocke

James Crewes (or Crews, b. 1622/23 – d. 26 January 1677) was an English merchant who traded with the Virginia colony before emigrating there. He became a planter in Henrico County and represented it for one session of the House of Burgesses, but was executed for his participation in Bacon's Rebellion.

== Early life ==
Born in England in 1622 or 1623, he had at least two brothers who were merchants.

== Career ==
Crewes often traveled between the colony and England as a tobacco merchant. In 1652 he testified in a legal case about the death of Francis Giles at Jordan's Point in the colony. By 1655, Crewes had acquired 541 acres and established a tobacco plantation in Henrico County on Turkey Island in the James River. By 1670 he had become captain in the local militia, and surviving court records indicate he was involved as a trustee and executor of estates. Crewes had indentured servants, including two of African descent, and had permission to have a servant of Indian descent, possibly to assist him with fur trading. By the time of his death, Crewes also owned a store and a substantial house with four fireplaces.

Crewes befriended the young adventurer immigrant Nathaniel Bacon and became one of his most loyal supporters. Crews and trader William Byrd I (who sided with the governor during the rebellion) encouraged Bacon's military response to Native American raids.

After Governor Berkeley removed Bacon from his seat on the Governor's Council and labeled him a rebel, Governor Berkeley called for elections for the first time since 1661. Henrico County voters elected both this man and Bacon to represent them in the House of Burgesses. Crewes signed one of the rebellion's crucial documents, that of August 3, with approximately 69 co-signatories, and may have held the bible when new recruits swore allegiance. He likely traveled to lower Norfolk county in southeastern Virginia in the fall, around the time of Bacon's death, and was one of the last of the rebellion's ringleaders to be caught. Berkeley later called Crewes as Bacon's "trumpet" and accused him of promoting the insurrection.

== Death and legacy ==
Captured by Governor Berkeley's forces, Crewes was among the 15 or 16 former rebel captives on the warship Young Prince which docked at the colony's capital on January 19. Crewes and six or seven others received a summary trial at Berkeley's Green Spring plantation on January 24. Crewes admitted his guilt and was sentenced to be hanged two days later. The execution was carried out on January 26, 1677. Although Berkeley issued a proclamation two weeks later noting that those estates were not exempt from seizure because of that conviction, his property went to his niece Sarah Whittingham (daughter of Edward Crewes) and nephew Mathew Crewes (son of Francis Crewes) in England. In his will which he had executed on July 23, 1676, Crewes also bequeathed property to relatives of Giles Carter, although their relationship is uncertain. By 1662, he may have married Margaret Llewellin, who signed a document as Margaret Crewes. Thus, if Crewes married, his wife predeceased him, and they had no children.

At least part of his former plantation on Turkey Island in the James River was acquired in August by his neighbor William Randolph, where it became one of the seats of the Randolph family of Virginia.
