= Thomas Ballard Jr. =

American politician

Colonel Thomas Ballard Jr. (c. 1654 - bef. October 1710), was a member of the Virginia House of Burgesses from York County, Virginia.

Ballard was a son of Colonel Thomas Ballard, of the council of state born around 1654 at Middle Plantation, Virginia. He served as one of the justices of York Co. and was Colonel of the Militia. He was burgess for York Co. in 1693, 1697, 1698, 1699, 1700-1702, 1703-1705 and 1710-1712. He married Catherine Hubbard, a daughter of John Hubbard. His will was proved in York county, June 18, 1711. He left children, among them Capt. John Ballard, of York county, who died in 1745.
