= Virginia Slave Codes of 1705 =

Laws that founded Virginia's slave legislation

The Virginia Slave Codes of 1705 (formally entitled An act concerning Servants and Slaves), were a series of laws enacted by the Colony of Virginia's House of Burgesses in 1705 regulating the interactions between slaves and citizens of the crown colony of Virginia. The enactment of the Slave Codes is considered to be the consolidation of slavery in Virginia, and served as the foundation of Virginia's slave legislation. All servants from non-Christian lands became slaves. There were 41 parts of this code, each defining a different part and law surrounding slavery in Virginia. These codes overruled past slave codes and those of any other subject covered by this act.

The laws were devised to establish a greater level of control over the rising African slave population of Virginia. It also socially segregated white colonists from Black enslaved persons, making them disparate groups and hindering their ability to unite. Unity among the commoners was a fear of the Virginia aristocracy, who wished to prevent repeats of events such as Bacon's Rebellion, which occurred 29 years prior.

== Context ==
Before the passing of the 1705 Virginia Slave Code Act, African Americans served as indentured servants. This law, after being passed, transformed servitude into slavery, turning many African Americans from extended servitude to a bonded and forced lifetime commitment to slavery.

== Short summary of each act ==
I : Any servant brought to the country who is Christian and above nineteen will serve until they reach twenty four.

II: Every indentured servant must be brought to the courts to determine their age and their period of servitude will be dependent on that.

III: If a servant who is being sold claims to have indentures (a legal contract), the master or owner can bring the servant before a justice to verify this claim.

IV: All servants brought into the country, who were not Christians in their home country with a few exceptions (Turks and Moors) will be considered and treated as slaves. Even if they convert to Christianity later, they will still be bought and sold as slaves.

V: If any person imports into the colony and sells as a slave someone who was previously a free person in any Christian country, island, or plantation, the importer or seller will be required to pay double the amount for which the person was sold to the freed individual.

VI: Being in England is not enough to free a slave, they must provide proof of freedom.

VII: Masters of servants are required to provide adequate food, clothing, and lodging. The masters are also prohibited to give excessive punishment to any White Christian servant.

VIII: Grants rights to all servants who are not slaves, whether imported or voluntarily becoming servants, or bound by a court or church-wardens. They can present their complaints to a justice of the peace.

IX: States that if a servant is sick, disabled, or otherwise incapable of being sold to cover expenses, the court will order the church-wardens to take care of the servant until their legal time of service is completed, or until they recover to be sold and cover the fees and charges.

X: States that all servants have the right to petition the court for their wages and freedom in cases of mistreatment.

XI: States that no individuals, such as Negroes, mulattos, Indians, Jews, Moors, Muslims, or other non-Christians, will be allowed to purchase Christian servants. If any person from the aforementioned groups purchases a Christian white servant, that servant will automatically become free.

XV: States that no person is allowed to buy, sell, or receive any form of currency or goods from a servant or slave without the permission of their master or owner.

XVI: States that if a person is convicted of dealing with a servant or slave in violation of this act and fails to provide satisfactory security for their good behavior, the court will order the offender to receive specified punishment.

XVII: States that if a female servant has a child out of wedlock with a Negro or mulatto, in addition to completing her designated years of service, she must pay fifteen pounds in current Virginia currency. This is the same case, if a free Christian white woman has a child out of wedlock with a Negro or mulatto. Then the child will serve as a servant until they reach the age of thirty-one.

XIX: States that it is unlawful to intermarry between English or other white individuals and Negroes or mulattos especially if said English is freed.

XX: States that no minister of the Church of England or any other person within the colony and dominion is allowed to knowingly marry a white person with a Negro or mulatto, or vice versa.

XXIII: States that a reward will be given to anyone who successfully captures and returns a runaway servant or slave.

XXIV: States that if a runaway slave, who does not speak English or refuses to disclose their master or owner's name, is captured, the justice of the peace may certify this instead of providing the specific details.

XXV: When a runaway is brought before a justice of the peace, the justice shall issue a warrant to commit the runaway to the next constable.

XXIX: If any constable or sheriff, to whom a runaway servant or slave is entrusted according to this act, allows the escape of such runaway, the constable or sheriff shall be held accountable.

XXXII: Any master, mistress, or overseer of a household shall not knowingly allow any enslaved person who does not belong to them to stay on their plantation for more than four hours without the permission of the enslaved person's master, mistress, or overseer.

XXXIV: If a slave resists their master, owner, or any other person who is authorized by the master or owner to correct them, and as a result, the slave is killed, it shall not be considered a felony. As well as if a negro, mulatto, or Indian, whether enslaved or free, raises a hand in opposition against a non-negro, non-mulatto, or non-Indian individual, they shall receive punishment.

XXXV: No slave shall carry or possess firearms or any other weapons, nor leave the designated plantation or land without a written certificate of permission from their master.

XXXVI: Baptism does not exempt negro, mulatto, or Indians from enslavement

XXXVII: States that slaves often run away and hide in secluded areas, causing harm and damage to the people of the colony. In such cases, if there is information about runaway slaves, two justices of the peace in the relevant county are authorized and required to issue a proclamation.

XXXVIII: For every slave killed, in pursuance of this act, or put to death by law, the master or owner of such slave shall be paid by the public.

XXXIX: To determine the compensation for a slave who has been killed or put to death as mentioned earlier, it is required that the true value of the slave be assessed. The court clerk will then provide a certificate of the assessed value to the assembly along with other public claims.

XL: To ensure the proper enforcement of this act and to prevent any servants or slaves from claiming ignorance of its provisions, the church-wardens of each parish will be responsible for providing a true copy of the act and recording it in the parish register book at the expense of the parish.

XLI: Furthermore, all previous acts, clauses, and articles that pertain to servants, slaves, or any other matter covered by this act are hereby repealed and declared null and void. They shall have no effect or validity as if they had never been enacted.

== Contents of the Virginia Slave Codes of 1705 ==
These codes effectively embedded the idea of enslaving Black people into law by the following devices: These codes: established new property rights for slave owners, allowed for the legal, free trade of slaves with protections granted by the courts, established separate courts of trial, prohibited slaves from going armed without written permission, forbid Blacks to employ whites, allowed for the apprehension of suspected runaways, outlawed the harboring of another person's slaves, and made it a crime for white people to marry people of Native or African descent.

White slaveowners, especially, were allowed to take control and advantage of African Americans for monetary gain. This also applied to the promotion of free white people to "hunt" down and capture escaped enslaved peoples, even with a reward system to promote said captures.

=== Non-White purchasing of slaves or indentured servants ===
Non-whites were unable to purchase any white Christian. If someone of these said descents were to inherit a white servant, the servant would be freed.

== See also ==
- Bacon's Laws
- Slave codes
- Slavery in the United States
- Thomas Jefferson and slavery
- Treaty of 1677
