= Herbert Jeffreys (English Army officer) =

English army officer and colonial administrator

Sir Herbert Jeffreys
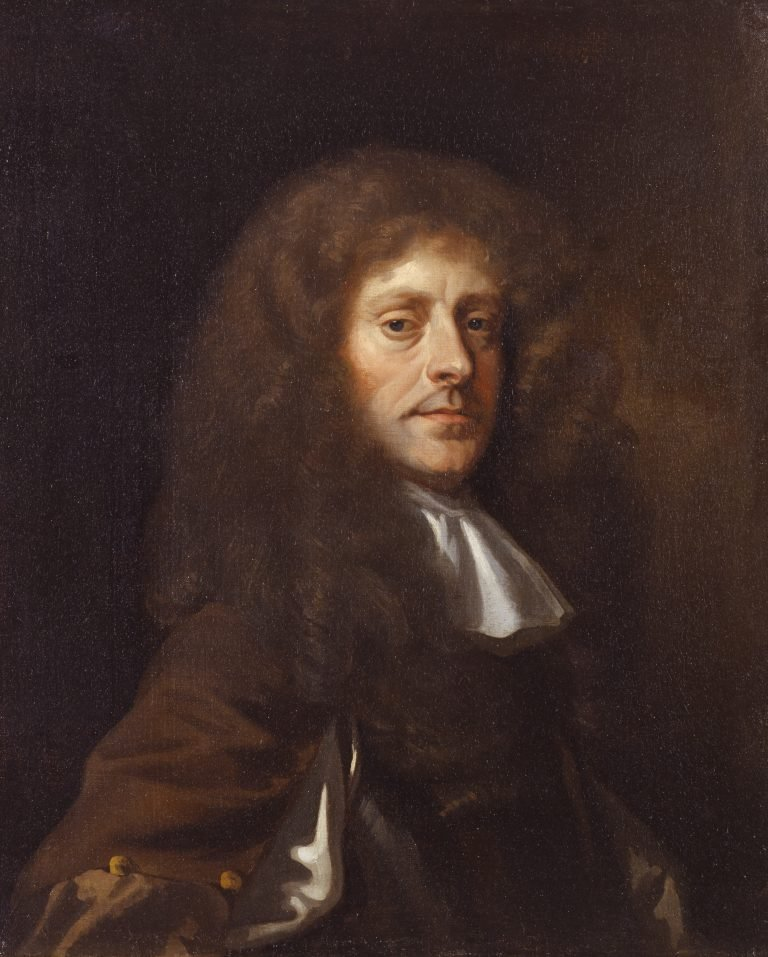
- c. 1677 portrait

Acting governor of Virginia
- In office April 27, 1677 – December 17, 1678
- Monarch: Charles II
- Preceded by: Sir William Berkeley
- Succeeded by: Sir Henry Chicheley

Personal details
- Born: c. 1620 – 1625 Kirkham, North Yorkshire, England
- Died: 17 December 1678 Jamestown, Virginia Colony, British America
- Spouse: Susanna Osborne
- Children: 7

Lieutenant-Colonel Sir Herbert Jeffreys (c. 1620 – 17 December 1678) was an English army officer and colonial administrator who served as the acting governor of Virginia in the immediate aftermath of Bacon's Rebellion. American historian Douglas Edward Leach described Jeffreys as a "chief troubleshooter" and "the most active and expert guardsman in the political police function of the courtier army."

== Early life and family ==
Jeffreys was born around 1620–1625 in Kirkham, North Yorkshire, England. He is believed related to the London merchant brothers and alderman John and Jeffrey Jeffreys. Sir Jeffrey Jeffreys and London merchant Micajah Perry held contracts with the Royal African Company to sell Africans in the Virginia colony.

Jeffreys married Susanna Osborne (who survived him, as did their son John). They had seven children during the period between 1666 and 1674. The Jeffreys family resided in Yorkshire and attended Saint Michael-Le-Belfry church in the city of York.

== Military service ==
Jeffreys was a longtime military officer and staunch royalist. From 1642 until 1648, he fought for King Charles I in the English Civil War. During the period following, Jeffreys was in French exile, where he served on the military staff of Charles I's second son, James, Duke of York. While in Flanders, Jeffreys supported the repression of the Fronde provincial revolts between 1648 and 1653 and helped to form the Guards of Charles II. After the restoration of Charles II as King, Jeffreys served the crown as commander of Guards Garrison companies in Portsmouth, York, the Isle of Jersey, and London. He served as deputy governor of York for over eight years and assumed martial command in 1670. He attained the rank of captain and later lieutenant colonel in the English Army.

== Virginia political career ==
In November 1676, Jeffreys was appointed by Charles II as a lieutenant governor of Virginia colony. He arrived in Virginia in February 1677, in response to Bacon's Rebellion. Jeffreys commanded a regiment of six warships carrying over 1,100 troops, and was tasked with quelling and pacifying the rebellion. He served as leader of a three-member commission (alongside Sir John Berry and Francis Moryson) to inquire into the causes of discontent and political strife in the colony. The commission published a report for the King titled "A True Narrative of the Rise, Progresse, and Cessation of the late Rebellion in Virginia," which provided an official report and history of the insurrection.

On 27 April 1677 and with the support of the King, Jeffreys assumed the role of acting colonial governor, succeeding Governor Sir William Berkeley, who was formally recalled to England and convinced to vacate the colony, but who died not long after disembarking in London. Shortly after Jeffreys took over as acting governor, Berkeley angrily remarked that Jeffreys had an "irresistible desire to rule this country" and that his action could not be justified. He wrote to Jeffreys, "I believe that the inhabitants of this Colony will quickly find a difference between your management and mine."

As acting governor, Jeffreys was responsible for appeasing the remaining factions of resistance and reforming the colonial government to be once more under direct Crown control.

As acting governor, Jeffreys presided over the Treaty of 1677, the formal peace treaty between the Crown and representatives from various Virginia Native American tribes that was signed on 28 May 1677. In January 1678 he recommended it be expanded to neighboring English colonies.

Meanwhile, in October 1677, Jeffreys persuaded the Virginia General Assembly to pass an act of amnesty for all of the participants in Bacon's Rebellion, and levied fines against any citizen of the colony that called another a "traitor" or "rebel." Jeffreys also led efforts to rebuild and restore the state house and colonial capital of Jamestown which had been burned and looted during the rebellion.

As acting governor, Jeffreys was known for suspending some of his most outspoken critics from office. He was strongly opposed by the "Green Spring faction" of members of the assembly and Governor's council, who remained loyal to Berkeley. Philip Ludwell, who married Berkeley's widow, referred to Jeffreys as "a pitiful little fellow with a periwig."

== Death and legacy ==
Jeffreys suffered from a debilitating illness which recurred in June 1678. He died on December 17, 1678, at the age of 53–58. He was one of the first colonial governors of Virginia to die while in office and was generally unpopular among Virginia's public at the time of his death. He was immediately succeeded by Henry Chicheley as acting governor.

== See also ==
- Colony of Virginia
- History of Virginia
- List of colonial governors of Virginia
