= List of colonial governors of Virginia =

Appointed post in the Colony of Virginia

Governor of the Colony of Virginia
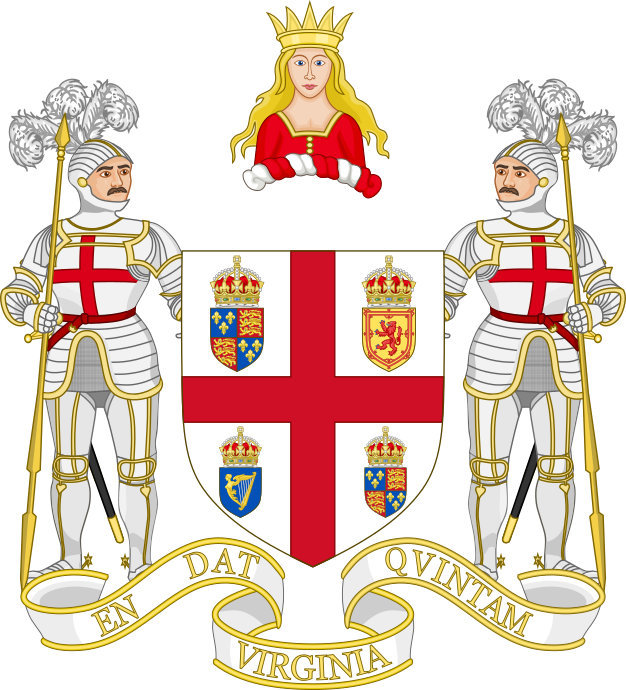
- Arms of the Virginia Company

- Banner of the Virginia Company

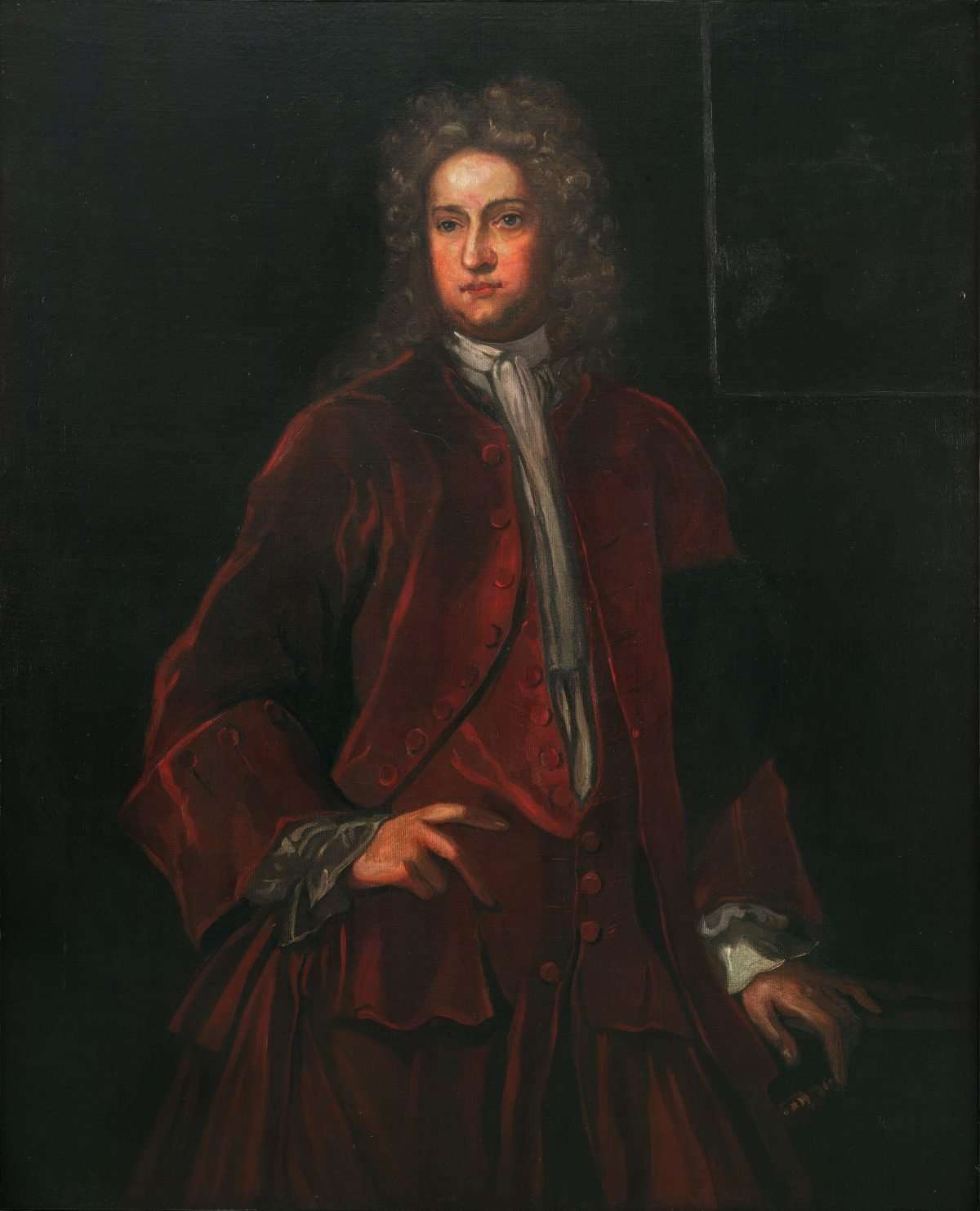
- Longest-Serving; Sir William Berkeley; 1642–1652, 1660–1677
- Type: Colonial Governor
- Status: Abolished
- Member of: General Court of Virginia
- Seat: Jamestown, Virginia 1619–1699; Williamsburg, Virginia 1699–1776
- Appointer: British Monarch
- Formation: 1607
- First holder: Edward Maria Wingfield
- Final holder: John Murray, 4th Earl of Dunmore
- Abolished: 1776 (de facto); 1783 (de jure)
- Superseded by: Governor of Virginia

The Governor of the Colony of Virginia was the appointed head of government of the British Colony of Virginia. The title "Governor of Virginia" saw sporadic use beginning in 1585 to describe various kinds of leadership positions in the New World, including of the Roanoke Colony and the Virginia Company. The position was formally defined in 1624, when Virginia became a crown colony and its governor became an appointed position subordinate to the British Monarch.

As in other British colonies, the Governor had broad authority to impose the will of the Monarch on the colonists. The Governor was ex officio president of the General Court of Virginia and was advised by the Virginia Governor's Council. They also possessed veto power over the elected House of Burgesses.

Some Governors never visited the New World and governed through deputies resident in the colony. Others held the role for many years but were in Virginia for only a short portion of time and usually delegated responsibilities to others. Therefore, in many documents and references, the deputies and lieutenant governors who had the primary responsibility in Virginia are also often titled simply "governor".

Lord Dunmore served as the colony's last royal governor. His actions in the face of the crown's unpopularity, including dissolving the House of Burgesses and imposing martial law, proved deeply unpopular, leading to the Virginia Conventions. Dunmore fled in 1776, and the Convention formally recognized Patrick Henry as the first Governor of Virginia under the newly-established Constitution of Virginia. Though the office was de facto abolished during the Revolutionary War, Britain formally abolished the office following their recognition of American independence in the Treaty of Paris.

== Governor of Virginia (1585–1590) ==
The first English attempt to colonize Virginia was the "Lost Colony" of Roanoke. Unsuccessful settlements were established under two different governors, and the final fate of the colonists remains unknown.

- Sir Walter Raleigh, Governor of Virginia (1585–1590, absentee)
  - Sir Ralph Lane, Governor of Roanoke (Virginia) (1585–1586)
  - John White, Governor of Raleigh (Virginia) (1587–1590)

== Virginia Company of London Governors (1607–1624) ==
From 1606 until 1624, Proprietary Governors oversaw the operation of the Virginia Colony. Most were styled "President of the Council", although some were styled "governor" by the proprietors.

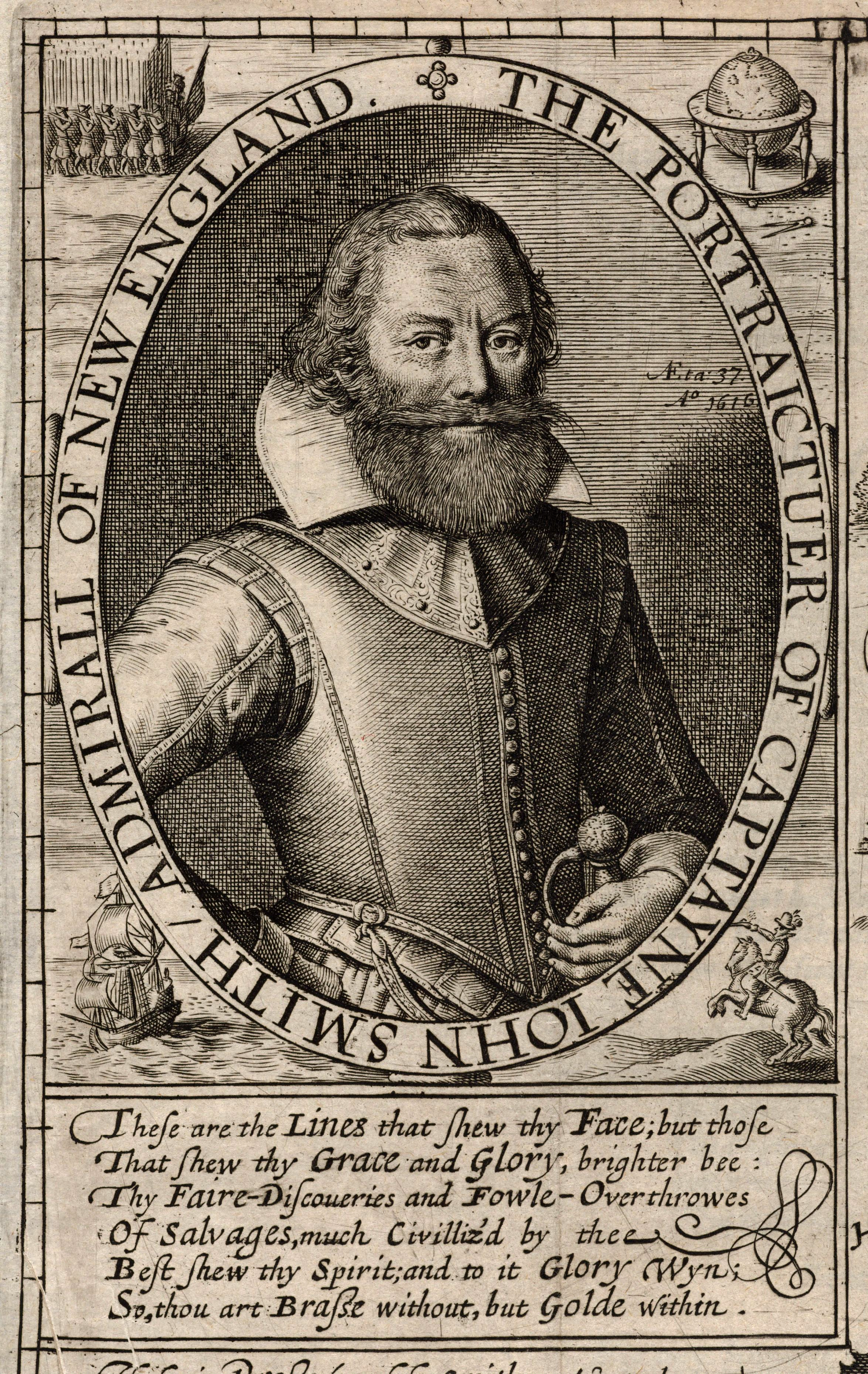
Captain John Smith, from his 1614 map of New England

1. President of the Council Edward Maria Wingfield (1607)
2. President of the Council John Ratcliffe (1608)
3. Acting President Matthew Scrivener (1608)
4. President of the Council John Smith (1608–1609)
5. President of the Council George Percy (1609–1610)
6. Lord Governor and Captain General Thomas West, 3rd Baron De La Warr (1609–1618, sometimes absentee)
  1. Deputy Governor Sir Thomas Gates (May–June 1610)
  2. Deputy Governor George Percy (March–May 1611)
  3. Acting Governor Sir Thomas Dale (May–August 1611)
  4. Acting Governor Sir Thomas Gates (1611–1613)
  5. Acting Governor Sir Thomas Dale (1613–1616)
  6. Lieutenant Governor Sir George Yeardley (1616–1617)
  7. Lieutenant Governor Sir Samuel Argall (1617–1619)
  8. Acting Governor Captain Nathaniel Powell (April 1619)
7. Governor Sir George Yeardley (1619–1621)
8. Governor Sir Francis Wyatt (1621–1624)

== Crown Governors (1624–1652) ==
After the Virginia Company of London lost its proprietary charter in 1624, the colony was taken over by the English Crown, and became a crown colony. Governors were appointed by the ruling monarch to oversee the interests of the Crown. During the interregnum period (1649–1660), when England came under commonwealth rule and the protectorate rule of Oliver and Richard Cromwell, those governments appointed Virginia's governors. William Berkeley, who was governor at the time of the execution of King Charles I, remained in office until the arrival of a Commonwealth fleet in 1651 led to his removal. Berkeley was returned to office by votes of the Virginia assembly and by appointment of the restored King Charles II in 1660.

- Governor Sir Francis Wyatt (1624–1626)
- Governor Sir George Yeardley (1626–1627)
- Acting Governor Francis West (1627–1629)
- Governor Sir John Harvey (1628–1639)
  - Acting Governor John Pott (1629–1630)
  - Acting Governor John West (1635–1636)
  - Acting Governor Col. George Reade (1638–1639)
- Governor Sir Francis Wyatt (1639–1642)
- Governor Sir William Berkeley (1642–1652)
  - Acting Governor Sir Richard Kemp (1644–1645)

== Commonwealth and Protectorate Governors (1652–1660) ==
- Governor Richard Bennett (1652–1655)
- Governor Edward Digges (1655–1656)
- Governor Lt. Col. Samuel Mathews (1656–1660, died in office)

== Crown Governors (1660–1775) ==
- Governor Sir William Berkeley (1660–1677)
  - Lieutenant Governor Francis Moryson (1661–1662)
- Governor Col. Herbert Jeffreys (1677–1678)
- Governor Thomas Colepeper, 2nd Baron Colepeper (1677–1683)
  - Lieutenant Governor Sir Henry Chicheley (1678–1680)
- Acting Governor Col. Nicholas Spencer (September 1683–April 1684)
- Governor Francis Howard, 5th Baron Howard of Effingham (1684–1692, absentee from 1688)
  - Gen. Joseph Bridger (1684)
  - President of the Council Nathaniel Bacon (1688–1690)
  - Lieutenant Governor Francis Nicholson (1690–1692)
- Governor Sir Edmund Andros (1692–1698)
- Acting Governor Ralph Wormeley Jr. (1698)
- Governor George Hamilton, 1st Earl of Orkney (1698–1737, absentee)
  - Lieutenant Governor Francis Nicholson (1698–1705)
  - Lieutenant Governor Col. Edward Nott (1705–1706)
  - Acting Governor Edmund Jenings (1706–1710)
  - Lieutenant Governor General Robert Hunter (1707, captured at sea and never served)
  - Lieutenant Governor Lt. Col. Alexander Spotswood (1710–1722)
  - Lieutenant Governor Col. Hugh Drysdale (1722–1726)
  - President of the Council Robert "King" Carter (1726–September 1727)
  - Lieutenant Governor Sir William Gooch, 1st Baronet (1727–1740)
- Governor Willem Anne van Keppel, 2nd Earl of Albemarle (1737–1754, absentee)
  - Acting Governor James Blair (1740–1741) (acting for Lt. Gov. Gooch while latter out-of-country)
  - Lieutenant Governor Sir William Gooch, 1st Baronet (1741–1749)
  - Acting Governor John Robinson Sr. died months after being sworn in as President {Acting Governor} August 1749; father of Speaker of the VA House of Burgess John Robinson (Virginia politician) Jr (1705–1766) and Colonel Beverley Robinson (1721–1792)
  - Acting Governor Thomas Lee (1749–1750)
  - Acting Governor Lewis Burwell (1750–1751)
  - Lieutenant Governor Robert Dinwiddie (1751–1756)
- Governor John Campbell, 4th Earl of Loudoun (1756–1759)
  - Lieutenant Governor Robert Dinwiddie (1756–January 1758)
  - Lieutenant Governor Francis Fauquier (1758–1768)
- Governor Jeffery Amherst (1759–1768, absentee)
  - Acting Governor John Blair, Sr. (1768)
- Governor Norborne Berkeley, Baron de Botetourt (1768–1770)
- Acting Governor William Nelson (1770–1771)
- Governor John Murray, 4th Earl of Dunmore (1771–June 1775)

== See also ==
- Virginia
- Virginia Company of London
- Virginia Colony
- List of governors of Virginia
