= Nathaniel Bacon (Virginia colonist) =

Colonist of the Virginia Colony and leader of Bacon's Rebellion (1647-1676)

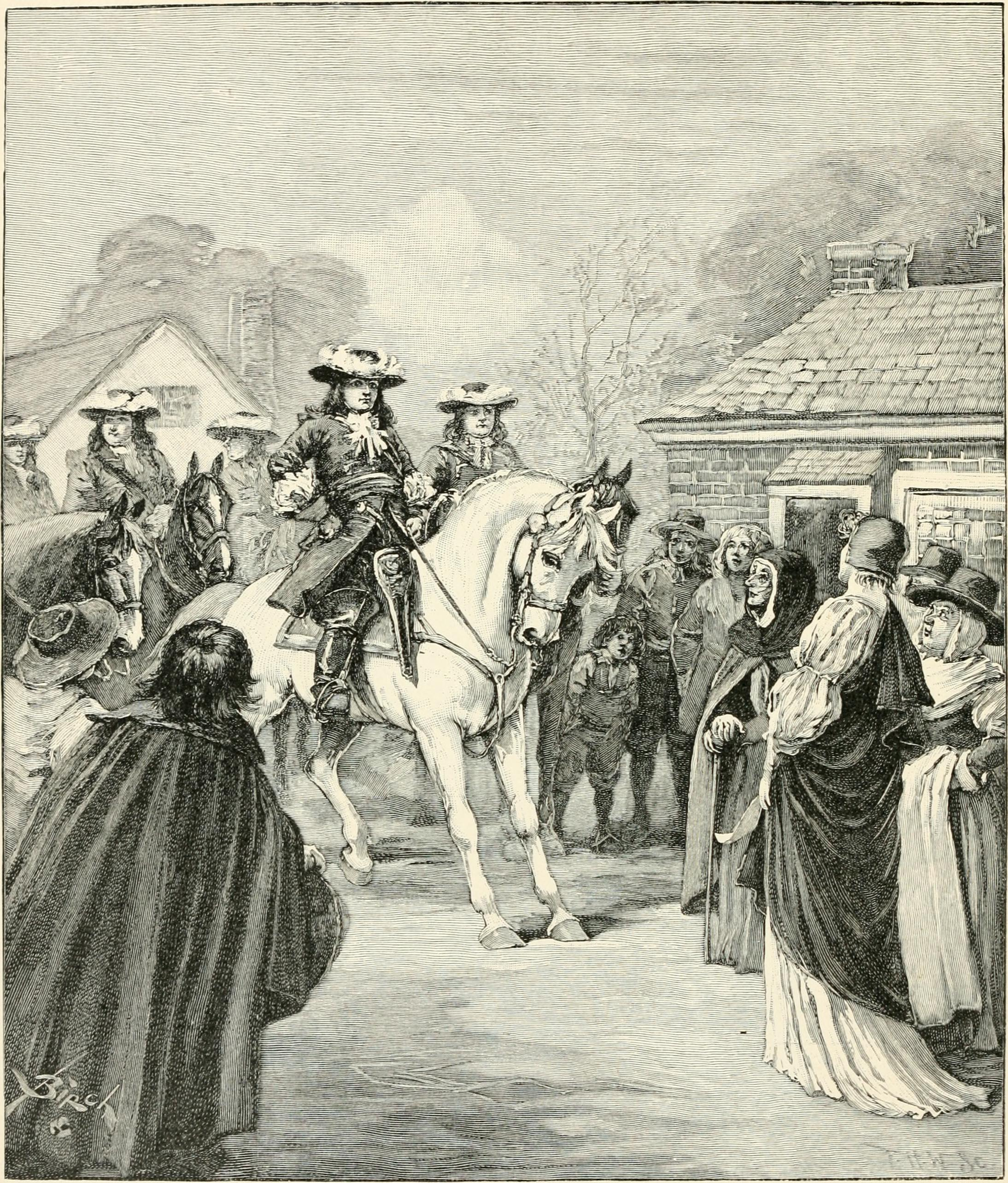
- Illustration of Bacon in Jamestown, c. 1896
- Born: January 2, 1647; Friston, Suffolk, England
- Died: October 26, 1676 (aged 29); West Point, Colony of Virginia, English America
- Cause of death: Dysentery
- Other names: Nathanael [sic] Bacon, "General" Bacon
- Education: St Catharine's College, Cambridge
- Known for: Bacon's Rebellion
- Notable work: "Declaration of the People of Virginia"
- Spouse: Elizabeth Duke (m. 1670)
- Parent: Thomas Bacon
- Relatives: Nathaniel Bacon (cousin)

Member of the House of Burgesses for Henrico County
- In office June 1675 – 26 January 1677 Serving with James Crewes
- Preceded by: Francis Eppes
- Succeeded by: William Byrd I

Member of the Virginia Governor's Council
- In office 1675–1676

Nathaniel Bacon (January 3, 1647 – October 26, 1676) was an English merchant and adventurer who settled in the Virginia Colony, of the Thirteen Colonies where he sat on the Governor's Council. In early 1676 he led Bacon's Rebellion against the Virginia colonial government. The rebellion was briefly successful; but after Bacon’s death from dysentery in October 1676, the rebel forces collapsed.

== Early life and education ==
Coat of Arms of Nathaniel Bacon

Bacon was born on January 3, 1647, in Friston Hall in Suffolk, England, to influential landowner parents Thomas Bacon and his wife Elizabeth (daughter of Sir Robert Brooke of Cockfield Hall, Yoxford and his wife Elizabeth). Nathaniel was his father's only son, and had one full sister, and a half-sister by his father's second wife Martha (Reade), his natural mother having died in 1649 when he was two years old. He was educated at the University of Cambridge, where he was admitted as a Fellow-Commoner at St Catharine's College in 1661. He traveled around Europe (Germany, Italy, Switzerland, France, Netherlands) in 1663–1664 with the celebrated naturalist John Ray and fellow pupils Francis Willughby and Philip Skippon. At the end of April 1664, in Naples, Ray and Skippon took ship for Messina, to continue their expedition together to Sicily, leaving Willughby and Bacon to return north to Rome. He was admitted to study law at Gray's Inn in November 1664.

Nathaniel married Elizabeth Duke, the daughter of Sir Edward Duke of Benhall (1604–1671) and his wife Ellenor Panton, reputedly in direct defiance of her father's veto. After accusations that Nathaniel had cheated another young man of his inheritance, Thomas Bacon gave his son the considerable sum of £1,800 and the young man sailed into exile across the Atlantic. Upon arriving in Virginia, Nathaniel Bacon bought two frontier plantations on the James River.

== Relocation to Virginia ==
Since his cousin and also namesake Nathaniel Bacon was a prominent colonial leader and a good friend of governor William Berkeley, Bacon initially settled in Jamestown, the capital. By 1675, Bacon was himself appointed to the governor's council. Berkeley's wife, the former Frances Culpeper, may also have been Bacon's cousin by marriage.

== Bacon's Rebellion ==
Before the "Virginia Rebellion" (as it came to be called) began in earnest in 1674, some of the freeholders among the American Virginian frontier demanded that American Indians, including those in friendly tribes living on treaty-protected lands, should be driven out or killed. Historians have noted that the hatred among the settlers towards the Native Americans is a historically underrepresented catalyst of Bacon's Rebellion, as the rebellion was equally about "violently [displacing] Indians" and "[exploiting] that hatred" as it was about changing frontier policy in Virginia. They also protested against corruption in the government of Governor Berkeley, which has been described as "incorrigibly corrupt, inhumanely oppressive, and inexcusably inefficient, especially in war".

Predating Bacon's Rebellion, the Anglo-Powhatan Wars instituted the distinct hierarchical separation and selfishness between the Indians and the Virginians that would eventually mold into the basis for the subduing of the Indians during Bacon's Rebellion. Following a raid by Doeg Indians in Stafford County, Virginia, which resulted in the deaths of two white settlers associated with a trader named Thomas Mathew (whom later reports found regularly "cheated and abused" Indians), a group of Virginia militiamen raided settlements of the Susquehannock tribe, instead of the Doeg tribe, including some across the Potomac River in Maryland. Maryland Governor Calvert protested against the incursion, and the Susquehannocks retaliated. Maryland militia under Major Thomas Trueman then joined Virginia forces (now led by John Washington and Isaac Allerton), and attacked a fortified Susquehannock village. After five chiefs accepted the Maryland leader's invitation to parley, they were slaughtered, an action which provoked later legislative investigations and reprimands. The Susquehannocks retaliated in force against plantations, killing 60 settlers in Maryland and a further 36 in their first assault on Virginia soil. Then other tribes joined in, killing settlers, burning houses and fields and slaughtering livestock as far as the James and York rivers.

Seeking to avoid a larger conflict similar to that of King Philip's War in New England, Berkeley advocated containment, proposing the construction of several defensive fortifications along the frontier and urging frontier settlers to gather in a defensive posture. Frontier settlers dismissed the plan as expensive and inadequate, and also suspected that it might be a pretext for raising tax rates.

In the meantime, Bacon owned two large plantations along the James River. This main plantation called "Curles" (about 1000 acres, although only a third cleared since it was formed by others circa 1630, and by now worked by a dozen slaves) was on a peninsula formed by a bend of the James River (hence its name). Another plantation was significantly upstream, near the falls of the James River at Shockoe Creek, and had more cattle. Indian raiders killed Bacon's overseer on that upriver plantation, and Bacon soon emerged as a rebel leader. When Governor Berkeley refused to grant Bacon a military commission to attack all Indians, Bacon mustered his own force of 400–500 men and moved up the James River to attack the Doeg and Pamunkey tribes. Although both had generally lived peaceably with the white Virginian colonists, and had not attacked the frontier settlements, their cultivated lands were valuable.

In March, Berkeley had attempted to secure warriors from the Pamunkey tribe to fight other hostile Amerindian tribes pursuant to earlier treaties. The Pamunkey queen Cockacoeske passionately reminded the Governor's Council of the deaths 20 years ago of her husband and 100 warriors whom they had provided in a similar situation. The chairman had ignored her complaint, and instead continued to demand more warriors, receiving a promise in return to supply a dozen. Berkeley did arrest Bacon and remove him from the council, but Bacon's men quickly secured his release, and forced Berkeley to hold legislative elections. Meanwhile, Bacon's men continued their offensive against the Pamunkeys, who fled into Dragon Swamp. When the friendly Occoneechee managed to capture a Susquehannock fort, Bacon's forces demanded all the spoils, although they had not assisted in the fighting. They then attacked the Oconeechee by treachery, killing 100 to 400 men, women and children.

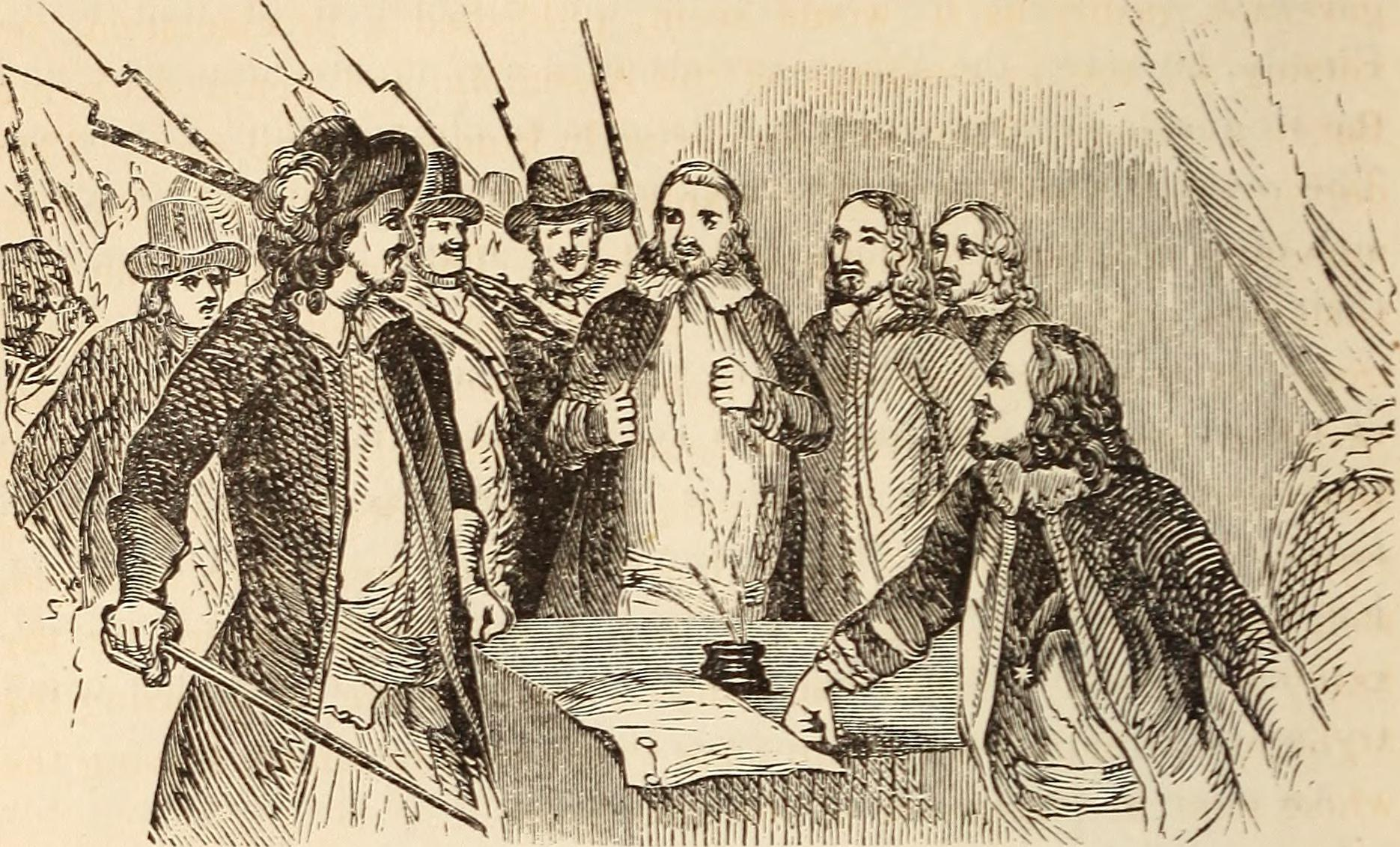
Signing of Bacon's commission

Despite Bacon's outlaw status, voters of Henrico County elected him and his mentor James Crewes to the recomposed House of Burgesses. The body had enacted a number of sweeping reforms, limiting the governor's powers and restoring suffrage rights to landless freemen. They also made the sale of any arms to any Indian punishable by execution. Bacon's followers were unmollified, accusing Berkeley of refusing to authorize retaliation against natives to protect his own fur-trading investments and the monopolies which he had granted to his favorites. After a number of verbal altercations, including a quarrel in a Jamestown street, Berkeley retreated to his plantation and signed the military commission Bacon demanded. Scouting parties accordingly set out to requisition supplies, as well as to kill and enslave Indians, prompting protests from citizens of Gloucester County who were subject to the militia's exactions. Bacon's forces retreated to Middle Plantation (later renamed Williamsburg).

On July 30, 1676, Bacon and his makeshift army issued a Declaration of the People, which criticized Berkeley's administration, accusing him of levying unfair taxes, appointing friends to high positions, and failing to protect outlying farmers from an American Indian attack. They also issued a 'Manifesto' urging the "extirpation" of all Indians, asserting that they did not deserve legal protections because they "have bin for these Many years enemies to the King and Country, Robbers and Thieves and Invaders of his Majesty's Right and our Interest and Estate". Months of conflict ensued, including a naval attempt across the Potomac and in Chesapeake Bay by Bacon's allies to capture Berkeley at Accomac. Bacon himself focused on the Pamunkey in Dragon Swamp; his forces seized 3 horse-loads of goods, enslaved 45 Indians and killed many more, prompting the queen Cockacoeske (who narrowly escaped with her son) to throw herself on the mercy of the Governor's Council. Berkeley raised his own army of mercenaries on the Eastern Shore, and also captured Bacon's naval allies and executed the two leaders. Bacon's forces then turned against the colony's capital, burning Jamestown to the ground on September 19, 1676.

Before a British Royal Navy squadron could arrive, Bacon died of dysentery on October 26, 1676. Although John Ingram took control of the rebel forces, the rebellion soon collapsed. Governor Berkeley returned to power, seizing the property of several rebels and ultimately hanging twenty-three men, many without trial. After an investigative committee returned its report to King Charles II, which criticized both Berkeley and Bacon for their conduct toward friendly tribes, Berkeley was relieved of the governorship, returned to England to protest, and died shortly thereafter. Charles II later supposedly commented, "That old fool has put to death more people in that naked country than I did here for the murder of my father." This may be a colonial myth, arising about 30 years later.

== Legacy ==
Despite many recent historians' views of the conflict, many in the early United States, including president Thomas Jefferson, saw Bacon as a patriot and believed that Bacon's Rebellion was a prelude to the later American Revolution against the rule of the British Crown. This understanding of the conflict was reflected in 20th century American commemorations, including a memorial window in Colonial Williamsburg, and a prominent tablet in the Virginia House of Delegates chamber of the Virginia State Capitol in Richmond, which recalls Bacon as "A great Patriot Leader of the Virginia People who died while defending their rights October 26, 1676."
