= William Berkeley (governor) =

English colonial administrator

Sir William Berkeley
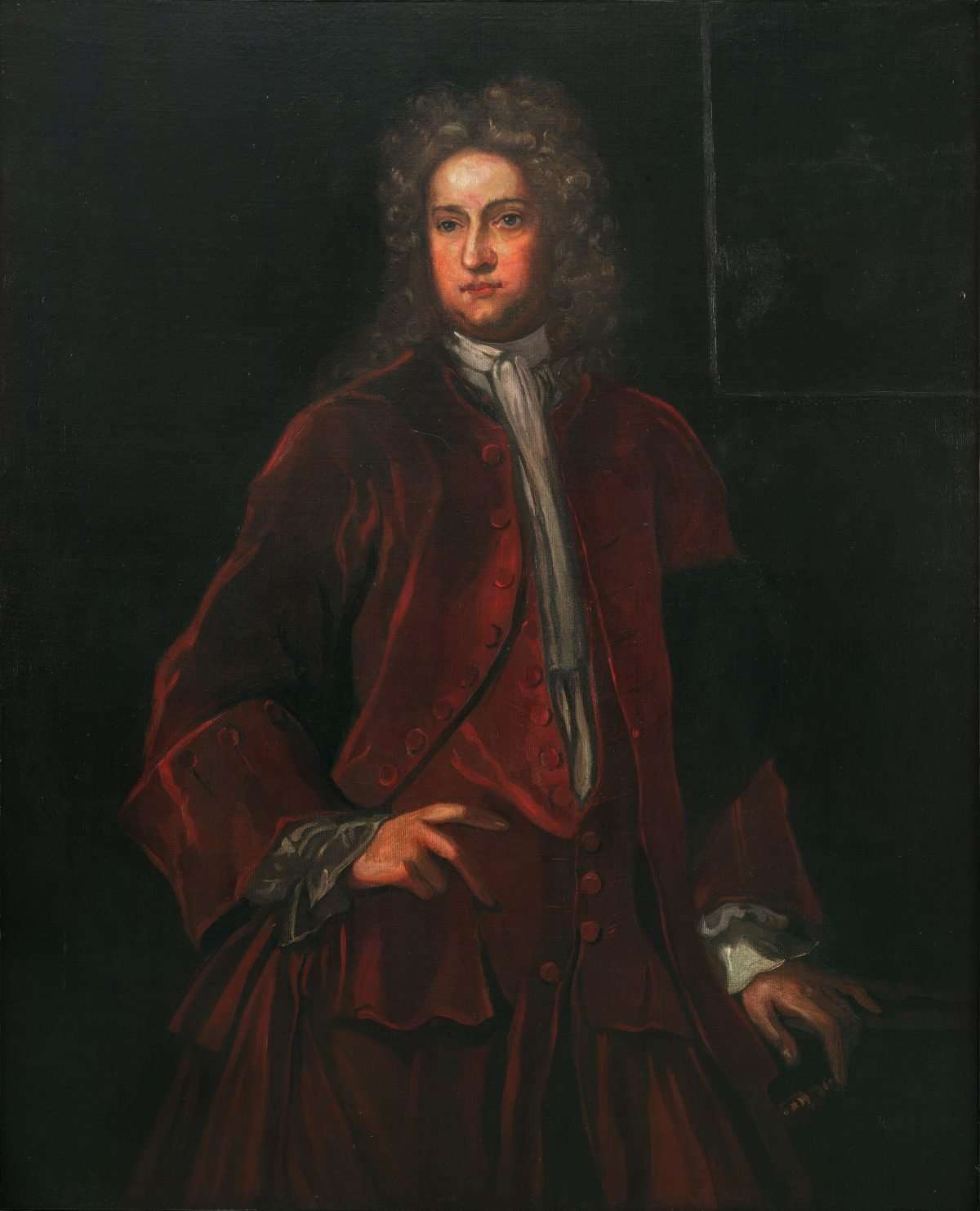
- Portrait of Berkeley

Governor of Virginia
- In office 1660–1677
- Appointed by: Charles II
- Preceded by: Samuel Mathews
- Succeeded by: Sir Herbert Jeffreys
- In office 1642–1652
- Appointed by: Charles I
- Preceded by: Sir Francis Wyatt
- Succeeded by: Richard Bennett

Personal details
- Born: 1605 Hanworth Manor, Middlesex, England
- Died: 9 July 1677 (aged 71–72) Berkeley House, Mayfair, England
- Resting place: St Mary's Church, Twickenham; Middlesex, England
- Spouse: Frances Culpeper Stephens Berkeley m. 1670
- Relatives: John Berkeley, 1st Baron Berkeley of Stratton (brother)
- Occupation: Planter
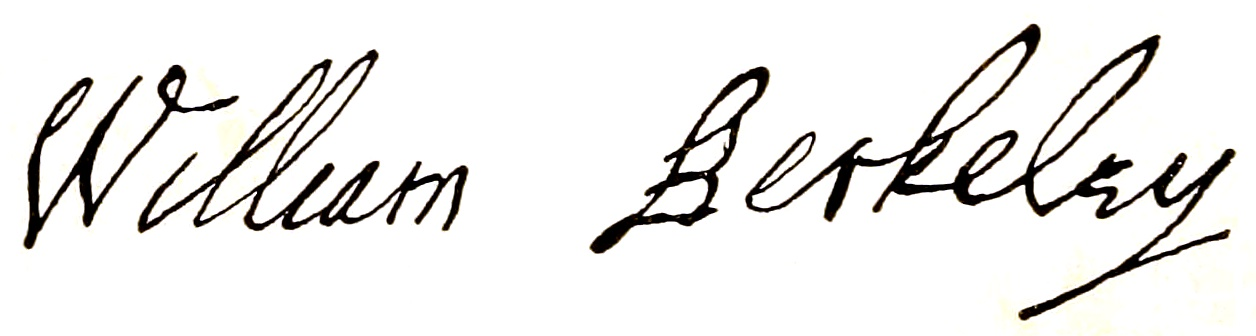
- Signature

Sir William Berkeley (/ˈbɑːrkliː/; 1605 – 9 July 1677) was an English colonial administrator who served as the governor of Virginia from 1660 to 1677. One of the Lords Proprietors of the Province of Carolina, as governor of Virginia he implemented policies that bred dissent among the colonists and sparked Bacon's Rebellion. A favourite of King Charles I, the king first granted him the governorship in 1642. Berkeley was unseated following the execution of Charles I, but his governorship was restored by King Charles II in 1660.

Charles II also named Berkeley one of the eight Lords Proprietors of Carolina, in recognition of his loyalty to the Stuarts during the English Civil War. As governor, Berkeley oversaw the implementation of a policy known as partus sequitur ventrem, which mandated that all babies born to enslaved parents take the legal status of their mother. As proprietor of Green Spring Plantation in James City County, he experimented with activities such as growing silkworms as part of his efforts to expand the tobacco-based economy. He also authored Discourse and View of Virginia, where he argued for diversifying the colony's tobacco economy.

== Early life ==
Berkeley was born in 1605 in Bruton, Somersetshire to Maurice Berkeley (died 1617) and Elizabeth Killigrew, of the Bruton branch of the Berkeley family, both of whom held stock in the Virginia Company of London. Referred to as "Will" by his family and friends, he was born in the winter of 1605 into landed gentry. His father died when he was twelve and, though indebted, left Berkeley land in Somerset. His elder brother was John Berkeley, 1st Baron Berkeley of Stratton.

Young Berkeley showed signs of a quick wit and broad learning. His informal education consisted of observing his elders; from them he learned "the moves that governed the larger English society and his privileged place in it". Also, as part of the English country gentry, he was aware of agricultural practices, knowledge which would influence his actions as governor of Virginia.

Though his father died in debt, Berkeley secured a proper education. He entered grammar school at about six or seven years old where he became literate in Latin and English. At eighteen, like the other Berkeley men, he entered Oxford. He began his studies at Queen's College in the footsteps of his forebears, but quickly transferred to St. Edmund Hall, a "throwback to medieval times". He received, though not necessarily completed, a B.A. in fifteen months of his arrival at the Hall.

All undergraduates at St. Edmund Hall received a personal tutor. While the identity of Berkeley's tutor is unsure, his effect upon the boy showed through William's "disciplined intellect and steady appetite for knowledge".

In 1632, he gained a place in the household of Charles I. That position gave him entré into a court literary circle known as "The Wits". Berkeley wrote several plays, one of which — The Lost Lady: A Tragy Comedy — was performed for Charles I and Henrietta Maria and was published in 1638. It is also included in the first and fourth editions of Dodsley's Old Plays, and A Description of Virginia (1663).

Soldiering in the First and Second Bishops' Wars (1639–1640) gained Berkeley a knighthood.

== First administration as governor ==
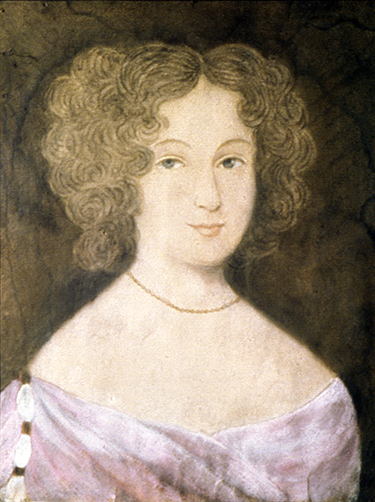
Portrait of Frances Culpeper Stephens Berkeley Ludwell by an unknown artist, c. 1660

Berkeley replaced Sir Francis Wyatt as governor of Virginia in 1641. He was governor of the colony of Virginia from 1641 to 1652 and from 1660 to 1677.

Berkeley's main initiative when he first became governor was to encourage diversification of Virginia's agricultural products. He accomplished this through passing laws and by setting himself up as an example for planters.

Arriving at Jamestown in 1642, Berkeley erected Green Spring House on a tract of land west of the capital, where he experimented with alternatives to tobacco. It was at Green Spring that he planted such diverse crops as corn, wheat, barley, rye, rape[seed], tobacco, oranges, lemons, grapes, sugar and silk. Berkeley devoted much of his time as a planter to experimenting with alternatives to tobacco; although he always produced the crop, he "despised" it. As a planter, with Virginia in mind, Berkeley constantly attempted to determine the best crops for the state through trial and error. Berkeley produced flax, fruits, potash, silk, and spirits which he exported through a commercial network that joined Green Spring to markets in North America, the West Indies, Great Britain, and Holland. Upon the recommendation of several of his slaves, Berkeley became a successful rice farmer. They were familiar with its cultivation from their native West Africa. He owned Boldrup Plantation.

== English Civil War and Commonwealth ==
When the parliamentarian army was successful in the civil war, defeating the royalists, Berkeley offered Virginia as an asylum to gentlemen on the royalist side. After the king was executed following trial in 1649, Berkeley dispatched his secretary of state Richard Lee I to the Dutch Republic to secure an extension of his office from the Crown Prince. That document proved worthless because Parliament dispatched a small fleet to the colony, and the governor, unable to offer resistance, was ultimately forced to resign his authority. However, Lee negotiated terms such that Berkeley received permission to remain on his own plantation as a private person.

At the Stuart monarchy's Restoration in 1660, Berkeley was reappointed governor.

== Second administration as governor ==
For Berkeley, the path towards Virginia's prosperity was fourfold: a diverse economy; free trade; a close-knit colonial society; and autonomy from London. He proceeded to turn this thought into action in various ways. In order to support a diversified economy and free trade, for instance, he used his own plantation as an example. Virginia's autonomy from London was supported in the General Assembly's role in the colony's governance. The Assembly was, in effect, a "miniature Parliament". The colony's autonomy from London was also advocated by Berkeley in his efforts against the revival of the Virginia Company of London.

Berkeley was "bitterly hostile" to Virginia's Puritans and Quakers. In an attempt to suppress them, Berkeley helped enact a law to "preserve the Established Church's [The Church of England] Unity and purity of doctrine". It punished any minister who preached outside the teachings and doctrine of this church, thus oppressing Puritans, Quakers, and any other religious minority.

Berkeley strongly opposed public education. Though he was unable to foresee the eventual establishment of such schools, he held that they would bring "disobedience, heresy, and sects into the world," and were for such reasons destructive to society. He also held printing at the same level as public education.

=== Bacon's Rebellion and downfall ===
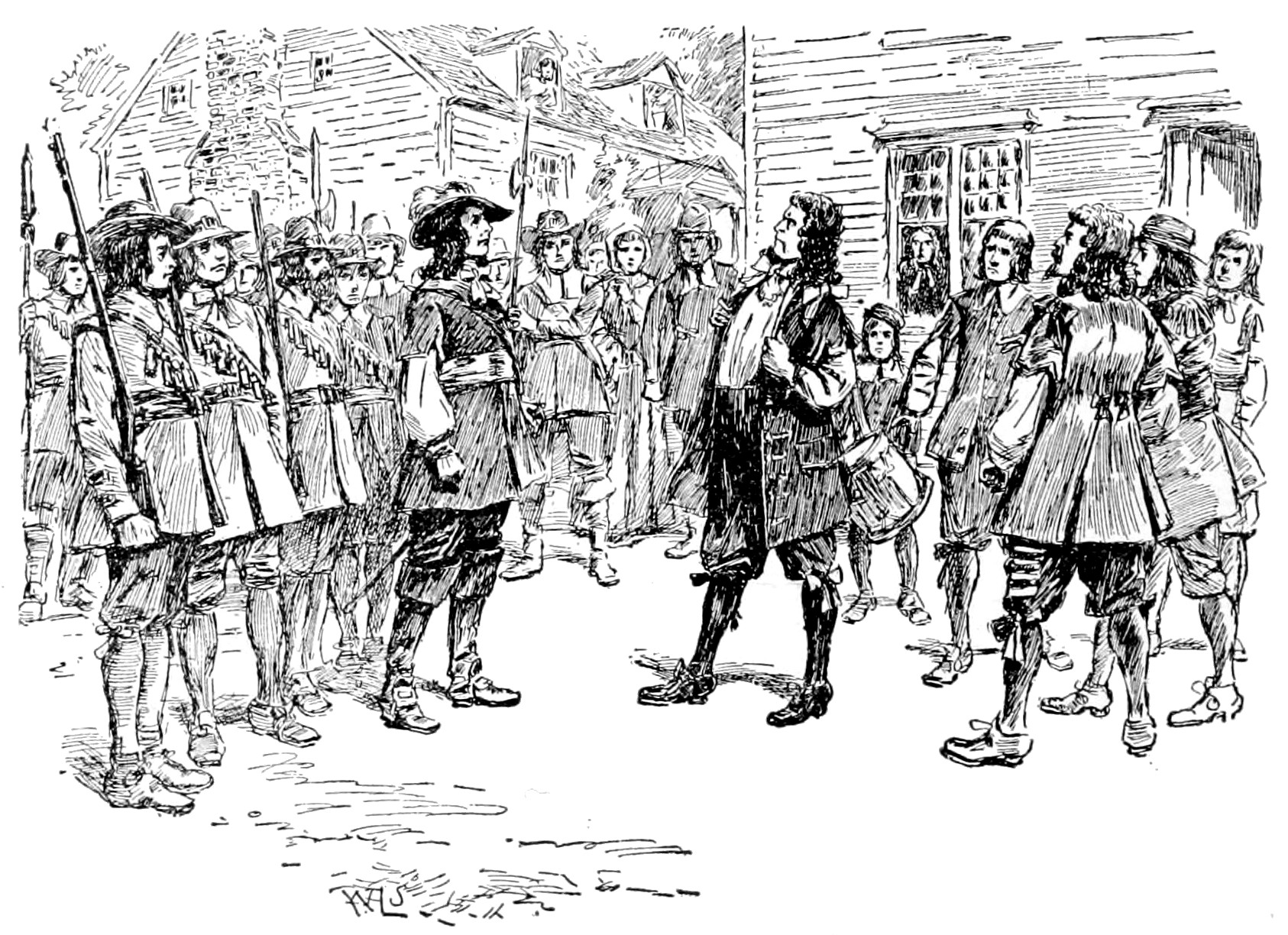
"A fair mark -- shoot", a depiction of a 1676 altercation between Berkeley (right) and Bacon (left)

Berkeley's downfall came with the advent of his second term. He returned from retirement in 1660 due to the early death of Governor Samuel Mathews. At his return, Berkeley appealed to England for financial support of Virginia's economy. Charles II denied Berkeley's appeal "in favour of free trade".

In 1675, Berkeley appointed Nathaniel Bacon, his wife's nephew, to Virginian high office.

Slow to respond to Indian attacks on white settlers, some viewed Berkeley as incompetent, making his authority easy to undermine. Disagreements over Indian policy led Bacon to rebel against Berkeley. Bacon accepted command of an illegal troop of Indian fighters and disregarded the governor's warning against leading the volunteers. "He declared Bacon a rebel, dissolved the General Assembly, and promised to remedy any complaints the voters had with him."

Bacon unexpectedly led 500 armed men into Jamestown and compelled the frightened legislators to appoint him general before he marched away in search of Indians to attack. His extortion of a general's commission turned a dispute over Indian policy into a duel to the death over who would control Virginia: Bacon or Berkeley.

"Berkeley defeated Bacon's invaders, which enabled him to return to the western shore and to retake his capital. Once reports of the revolt reached London, the crown sent 1,000 redcoats, ships, and a commission to crush Bacon. There was nothing for the troops to do because Berkeley had regained the upper hand. The rebellion ended before they arrived in January 1677. The Treaty of 1677, the formal peace treaty between the Indians and the colonists, was signed on 29 May 1677, after Berkeley returned to England."

== Death ==
Berkeley died in Berkeley House, Mayfair, England, on 9 July 1677, and he was "buried half a world away from the place that had become his home" in the crypt of St Mary's Church, Twickenham, where there is a memorial window to him and his brother, Lord Berkeley.

== Notes ==
- This article incorporates text from a publication now in the public domain: Bullen, Arthur Henry (1885). "Berkeley, William (d.1677)". In Stephen, Leslie (ed.). Dictionary of National Biography. Vol. 4. London: Smith, Elder & Co.

=== Further reading ===
- Hitchens, Harold Lee. "Sir William Berkeley, Virginian Economist." The William and Mary Quarterly 2nd ser. 18 (1938): 158–73. JSTOR. Sojourner Truth, New Paltz. 23 March 2009.
- Sydenstricker, Edgar, and Ammen Lewis Burger. School History of Virginia. Lynchburg: Dulaney-Boatwright, 1914.
- Biography in John T. Kneebone et al., eds., Dictionary of Virginia Biography (Richmond: The Library of Virginia, 1998– ), 1:454–458. ISBN 0-88490-189-0
- Chisholm, Hugh, ed. (1911). "Berkeley, Sir William" . Encyclopædia Britannica. Vol. 3 (11th ed.). Cambridge University Press.
- Albion's Seed

Government offices
Preceded by Francis Wyatt	Governor of Virginia; 1642–1652	Succeeded by Richard Bennett
Preceded by Samuel Mathews	Governor of Virginia; 1660–1677	Succeeded by 2nd Baron Colepeper
