= John Carter (Virginia colonial secretary) =

American planter and politician (1695–1742)

- Portrait, c. 1715–1726

Secretary of the Colony of Virginia
- In office June 21, 1722 – July 31, 1742

Virginia Governor's Council
- In office January 23, 1724 – November 3, 1741

Personal details
- Born: c. 1695 Corotoman Plantation, Lancaster County, Virginia
- Died: July 31, 1742 (aged 46–47) Shirley Plantation or Williamsburg, Virginia
- Spouse: Elizabeth Hill
- Children: Charles Hill Carter, Edward Hill Carter
- Parent(s): Robert Carter I, Judith Armistead
- Relatives: Charles Carter, Landon Carter (brothers); Robert Carter III nephew
- Education: Cambridge University; Middle Temple
- Profession: Lawyer, politician, bureaucrat

John Carter (circa 1695 – July 31, 1742) was a Virginia planter, lawyer, merchant and politician who served for two decades as the secretary of state for the Colony of Virginia, as well as for the Governor's Advisory Council (essentially the upper house of the Virginia General Assembly), but whose political career was overshadowed by that of his father Robert Carter, often nicknamed "King Carter" for his wealth and social and political prominence in the Colony of Virginia, with whom he served on the Governor's Council for nine years.

== Early life and education ==
Born in either 1695 or 1696 to the former Judith Armistead, probably at Corotoman, the home plantation of his wealthy father, Robert Carter, he became a prominent member (and ancestor) of the First Families of Virginia. His grandfather John Carter Sr. (who died in 1669 and for whom the boy was named) had established that plantation, and which was initially inherited by his uncle (John Carter Jr.), who raised his half-brother (this man's father) but died without male heirs. Before her death in 1698, when this John Carter was a young boy, his mother also gave birth to four daughters. Of these, Judith and Sarah died as infants, but Elizabeth (1692–1734) would marry twice, to burgesses Nathaniel Burwell of Gloucester County in 1709 (and received Carter's Grove plantation in Williamsburg from her father as their wedding present). Her second husband (whom she married in 1724) was Dr. George Nicholas of Williamsburg and the Royal Navy. His sister Judith (1695–1750) in 1718 married Mann Page, but their Rosewell plantation was still incomplete when he died, so this man (her brother) helped pay for and directed its completion.

Meanwhile, his father King Carter remarried twice more. Two years after his mother's death, John received his first stepmother, Betty Landon Willis (1684–1719), who gave birth to several more daughters (two of whom died as infants), as well as sons Charles (1707–1764), Robert Carter III, Landon and George Carter (1718–1741). While Ludlow Carter (c.1708) died as an infant and their youngest son, George, never married and died in England, the first three Landon/Carter sons also became major planters, with Charles Carter of Cleve and Landon Carter of Sabine Hall serving in the House of Burgesses (representing King George County and Richmond County, respectively), and Robert Carter II's son Robert Carter III of Nomini Hall serving decades on the Governor's Council (the legislature's upper house). Furthermore, the three surviving Landon/Carter daughters married burgesses, and several of their progeny held higher positions even than their uncles. Anne Carter (1702–1743) married Benjamin Harrison IV of Berkeley Plantation; Mary Carter (1712–1736) married George Braxton II of Newington plantation; and Lucy Carter (1715–1763) married Henry Fitzhugh of Eagles Nest plantation.

However, John Carter was not raised with his sisters and half-siblings, but instead was sent to England at age 12 for his education, first at a school run by Michael Mattaire at Ratliff hear Mile End, which his father had attended. While there, John lived with Arthur Bailey, Sr., the son of Capt. Arthur Bailey who had supervised his father's education and became his primary agent in London. Then John Carter studied law in the Middle Temple beginning in April 1713. He entered Trinity College of Cambridge University in January 1714 as a Fellow Commoner (the highest social rank), but never graduated. While there, he also supervised his three younger half brothers, and his father told him to find a schoolmistress for youngest half-siblings still at Corotoman. Among the small group of sons of Virginia planters in London, Carter lived well, and his spending aggravated his father, who reportedly wrote "To have spent so much money upon a dunce or a blockhead ... [would have been] most intolerable."

== Marriage and family ==
On October 3, 1723, Carter married Elizabeth Hill of Charles City County, descended from two Speakers of the House of Burgesses named Edward Hill, Edward Hill II and Edward Hill I. When her burgess father Edward Hill III died 3 years later, she inherited Shirley Plantation because her sole brother Edward Hill IV had died at age 16 from tuberculosis, and her father preferred this man's management style over that of his two other sons-in-law. This John Carter and Elizabeth had three sons and a daughter who lived to adulthood. Their daughter Elizabeth became the wife of nearby burgess William Byrd III (1728–1777). Their eldest son John was alive in 1728 and mentioned in King Carter's will. Perhaps the wealthiest of the lot became Charles (1728–1777), who not only expanded the family's plantations (and reliance of enslaved labor), but also the family's political prominence, for he represented Lancaster County in the House of Burgesses, as would his son Charles Jr. However, the most famous of that line would be Anne Hill Carter, who married General and future Virginia governor Lighthorse Harry Lee, who nearly liquidated her inheritance but sired future CSA General Robert E. Lee. Meanwhile, this John Carter's youngest son Edward Carter (1733–1792) moved west to inherited lands in Albemarle County, which he represented in the House of Burgesses and later the Virginia House of Delegates.

== Career ==
Carter represented his family's business interests in London during his time in England, and acted as his father's agent with Perry, Lane and Company. He was also admitted to the Inns of Court in 1722. Governor Spottswood with the concurrence of his Advisory Council (of which his father was a leading member) recommended Carter as solicitor of Virginia affairs in England on June 23, 1722, and this John Carter held that position for about a year until he returned to Virginia.

For 1500 pounds sterling Robert Carter bought an appointment for his firstborn son as secretary of the Virginia colony. John Carter received the appointment on June 21, 1722, and returned to Virginia that winter. The secretary's office, generally held for life at the time, was politically powerful as well as lucrative. Not only did the secretary keep the colony's records, he earned fees for more than sixty different services (especially recording land patents but also issuing writs for election of burgesses), as well as appointed all of the clerks for the county courts (and received part of the fees that each clerk received in lieu of a salary). By the time of his death, the position probably earned John Carter about 1,800 pounds sterling annually.

When a vacancy occurred on the Governor's Advisory Council, his father's influence helped John secure the lifetime appointment, on January 29, 1724, and they served together on the council for nine years. At his third Governor's Council meeting, John received a 6,000-acre tract of land on the north branch of the James River adjoining land of Col. Thomas Randolph, then in Goochland County, which later was split into Albemarle, Nelson and Amherst Counties. The following year, John Carter patented 9,350 acres in Albemarle County from the foot of Monticello Mountain south to the Hardware River (about 10 miles), and secured that land by building a mill and a road (later called the "Secretary's Road" across the "Secretary's Ford" of the Rivanna River, to the town of Bremo on the James River), as well as a claim house he named Clear Mount on the eastern side of what would be called "Carter's Mountain", and which his son Edward Carter would rebuild and name "Blenheim" in honor of the Duke of Marlborough's defeat of the Prussian army in Blenheim, Belgium in 1704. This John Carter would secure another 10,000 acre grant in Amherst and Nelson counties near the Piney and Buffalo Rivers in 1738.

From the time of his marriage in 1721 until his own death in 1742, John Carter lived at and managed the Hill family's Shirley Plantation on the James River, most believe with his father-in-law until that man's death sometime between 1721 and 1726. Shirley Plantation was much closer to the colonial government offices in Williamsburg. Furthermore, other powerful and intermarried families were nearby: the Byrd family at Westover Plantation and the Harrisons at Berkeley Plantation. Also, upon his father's death 1732 as discussed below, through primogeniture this John Carter inherited considerable property, including Corotoman plantation and hundreds of enslaved workers, as well as a mercantile business in Lancaster County that also traded West African slaves obtained from Liverpool merchants Samuel Powell and Foster Cunliffe. John Carter then divided his time between Shirley and Corotoman plantations, as well as a townhouse in the colonial capital, Williamsburg. His father's new mansion at Corotoman had burned a few years before his death and was not rebuilt, perhaps in part because the "Old House" had not been torn down and because of ongoing building projects on the other plantations discussed below, as well as Christ Church that his father had started. His wife Elizabeth wrote about the difficulties of moving her children and household between those locations, and by 1739, with most of his father's estate settled, this John Carter settled permanently at Shirley and left Corotoman in the hands of a reliable overseer. But John Carter's plantations inherited and acquired included 20,000 acres in Lancaster County, 6,000 acres in Essex county, 6,000 acres in Prince William counties (including tracts on Cedar Run, Broad Run and 10,000 acres on the Occoquan River), additional acreage in Richmond and Westmoreland and Northumberland Counties, and the lease of most of the Northern Neck Proprietary.

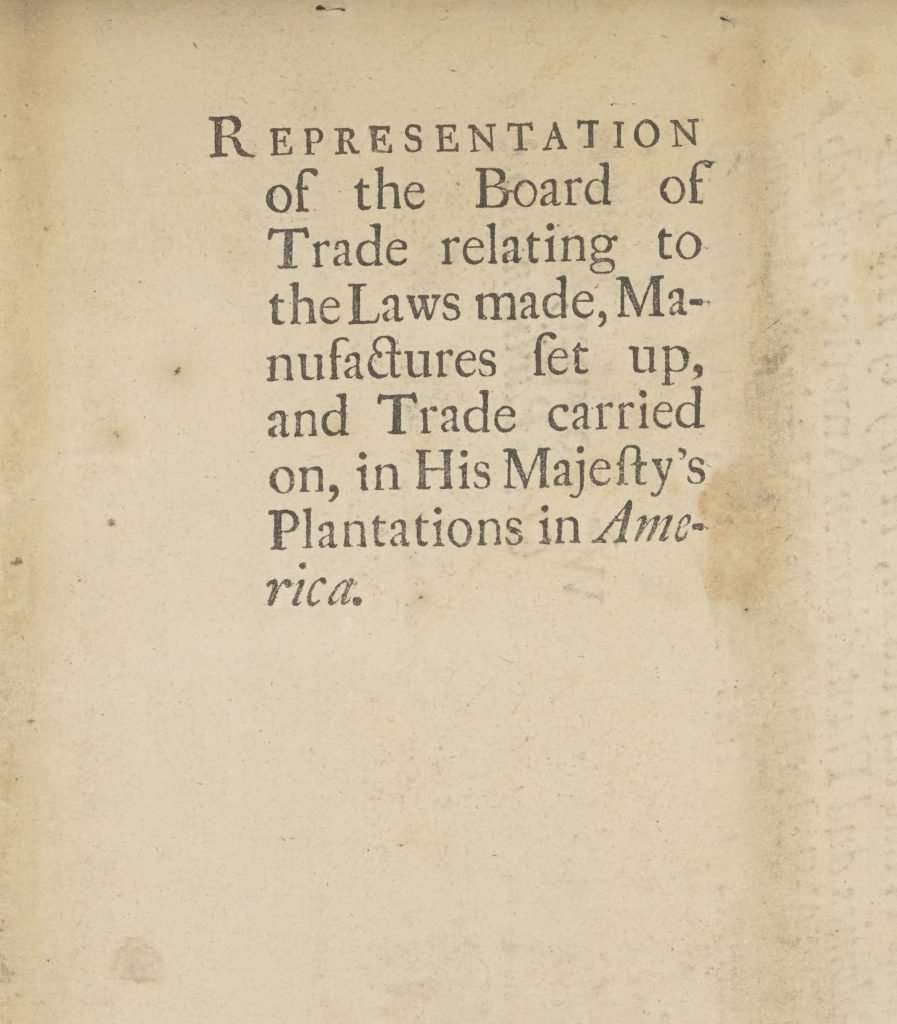
Report by the board of trade

However, the Carter family's power and wealth concerned some, including Lieutenant Governor Hugh Drysdale, who raised concerns with the Board of Trade in London. Despite Drysdale's death, the Board of Trade's inquiry in 1727 prompted Carter to defend the perquisites of his office, as well as his own conduct. Although he was not removed from either office, Carter failed to secure another lucrative post he sought that year, as deputy auditor of the royal revenue in the Virginia Colony.

After 1732, John Carter not only managed his father's enormous estate of 300,000 acres, more than 1,000 slaves and 10,000 pounds sterling (with his half brothers Landon of Sabine Hall and Charles of Cleve as co-executors), he also managed Ripon Hall on the York River, which was inherited by his young half-brother George, and was the executor of the estate of his late half-brother Robert (which included Nomini Hall and was inherited by the then-underage Robert Carter III), and the estate of his late brother-in-law Mann Page (Rosewell Hall, where his sister and co-executor Judith lived), and that of his sister Elizabeth's husband Dr. George Nicholas. Thus this John Carter raised Robert Carter Nicholas, orphaned in 1734. King Carter's will also appointed John Carter to inherit the agency relationship with the Fairfax and collect quitrents for the Northern Neck Proprietary. However, in England, the Northern Neck Proprietary's owner, Lord Thomas Fairfax had other ideas, and in 1733 appointed his nephew William Fairfax (then collector of customs of the Massachusetts colony) as his agent, and in 1735 Lord Fairfax arrived in Virginia, and John Carter paid his quitrents. Beginning the 1723, Secretary John Carter erected an elegant plantation house at Shirley, which was completed in 1738 and remains today. By the time of his death, this John Carter owned 52,000 acres of land. As was also common among the colony's ruling families of the era, Carter also raced thoroughbred horses and attended cockfights, presumably gambling on most of such events.

In his early forties, by 1741, Carter's health began to decline. He last attended the Governor's Council on November 3, 1741. During late 1741, Carter reportedly suffered from "Dropsy in the Belly". Either that illness worsened or another malady struck by July 1, 1742, when John Carter executed his (now-lost) last testament.

== Death and legacy ==
Carter died on July 31, 1742, although Governor William Gooch did not specify the precise location of his death when informing the Board of Trade of the now-vacant position. His widow, the former Elizabeth Hill Carter, remarried to burgess Bowler Cocke (1696-1711). However, Cocke did not become the guardian of Carter's underage sons, Charles and Edward who had been at William Yates' school in Gloucester County. Instead, they became wards of their uncle Landon Carter (with their orphaned cousin Robert Carter Nicholas) and would be enrolled at the College of William and Mary in Williamsburg by 1755.

The exact location of this man's burial is unknown. He may have been buried at Shirley Plantation, or at the Westover parish church, for no record of his burial exists at Christ Church in Lancaster County whose building he supervised but which would be rebuilt. Corotoman is now noted by a historical marker but Shirley plantation was restored, on the National Register of Historic Places, and hosts tours. Descendants also operate a winery adjacent to that estate house. The Carter Family letterbook and some other family papers are held by the University of Virginia library. The British Library maintains his appointment as secretary of state, and Governor William Gooch's notification to the Board of Trade of the secretary's death.
