= Robert Carter =

Robert or Bob Carter may refer to:

== Entertainers ==
- Robert Carter (ballet dancer), African-American ballet dancer
- Bob Carter (musician) (1922–1993), American jazz bassist and arranger born Robert Kahakalau
- Robert "Bob" Carter (1929–2013), aka Sammy Terry, Indianapolis horror host television personality

== Politicians ==
- Robert Carter I (1663–1732), American businessman and colonist in Virginia
- Robert Carter III (1727/8–1804), United States founding father
- Robert Wormeley Carter (1734–1797), Virginia planter, patriot and politician
- Robert W. Carter (1792–1861), Virginia planter and politician
- Robert Carter (magistrate) (1791–1872), naval officer and magistrate in colonial Newfoundland
- Robert Meek Carter (1814–1882), English politician, member of parliament for Leeds
- Bobby Carter (1939–2015), American politician
- Bob Carter (American politician), member of the Montana House of Representatives
- Robby Carter (born 1960), member of the Louisiana House of Representatives

== Publishing ==
- Robert Carter (publisher) (1807–1889), United States book publisher
- Robert Carter (editor) (1819–1879), United States editor

== Soldiers ==
- Robert Carter (RAF officer) (1910–2012), British military pilot
- Robert G. Carter (1845–1936), U.S. cavalry officer and Medal of Honor recipient
- Robert Randolph Carter (1825–1888), American naval officer

== Sportsmen ==
- Robert Carter (basketball) (born 1994), American basketball player
- Robert Carter (cricketer, born 1960), English cricketer for Northamptonshire, and for Canterbury in New Zealand
- Robert Carter (footballer) (1880–1928), English pre-war football player
- Robert Carter Jr. (gridiron football) (born 2003), American football cornerback
- Bob Carter (cricketer, born 1937), English cricketer for Worcestershire

== Others ==
- Robert Carter (priest) (1927–2010), Roman Catholic priest and gay rights activist
- Robert B. Carter (born 1960), American business executive with FedEx
- Robert Brudenell Carter (1828–1918), British physician and ophthalmic surgeon
- Robert L. Carter (1917–2012), civil rights activist, NAACP lawyer, and U.S. District Court judge
- Robert L. Carter (Illinois judge) (born 1946), former justice of the Illinois Supreme Court
- Robert M. Carter (1942–2016), English geologist and palaeontologist
- Rob Carter (born 1949), American professor of typography and graphic design
- Robert H. Carter III (1847–1908), American pharmacist
- Robert H. Carter (rheumatologist), American rheumatologist and physician-scientist
- Robert Eugene Carter (1929–1957), American man executed by the District of Columbia

== See also ==
- Robert Carver (disambiguation)
