= Charles Carter (of Cleve) =

American planter and politician (1707–1764)

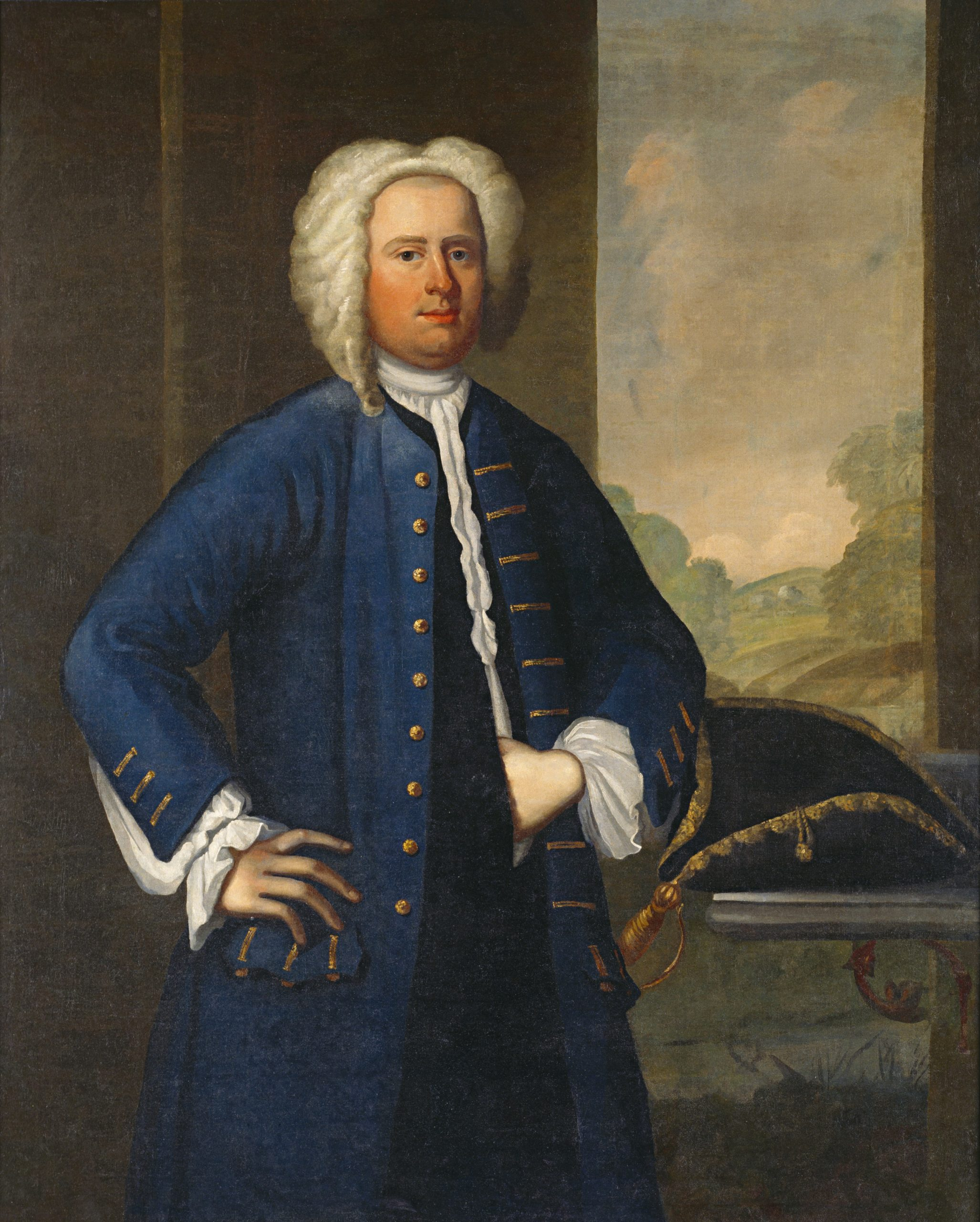
- Portrait, c. 1725–1730

Member of the House of Burgesses for King George County, Colony of Virginia
- In office 1736 – April 26, 1764 Serving with Thomas Turner, Henry Turner, Charles Carter Jr.
- Preceded by: John Champ
- Succeeded by: William Champe

Personal details
- Born: circa 1707 Coromaton plantation, Colony of Virginia
- Died: April 26, 1764 Virginia
- Spouse(s): Mary Walker (d.1742); Anne Byrd (d.1757); Lucy Taliaferro
- Children: 10 daughters and 2 sons including Charles Carter Jr.
- Parent(s): Robert Carter I, Elizabeth Landon Willis
- Relatives: Landon Carter (brother); John Carter (half-brother) Benjamin Harrison V (nephew)
- Education: in England
- Occupation: planter, politician

Charles Carter (1707 – April 26, 1764) was an American planter and politician. He was one of four men of the same name who served in the Virginia General Assembly during the late 18th and early 19th century. One historian has distinguished him as "of Cleve", the name of the plantation he developed in King George County, Virginia, which he represented in the House of Burgesses for nearly three decades, from 1736 until his death in 1764.

He was also an early Virginia winemaker. His son, also Charles Carter, but known for much of his lifetime as Charles Carter Jr., served alongside his father in the House of Burgesses representing King George County, and continued to serve until financially embarrassed following the death of their political ally, powerful speaker John Robinson. However, the younger man survived the resulting scandal concerning loans made from currency scheduled to be burned, having bought property in Stafford County and represented that county for many years, despite the American Revolutionary War and ongoing financial problems.

== Early and family life ==
Charles Carter was born to the former Elizabeth Landon Willis, the second wife of Robert Carter I, and likewise of the First Families of Virginia. His father was the richest man in Virginia in his lifetime, and so powerful based on his roles on the Governor's Council as well as land agent for the Northern Neck Proprietary and accumulated wealth that contemporaries nicknamed him "King Carter". The family included an elder half brother, John Carter (d. 1742), who succeeded his father on the Governor's Council and raised his half-siblings upon their father's death. He also had three full brothers: Robert Carter (who died four months before their father but was succeeded by his son Robert Carter III, whom this man helped raise and who would serve many years on the Governor's Council), Landon Carter and George Carter (who would die in London in 1742). Charles, Landon and George would all be educated in England, and both this man and Landon Carter in addition to operating their many plantations served in the House of Burgesses, as did Secretary John Carter's sons Charles Hill Carter and Edward Hill Carter. Most of their surviving sisters married burgesses and had sons who served in the Virginia General Assembly representing various counties, before, during and after the American Revolutionary War, including Carter Braxton, William Fitzhugh, Benjamin Harrison V, Thomas Nelson Jr., Robert Carter Nicholas Sr. and Mann Page II. Their aunt Elizabeth's son Lewis Burwell, 1711-1756 served for decades on the Governor's council and in 1750 became the colony's acting governor, and after this man's death, Carter Braxton and Benjamin Harrison V would become signers of the Declaration of Independence, and Mann Page III, Thomas Nelson Jr. and Benjamin Harrison V Governors of the new Commonwealth of Virginia.

Meanwhile, this Charles Carter married three times. By his first wife, Mary Walker Carter (d.1742), he had a son (Charles Carter Jr., who would serve with his father in the House of Burgesses but be disinherited), and three daughters (Judith Walker Carter, Elizabeth and Mary). Following her death, this Charles Carter married his ward, Anne Byrd (d.1757), daughter of Richard Byrd and who bore two sons. John Hill Carter of King George County married Philadelphia Claiborne of King William County in 1751 and supported the Patriot cause with at least supplies in 1777 but either died or moved from Virginia by 1787. His brother Landon Carter (of Cleve) in 1772 married Mildred Washington Willis, and after her death a decade later married his cousin Elizabeth Carter Thornton. The boys also had six full sisters before their mother's death: Anne Byrd Carter, Maria Carter, Lucy Carter, Jane Byrd Carter, Sarah Carter and Caroliana Carter. Carter again remarried, to Lucy Taliaferro (the 17-year-old daughter of a burgess who thus was younger than many of her stepsons), who survived him and bore a daughter, Ann Walker Carter.

== Career ==
Carter operated several plantations using enslaved labor, and exported tobacco to England. Initially, he operated his father's plantations in Middlesex County, where he became an ally of fellow planter John Robinson, who represented the county for decades in the House of Burgesses and became its Speaker. After his father's death, Charles Carter moved north to King George County, after buying a plantation he would develop and called "Cleve".

Carter held many local political offices, and continuously (but part-time, as was the custom) represented King George County in the House of Burgesses from 1736 until his death in 1764. He served alongside fellow planters Thomas Turner and Henry Turner for many years, and alongside his son Charles Carter Jr. from 1756 until his death in 1764 (although he would disinherit Charles in his 1762 will).

The Cleve manor house Carter commissioned and built was grand, and Carter entertained many dignitaries there. Not only was it built of brick, it featured carved stones around its windows and doors, as well as corner quoins. Carter also commissioned portraits of his family and ancestors from John Hesselius and other painters. However, that elegance barely survived the century, for fire gutted the interior in 1800, and another fire in 1917 caused its demolition.

Perhaps more noteworthy were Carter's winemaking efforts. Following a collapse in tobacco prices, and aware of that crop's high nutrient demands, Carter experimented with wine grapes, and corresponded with English wine expert Peter Wyche. In 1761, Wyche wrote Carter about the poor quality of American grapes and how another winemaker had failed, but offered to send Carter European vines. However, Carter was already managing to grow over a thousand European-derived vines on his Cleve property, as well as making palatable wine. Perhaps to show Wyche wrong, the following year (two years before Carter's death), Carter sent the London Society for the Encouragement of the Arts a dozen bottles of his wine, made from a blend of juices of an American grape and a white Portugal summer grape. The Society awarded Carter a gold medal for his effort, and in August 1763, Governor Francis Fauquier reviewed a report of several eminent men who visited Cleve and praised both the red and white wines made from European stock. In 1768, several years after this man's death, Virginians exported 135 gallons of wine to England, but the General Assembly's ambitious 1769 plan to hire a French winemaker to establish a vineyard east of Williamsburg failed. Perhaps inspired by accounts of this late planter's success, in 1771 Thomas Jefferson planted 5 grape vines sent to him by his mentor George Wythe in Albemarle County, but despite also luring Italian winemaker Filippo Mazzei to Albemarle County in 1773, that winemaking experiment also failed.

== Death and legacy ==
Carter died on April 26, 1764, leaving behind a widow and several children, some under legal age. His nephew William Fitzhugh (son of this man's sister) had more success both as a planter and politician, and represented King George County during the American Revolutionary War.

While the planter wanted all his sons to study law, that course proved problematic, for his 1762 will was contested. While his firstborn son Charles Carter Jr. continued his father's political efforts, he continued to fail economically as a planter. However, with the assistance of political allies, Charles Jr. successfully contested his disinheritance in the General Court, then sold the contested property in King George County and moved to Stafford County. Charles Jr.'s legal success may have caused his uncle Edward Carter to enlist Thomas Jefferson's assistance in dismantling the entail system because of financial problems with his own son. In any event, this man's eldest son by his next wife, John Hill Carter (perhaps named to honor his uncle who never reached legal age) married Philadelphia Claiborne of King William County in 1771 and assisted the patriots in the American Revolutionary War. Although claimed reimbursement for provisions supplied to patriots in 1777, as well as fathered a daughter Anne who married lawyer John Lyon, he was dead or left the Commonwealth by 1787. The son continuing his man's traditions as a planter and legislator was his youngest son, Landon Carter (1751-1811) named to honor his uncle, who also became his guardian until he reached legal age. He would marry twice, first to Mildred Washington Willis (who died in 1778), then to his widowed cousin, Elizabeth Carter Thornton, daughter of his brother Landon Carter's firstborn son and successor Robert Wormeley Carter. By 1787, Landon Carter of King George held what remained of his father's formerly extensive plantations in King George County. He paid taxes on 47 enslaved laborers and 42 enslaved children, as well as 27 horses and 159 other livestock. Some of the Carter family papers are held by the University of Virginia library. Decades after Charles Carter's death, in 2008, a lawyer descendant, Philip Carter Strother, decided to honor this ancestor by buying a winery in Fauquier County, which he renamed the Philip Carter winery, and named some wines after Cleve.
