= Edward Dale =

Edward Dale may refer to:

- Edward Dale (burgess) (died c. 1695), Virginia politician
- Edward Everett Dale (1879–1972), American historian
