= Robert W. Carter =

American politician (1792–1861)

Member of the Virginia Senate for Stafford, King George, Westmoreland, Lancaster, Northumberland and Richmond Counties, Virginia
- In office January 1, 1838 – November 30, 1845
- Preceded by: William Basye
- Succeeded by: James M. Smith

Member of the Virginia House of Delegates for Richmond and Westmoreland Counties, Virginia
- In office December 7, 1857 – December 4, 1859
- Preceded by: Landon C. Berkeley
- Succeeded by: Joseph F. Harvey

Member of the Virginia House of Delegates for Lancaster and Richmond Counties, Virginia
- In office December 7, 1835 – December 31, 1837
- Preceded by: Morris Emmanuel
- Succeeded by: Valentine Y. Conway
- In office December 5, 1831 – December 1, 1833
- Preceded by: seat created
- Succeeded by: Joseph A. Carter

Member of the Virginia House of Delegates for Richmond County, Colony of Virginia
- In office December 3, 1827 – December 6, 1829 Serving with Thomas R. Barnes
- Preceded by: Augustine Neale
- Succeeded by: Carter Mitchell
- In office December 3, 1821 – December 3, 1826 Serving with Vincent Branham
- Preceded by: Moore Fauntleroy Brockenbaugh
- Succeeded by: Augustine Neale

Personal details
- Born: January 1, 1792 Sabine Hall, Richmond County, Colony of Virginia
- Died: October 27, 1861 (aged 69) Sabine Hall, Richmond County, Virginia
- Spouse: Elizabeth M. Tayloe
- Children: Elizabeth Carter Wellford
- Parent(s): Landon Carter (of Sabine Hall), Catherine Griffin Tayloe
- Relatives: Landon Carter (great-grandfather); Robert Wormeley Carter (grandfather); Robert Carter Wellford(grandson)
- Occupation: planter, politician

Robert Wormeley Carter II (January 1, 1792 – October 27, 1861) was a Virginia planter who served multiple terms in both houses of the Virginia General Assembly. In his early and last terms, he represented his native Richmond County in the Virginia House of Delegates (as had his grandfather of the same name), then for eight years represented the counties of the Northern Neck of Virginia in the Virginia Senate (roughly the successor of the Governor's Council on which his great-great-grandfather, King Carter served for many years a century earlier).

== Early life ==
Born into the First Families of Virginia on New Year's Day in 1792 at his father's family seat, Sabine Hall. He was named to honor his grandfather Robert Wormeley Carter (who would die five years later) and great-great-grandfather Robert Carter I. His mother was Catherine Griffin Tayloe (1761–1798) the daughter of John Tayloe II who bore four daughters before dying when Robert was still a boy. Only two of those sisters reached adulthood, Lucy Carter (wife of William Travers and later Thomas Beale Hamilton) and Anne Catherine Carter (wife of Williamson Ball Tomlin). His father remarried in 1800, to Mary Burwell Armistead, daughter of John Armistead and Lucy Baylor, with whom he would have four more children, John Armistead Carter (husband of Richardetta DeButts and later a State legislator for Loudoun County), Frances Addison Carter (wife of Major Henry Rozier Dulany of Alexandria), Mary Landon Carter (wife of William A. Eliason) and Landon Carter who would die at the age of 23.

Robert W. Carter married his cousin Elizabeth Merry Tayloe, the daughter of John Tayloe III a planter and state senator. Before her death in 1832, she bore a daughter, Elizabeth Landon Carter, who married Dr. Armistead Wellford. Their son R. Carter Wellford (1853–1919) would inherit Sabine Hall and continued the family's tradition of legislative service at the close of the 19th century.

== Career ==
Like his father and grandfather, Robert Wormeley Carter was groomed to take control of working plantations, which were operated using enslaved labor. Like his great-grandfather Landon Carter, Robert W. Carter was known for his scientific farming techniques, including mixing imported guano with soil from his marsh lands to fertilize his fields, which technique he shared with his father in law John Tayloe (1771–1838) of nearby Mt. Airy plantation. In 1830, Carter was one of Richmond county's largest slaveowners, with 103 enslaved people, and the number grew to 115 slaves in the 1840 federal census. In the 1850 census, which included separate slave schedules, Carter owned 105 enslaved people, and 136 enslaved people in the final federal census of his lifetime (including 1 blind girl).

Richmond County voters first elected Robert W. Carter (who was a Whig as one of their (part-time) representatives in the Virginia House of Delegates alongside veteran Vincent Branham in 1821, and re-elected the pair until 1826, when neither won re-election. After a year's gap, Carter regained his seat, this time alongside Thomas R. Barnes (likewise of a well-established local family), and both were re-elected until 1829, when only Barnes won re-election. Carter again won a seat in the House of Delegates in 1831, following the adoption of a new state constitution following the convention of 1830, and a re-organization which combined Richmond and Lancaster Counties and gave them only one (joint) seat.

In 1837, Carter won election to the Virginia Senate, representing the five counties in the Northern Neck of Virginia, and was re-elected to another four-year term. In October 1845, James M. Smith of Northumberland County defeated Carter. Carter served his final legislative term in the House of Delegates in 1857, representing both Richmond and neighboring Westmoreland Counties.

Carter remodeled Sabine Hall in the 1840s. He also became known for breeding horses (including using imported breeding stock; one of his stud horses in the 1850s was "Senator"). In the 1850s when nearby Essex County formed its first bank, Carter became its first president.

== Death and legacy ==
Carter died during the American Civil War on October 27, 1861. He was buried at Sabine Hall, which his young grandson would ultimately inherit, as well as continue the family's legislative tradition. Sabine Hall was listed on the National Register of Historic Places in 1969. Many of the family's papers are held by the University of Virginia library.
