= Charles Hill Carter =

American planter and politician (1732–1806)

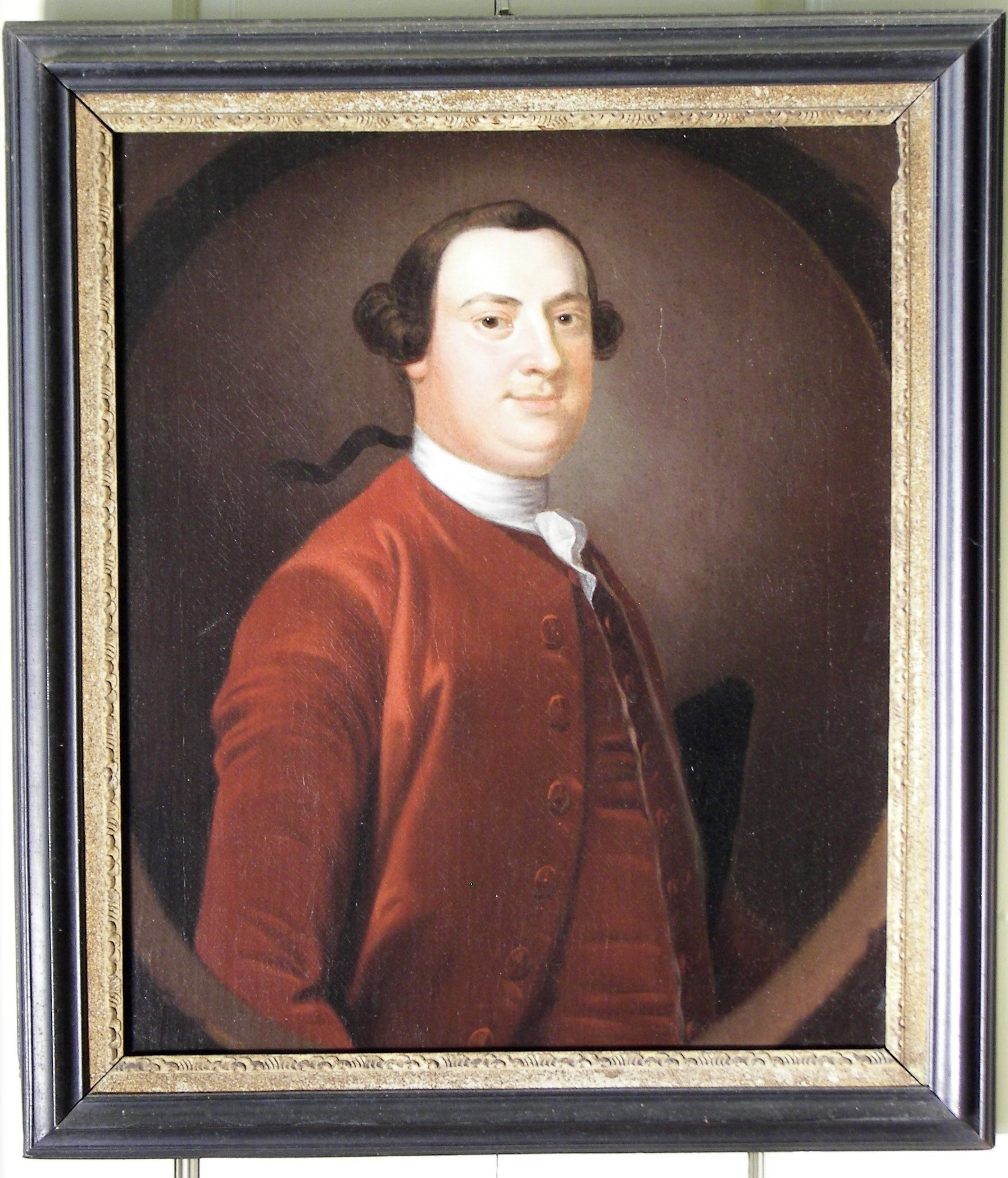
- Portrait by John Wollaston, c. 1755–1758

Member of the House of Burgesses for Lancaster County
- In office 1758–1775 Serving with William Ball, George Healey, Richard Mitchell, James Ball, James Selden
- Preceded by: Richard Selden
- Succeeded by: position ended

Personal details
- Born: 1732 Shirley Plantation, Charles City County, Colony of Virginia
- Died: June 28, 1806 (aged 73–74) Shirley Plantation
- Resting place: Shirley Plantation or Westover Parish Church
- Spouse(s): Mary Carter; Ann Butler Moore
- Parent(s): John Carter, Elizabeth Hill
- Relatives: "King" Carter (grandfather), Edward Hill (great grandfather), Landon Carter (uncle), Robert Carter III (uncle), Charles Carter (of Ludlow) (cousin)
- Occupation: planter, politician

Charles Hill Carter (1732 – June 28, 1806) was a Virginia planter who represented Lancaster County in the Virginia House of Burgesses (1758–1775) and all five of the Virginia Revolutionary Conventions, and also sat on the first Council of State in 1776.

== Early life and family ==
He was born at Shirley Plantation to the former Elizabeth Hill, who had been born to the last of three generations of men named Edward Hill to operate that plantation and represent surrounding Charles City County in the House of Burgesses. His great-grandfather had also served as its Speaker. Around the time that her brother, also Edward Hill, had died of tuberculosis at age 16, Elizabeth had married John Carter, the colony's secretary of state and son of King Carter, probably the colony's wealthiest and most powerful man. Her father selected her (and her husband) to inherit Shirley plantation, instead of either of her two elder sisters. His elder brother would be named John (and was alive in 1728 and mentioned in King Carter's will) and his younger brother named Edward would also follow the family's planter and politician traditions, serving in both the House of Burgesses and later in the Virginia House of Delegates representing Albemarle County. Their sister Elizabeth became the wife of nearby burgess William Byrd III (1728–1777), and among their children was powerful politician William Byrd IV.

Charles Hill Carter married twice. His first wife, Mary Carter, was his cousin, daughter of Charles Carter of Cleve. Before she died in 1770, they had four sons who reached adulthood: John Hill Carter (1757 until after 1777), George (1761–1788, who married Lelia, the daughter of Sir Peyton Skipwith), Charles B. Carter (1766–1807, who married his cousin Nancy Beale Carter and lived at "Mt. Atlas"), and Edward Carter (1767–1806, of "Cloverland" in Prince William County who married his cousin Janet Carter (daughter of John Carter of "Sudley") and served in the House of Delegates representing Prince William County). Charles and Mary also had at least three sons who died as infants (Charles William, Landon, and Robert) and two daughters who married and bore many descendants: Mary Walker Carter (1763-1836) married her cousin George Braxton of "Hybla" (1762-1801; son of founding father Carter Braxton), and Elizabeth Hill Carter (1767–1832) married Col. Robert Randolph (1760–1825) of Eastern View plantation in Fauquier County). After a suitable mourning period, Charles Hill Carter remarried, to Ann Butler Moore, daughter of burgess Bernard Moore of Chelsea plantation in King William County, and wife Ann Catherine Spotswood. Their son Dr. Robert Carter (1774–1805 married Mary Nelson of York County who bore Hill Carter (1796-1870 ) who inherited Shirley plantation as would his son Charles Carter (1827-1906), although the most famous descendant would be of daughter Anne Hill Carter (1773-1829), who became the second wife of General and Virginia governor Lighthorse Henry Lee and now most famous as mother of CSA General Robert E. Lee and grandmother of future general and Virginia governor Fitzhugh Lee

== Career ==
Upon reaching legal age, this Charles Carter initially operated Shirley Plantation, which his father (who died when this boy was ten) then stepfather Bowler Cocke operated (using overseers) until Charles reached legal age. The firstborn son inherited it under entail and primogeniture from his maternal grandfather, Edward Hill III (who died in 1726, before his grandson's birth). Previous generations of the Hill family had operated Shirley and other plantations using a combination of indentured and enslaved labor. However, by this man's lifetime, few Englishmen were willing to emigrate to the colony under indenture contracts, so the labor force was primarily enslaved. According to the first Virginia tax census following the American Revolutionary War, in 1787, Charles Hill Carter owned 67 enslaved people above age 16 at Shirley Plantation. He also paid taxes on another 67 younger slaves, 16 horses, and 70 cattle on that plantation. He had another 16 adult slaves, 22 enslaved children, and additional livestock at his Long Bridge plantation in the same county.

Charles Carter also inherited and acquired plantations in other Virginia counties. Although his distinguishing nickname reflected the Shirley Plantation of his birth, this Carter also inherited his father's (and grandfather's) primary plantation known as Corotoman in Lancaster County. This Charles Carter also bought "Nanzitico" plantation even further north in Virginia's Tidewater region, in King George County from his cousin (and sometime Stafford County burgess) Charles Carter (of Ludlow). Like at Shirley, this Carter farmed these and other plantations using enslaved labor, and became one of Virginia's wealthiest men of his era.

Charles Carter began his political career by representing Lancaster County in the House of Burgesses in 1758, and continued to win re-election to every subsequent session, until Lord Dunmore suppressed the colony's legislature in 1775. Charles Carter and fellow planter James Selden then represented Lancaster County in each of the five revolutionary Virginia Conventions. During this period, future Virginia governors Benjamin Harrison (also signer of the Continental Association and the Declaration of Independence) and John Tyler Sr. (a friend and former college roommate of future Virginia governor and U.S. President Thomas Jefferson of Berkeley and Greenway plantations in Charles City County) had similar continual re-election streaks representing Charles City County.
