= R. Carter Wellford =

American politician

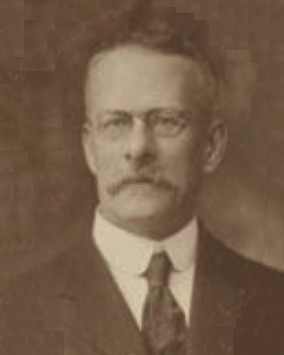

Member of the Virginia House of Delegates for Lancaster and Richmond
- In office January 12, 1910 – January 10, 1912
- Preceded by: John Curlett
- Succeeded by: Robert O. Norris Jr.
- In office December 1, 1897 – December 4, 1901
- Preceded by: Howard Hathaway
- Succeeded by: John M. Lyell

Personal details
- Born: Robert Carter Wellford; August 27, 1853 Warsaw, Virginia, U.S.
- Died: April 21, 1919 (aged 65) Warsaw, Virginia, U.S.
- Party: Democratic
- Spouse: Lizzie Harrison (m. 1878)
- Parent: Elizabeth Landon Carter
- Education: University of Virginia
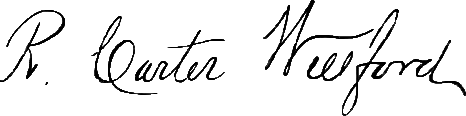
- Signature

Robert Carter Wellford (August 27, 1853 – April 21, 1919) was an American politician who served in the Virginia House of Delegates, representing Lancaster and Richmond counties. Wellford was president of the Northern Neck Telephone and Telegraph Company and vice-president of the Northern Neck State Bank.

Robert Carter Wellford was the son of Dr. Armistead Nelson Wellford (1826-18840 and Elizabeth Landon Carter (1830-1858) and the oldest grandson of Robert Wormley Carter. He was also a grandson of Beverly R. Wellford. A descendant of Robert Carter I, he lived at historic Sabine Hall, now a National Historic Landmark, until his death. He was a second cousin, thrice removed of President Thomas Jefferson.

== Personal life ==
Robert Carter Wellford married his fifth cousin Elizabeth Cunningham Harrison Wellford (1853-1926). She was a first cousin, thrice removed of Presidents Thomas Jefferson and William Henry Harrison, 3rd cousin, once removed of President Benjamin Harrison, and first cousin, once removed of General George Pickett.

They had six children. Their oldest son was Armistead Nelson Wellford, who married Catherine Burdette Davis. Her 3rd great-uncle was Jefferson. Robert and Elizabeth's daughter, Caroline Randolph Wellford, married Frank Barksdale Guest on November 6, 1907. He was a descendant of Pocahontas. Their daughter (Robert's granddaughter), Elisabeth Carter Guest, married Herman Hollerith Jr., son of Herman Hollerith.

Their third child, William Harrison Wellford, married his 3rd cousin, Ida Dulany Beverley. They had a son, Robert Carter Wellford III, who carried on the name; and another son, Hill Carter Beverley Wellford, who married his cousin Mary Magill Randolph Turner. Their fourth child, Robert Carter Wellford Jr., died at the age of 20.

Their fifth child, another daughter, Elizabeth Landon Wellford, married Thomas Norman Jones, Jr., on October 18, 1911. A son, John Harrison Wellford, married Marion Henrickson in October 1915. They had six children.

Robert Carter Wellford died on April 21, 1919.
