= Robert Carter Jr. =

Robert Carter Jr. may refer to:

- Robert Carter (basketball) (born 1994), American basketball player
- Robert Carter Jr. (gridiron football) (born 2003), American football cornerback

== See also ==
- Robert Carter (disambiguation)
