= Landon Carter (of Cleve) =

Virginian planter and politician (1751-1811)

Landon Carter of Cleve

Member of the Virginia House of Delegates for King George County, Colony of Virginia
- In office May 1, 1780 – May 6, 1781 Serving with Joseph Jones
- Preceded by: John Washington
- Succeeded by: Woffendall Kendall

Personal details
- Born: 1751 Coromaton plantation, Colony of Virginia
- Died: 1811 (aged 59–60) Virginia
- Spouse(s): Mildred Washington Willis (d. 1778); Elizabeth Carter Thornton (1758-1840)
- Children: 4 daughters and 2 sons
- Parent(s): Charles Carter (of Cleve), Ann Byrd Carter, Elizabeth Landon Willis
- Relatives: Landon Carter (uncle); Charles Carter (of Ludlow) (brother); Charles Carter (of Sabine Hall) (cousin and brother-in-law)
- Occupation: planter, politician

Landon Carter (1751-1811) was a Virginia planter who also served one term in the Virginia House of Delegates representing King George County, Virginia, one of three men of the same name who served in the Virginia General Assembly during the late 18th century.

== Early and family life ==
The son of Charles Carter (of Cleve) (who represented King George County part-time in the House of Burgesses for three decades) and his second wife, Anne Byrd (daughter of burgess William Byrd II), this Landon Carter was born in 1751 to the First Families of Virginia. He had not yet reached legal age to inherit property when his father died in 1762, leaving him and his slightly older brother John Hill Carter orphaned. His surviving uncle, Landon Carter, who had represented Richmond County for decades in the House of Burgesses, was appointed their guardian. [Complicating matters, that Landon Carter also had a son named Landon and a grandson by his firstborn son Robert Wormeley Carter also named Landon].

== Career ==
His father, Charles Carter of Cleve had attempted to protect his namesake estate by disinheriting his surviving son by his first wife Charles Carter Jr. by his will prepared in 1762, because of the young man's financial extravagance and having already paid many debts incurred by that son. However, after their father's death Charles Jr. successfully challenged the will and inherited property that their father had planned to bequeath to his younger sons and their several sisters.

By 1787, Landon Carter of King George held what remained of his father's formerly extensive plantations in King George County. He paid taxes on 47 enslaved laborers and 42 enslaved children, as well as 27 horses and 159 other livestock.

== Personal life ==
This Landon Carter married twice. In 1772 he married Mildred Washington Willis, daughter of Col. Lewis Willis and the former Mary Champe of King George County. Before she died in 1778, she had given birth to three daughters, of whom Mary Champe Carter died as an infant, Mildred Ann Byrd Carter (1774-1837) would marry first Robert Mercer (1764-1800, who represented Stafford County in the House of Delegates), then John Lewis (1747-1824, son of Col. Fielding Lewis and Catherine Washington Lewis), and bear sons by each marriage; and Lucy Landon Carter (1776-1859) who married Gen. John Minor of Hazel Hill (who died in 1816). His second wife and cousin (daughter of Robert Wormeley Carter and sister of Landon Carter (of Sabine Hall) sometimes confused with this man), would bear sons Robert Charles Carter (1783-1849) and St. Leger Landon Carter of Cleve (1785-1850) and daughter Eliza Travers Carter (1787- ) who married William McFarlane.

== Death and legacy ==
This Landon Carter died in 1811 and is buried at Cleve. Although the mansion which was gutted by fire in his lifetime was pulled down a century later after further deterioration, some of the family's papers are held by the University of Virginia library.
