= William Fitzhugh =

American politician (1741–1809)

- Portrait by John Hesselius, c. 1765–1771

Delegate to the Second Continental Congress from Virginia
- In office September 12, 1779 – October 31, 1779

Member of the Virginia House of Delegates from Stafford County
- In office October 15, 1787 – June 22, 1788 Serving with Bailey Washington Jr.
- Preceded by: Gustavus Brown Wallace
- Succeeded by: Richard Brent

Member of the Virginia Senate from Westmoreland, Stafford and King George Counties
- In office May 7, 1781 – October 17, 1785
- Preceded by: William Brent
- Succeeded by: Thomas Lee

Member of the Virginia House of Delegates from Stafford County
- In office May 1, 1780 – May 6, 1781 Serving with Bailey Washington
- Preceded by: Charles Carter
- Succeeded by: Thomas Mountjoy
- In office May 5, 1777 – May 3, 1778 Serving with Charles Carter
- Preceded by: n/a
- Succeeded by: William Brent

Member of the Virginia House of Delegates from King George County
- In office October 7, 1776 – May 4, 1778 Serving with Joseph Jones
- Succeeded by: Thomas Jett

Member of the 1st, 2nd, 3rd, 4th and 5th Virginia Revolutionary Conventions from King George County
- In office 1774–1776 Serving with Joseph Jones

Member of the House of Burgesses from King George County
- In office 1772–1774 Serving with Joseph Jones
- Preceded by: William Robinson
- Succeeded by: n/a

Personal details
- Born: August 24, 1741 King George, Virginia, British America
- Died: June 6, 1809 (aged 67) Fairfax County, Virginia, U.S.
- Resting place: Pohick Church Cemetery; Lorton, Virginia, U.S.
- Party: Federalist
- Spouse: Ann Bolling Randolph (died 1805)

William Fitzhugh (August 24, 1741 – June 6, 1809) was an American planter, enslaver, legislator and patriot during the American Revolutionary War who served as a delegate to the Continental Congress for Virginia in 1779, as well as many terms in the House of Burgesses and both houses of the Virginia General Assembly following the Commonwealth's formation. His Stafford County home, Chatham Manor, is on the National Register for Historic Places and serves as the National Park Service Headquarters for the Fredericksburg and Spotsylvania National Military Park.

== Early and family life ==
Coat of arms of William Fitzhugh

Born into the First Families of Virginia, Fitzhugh was born in King George County, Virginia, where his father owned large estates, largely acquired by the latter's grandfather before the county's creation. His family traced its descent from Bardolph, Lord of Ravensworth in Richmondshire in the time of William the Conqueror. His great-grandfather, also William Fitzhugh (1650–1701), immigrated from England to Virginia from England about 1671, became a successful lawyer and tobacco planter as well the first member of the family to sit in the House of Burgesses (in 1677). He established "Bedford" plantation as his family's seat (which was later destroyed in the Civil War) and by the time he died in 1701, owned 54,000 acres (220 km^{2}) mostly in the Northern Neck of Virginia, most of which this man inherited. His brother Henry Fitzhugh would also serve in the House of Burgesses and became high sheriff of Stafford County in 1715. William Fitzhugh's son (also William Fitzhugh, sometimes distinguished as "of Eagle's Nest"), also served as a burgess before his death in 1714.

The second William Fitzhugh's eldest son, Henry Fitzhugh, studied at Oxford University and also served in the House of Burgesses in 1738, 1740 and 1742 representing Stafford County. In 1730, he married Lucy Carter in 1730 and became the father of two daughters and this man, who was a baby when his father died in 1742. Henry Fitzhugh's eldest daughter could not inherit land by primogeniture, but married Benjamin Grymes of Spotsylvania County, who served in the House of Burgesses as did their descendants in the Virginia General Assembly. This man's mother, the widow Lucy Carter Fitzhugh, a daughter of Robert "King" Carter (the largest landowner in Virginia in his lifetime, and who also provided for several other children) remarried to the widower Colonel Nathaniel Harrison of "Brandon" in Prince George County, Virginia, who would serve in the Virginia Senate even though the couple had no additional children. This man, William Fitzhugh of Chatham received a private education suitable to his class. He lost an eye in a childhood accident, hit by one of his Harrison stepbrothers with a horse riding crop. Fitzhugh owned 38 slaves in Fairfax County in 1810.

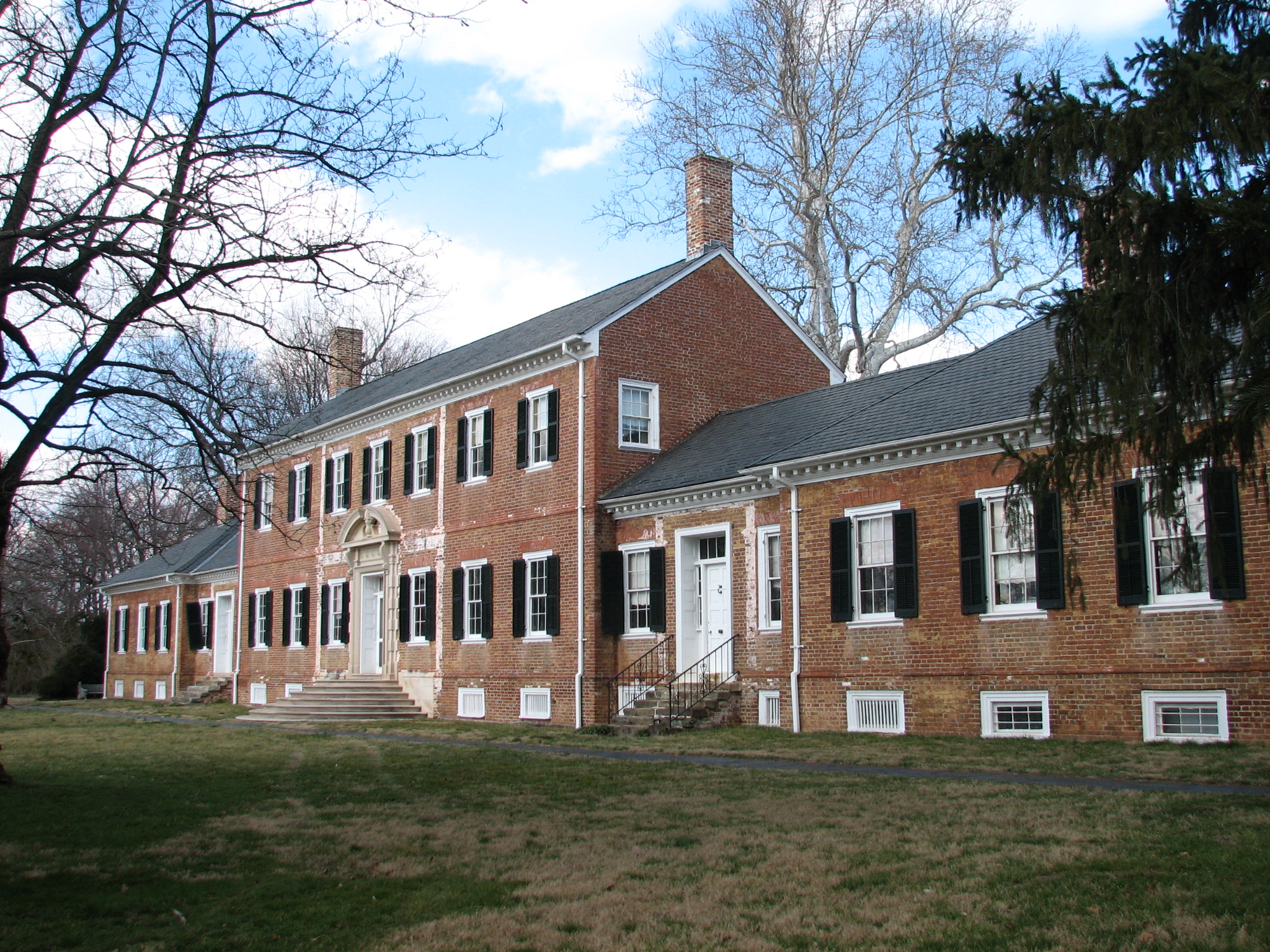
Chatham Manor, 120 Chatham Lane, Fredericksburg, originally built by William Fitzhugh, 1768–1771, restored, with changes, by Oliver H. Clark for Daniel Bradford Devore

Fitzhugh married Ann Bolling Randolph (1747–1805), daughter of Peter Randolph and wife Lucy Bolling and also descended from the First Families of Virginia. His wife's paternal grandparents were William Randolph II and Elizabeth Beverley. This Randolph connection made Ann Fitzhugh cousin to Thomas Jefferson, who visited their home in Fredericksburg. This William and Ann had daughters but only one son, William Henry Fitzhugh, who continued the family's planter and political traditions in the 19th century.

== Career ==
In addition to the political activities described below, Fitzhugh was a planter, farming large estates (in several counties in Virginia's Northern Neck and what has now become the northern Virginia suburbs of Washington, D.C.) using enslaved labor. He built Chatham Manor on property in Stafford County across the Rappahannock River from Fredericksburg, Virginia, and completed it in 1771 after three years of construction. The Fitzhughs lived a lavish life there that included experimental farming, and his special passions of horse breeding and racing. After the Revolutionary War, as the economy floundered, Fitzhugh sold Chatham Manor and 1,288 acres (5.21 km^{2}) to Churchill Jones for $20,000.

William Fitzhugh and George Washington visited each other frequently until Washington died in 1799. Washington mentioned Fitzhugh in his diary and they served together on the Pohick Church vestry. Fitzhugh was the last person that Washington visited outside of Mount Vernon before his death.

In the 1787 Virginia tax census, Fitzhugh or relatives of the same name owned 60 enslaved adults older than 16 as well as 91 children in King George County, 4 adult and 5 child slaves in Prince William County, 54 adult and 54 child slaves in Stafford County, 57 adult and 81 child slaves in Fairfax County, and 8 adults and 10 children in Westmoreland County. A man of the same name and possibly him or a relative owned 20 adult and 23 children in nearby Caroline County (south of Fredericksburg and Spotsylvania County).

After the new U.S. Congress decided to move the national capital to land donated by Virginia and Maryland along the Potomac River to become the new federal city (soon Washington, D.C.), Fitzhugh moved his main residence northward from near Fredericksburg to Alexandria, across from the new federal buildings (but part of the District of Columbia from 1790 until decades after Fitzhugh's death). His cousin Col. Henry Fitzhugh (1723–1783; son of Burgess Henry Fitzhugh who died in 1745) having died, Fitzhugh acquired much of his estate in Fairfax County (where North Springfield is now located) from his heirs. In 1796 William Fitzhugh built another mansion, that he called Ravensworth. That Fairfax County property became his country home, with the Fitzhughs spending winters at their townhouse in Alexandria. Ravensworth stood until about 1925, when it burned under mysterious circumstances.

About 1799, William Fitzhugh bought the house at 607 Oronoco Street, Alexandria, Virginia, which is now usually known as "The Boyhood Home of Robert E. Lee." The house had been built in 1795 by John Potts Jr. After William Fitzhugh's death, William Henry Fitzhugh inherited the property and rented it to the Lee family.

== Political career ==
Fitzhugh first served as a legislator when Virginia's General Assembly consisted solely of the House of Burgesses. He was one of two part-time representatives from King George County, and served alongside Joseph Jones between 1772 and 1775. When tensions with Britain escalated and Virginia colonial governor John Murray, 4th Earl of Dunmore, dissolved the Assembly, Fitzhugh and Jones continued to serve their County in all five ad hoc Virginia Revolutionary conventions (some held in Williamsburg and others in Richmond), as well as in the first sessions of the Virginia House of Delegates after creation of the new state government. Fitzhugh was also a member of the Revolutionary Committee of Safety in 1774–75. During the American Revolutionary War Fitzhugh was a commissioner of two arms and munitions factories. He represented Stafford County as a member of the Virginia House of Delegates beginning in 1777. Somewhat ironically, Fitzhugh served and then succeeded his distant cousin, Charles Carter, who had previously represented King George County in the House of Burgesses (as had his father of the same name, but who had been disinherited for his excessive spending, won a court case in order to acquire then resell that inherited property, and used the proceeds and loans from Speaker John Robinson in order to move from King George to Stafford County, which that Charles Carter represented before, during and after the American Revolutionary War while also incurring additional personal financial problems. Meanwhile, beginning in 1781 through 1785, voters in Westmoreland, Stafford, and King George Counties elected and re-elected Fitzhugh to the state Senate. Fitzhugh last represented Stafford County in the House of Delegates in 1787–1788. In 1797, Fitzhugh was a candidate in Virginia's 18th congressional district.

Fitzhugh also was a presidential elector for the 1789 election from Westmoreland District. That District consisted of King George County, Lancaster County, Northumberland County, Richmond County, Stafford County, and Westmoreland County, which cover the area between the Rappahannock and Potomac Rivers. All ten Virginia electors who voted each cast one of his two votes for George Washington. Although Fitzhugh's second vote is unknown, five Virginia electors also voted for John Adams, three for George Clinton, one for John Hancock, and one for John Jay. In a letter from James Madison to Thomas Jefferson on 29 March 1789, 'Mr W Fitzhugh of Chatham' is described as a Federalist.

In 1804 Fitzhugh's daughter Mary Lee Fitzhugh was married in the parlor of the Alexandria townhouse to George Washington Parke Custis, grandson of Martha Dandridge Custis Washington and adopted grandson of George Washington. In 1831 their daughter, Mary Anna Randolph Custis, married Robert E. Lee.

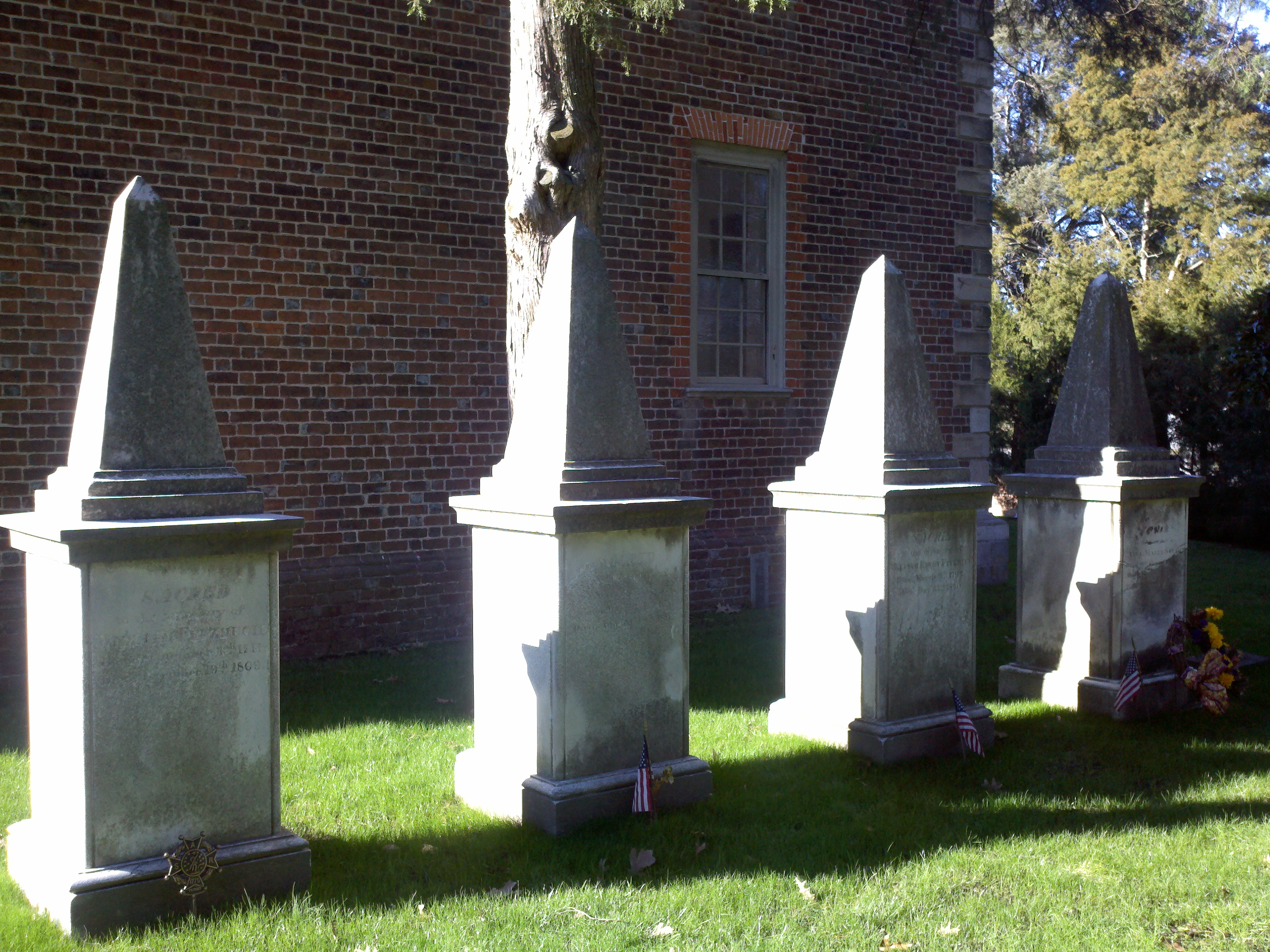
Fitzhugh graves at Pohick Church; William's is on the extreme left.

== Death and legacy ==
Fitzhugh died in 1809 at the age of 69, leaving behind the three of his children who survived to adulthood. He was initially buried at Ravensworth, which his son William Henry Fitzhugh inherited, but when the mansion was destroyed, his remains and gravestone were moved to historic Pohick Church cemetery in Lorton. He also gave the "Eagle's Nest" and "Somerset" plantations in King George County to his nephews William F. Grymes, Benjamin Grymes and Geeorge N. Grymes.
