= Beverly R. Wellford =

American physician

Beverly Randolph Wellford
- Born: July 29, 1797; Fredericksburg, Virginia
- Died: December 27, 1870 (aged 73); Richmond, Virginia
- Resting place: Hollywood Cemetery
- Occupation: Physician
- Spouse(s): Betty Burwell Page (1817–18); Mary Alexander (1824–1870)
- Children: John S. Wellford; Armistead N. Wellford; Beverly Randolph Wellford Jr.
- Parent(s): Robert Wellford; Catherine Yates

Beverly Randolph Wellford (July 29, 1797 – December 27, 1870) was an American medical doctor.

== Biography ==
Born in Fredericksburg, Virginia, he was the son of English physician Robert Wellford—a member of the Royal College of Surgeons, and his wife Catherine Yates. Beverly was educated in medicine by his father before attending lectures at the University of Maryland, where he was awarded his M. D. in the Spring of 1816. Following graduation, he returned home to practice medicine with his father.

== Personal life ==
He was a second cousin, once removed of President Thomas Jefferson.

In 1817 he was married to his first wife, Betty Burwell Page. She was his 3rd cousin, once removed. The couple had one daughter before Betty died in 1818.

1. Sarah Page Wellford (1818-1902); married Rev. Joseph M. Atkinson, had issue.

In 1824, he married his second wife, Mary Alexander, and the couple had six children, five of them boys.

1. Dr. John Spotswood Wellford (1825-1911)
2. Dr. Armistead Nelson Wellford (1826-1884); married Elizabeth Landon Carter, had issue, including R. Carter Wellford, a Virginia politician
3. Beverley Randolph Wellford Jr. (1828-1911); married Susan Seddon Taliaferro, had issue.
4. Roberta Catherine Wellford (1835-1853)
5. Charles Edward Wellford (1844-1912)
6. Mary Alexander Wellford (1845-1920); married James Markham Marshall (1838-1899), had issue. He was a great-nephew of Chief Justice John Marshall.

The Beverley Randolph Wellford name was used for multiple generations, with a third great-grandson born in 1957 being the sixth of the name (Armistead-Robert-John-Beverley V-Beverley VI).

== Professional career ==
In 1851, he was elected president of the Virginia Medical Association. During 1852-53, he served as sixth president of the American Medical Association. He was named professor of materia medica and therapeutics for the Medical College of Virginia in 1854; a chair he held until he retired in 1868 as professor emeritus. His elder son, John S. Wellford, succeeded his position at the College. Following a stroke that left him paralyzed, Beverly Wellford battled a protracted illness, before dying in Richmond, Virginia, on December 27, 1870.
