= Robert Carver =

Robert Carver may refer to:

- Robert Carver (composer) (c. 1485–c. 1570), Scottish Renaissance composer of Christian sacred music
- Robert Carver (painter) (1730–1791), Irish painter
- Bob Carver (fl. 1972–2013), audio electronics engineer

== See also ==
- Robert Carter (disambiguation)
