= Robert Wormeley Carter =

American politician (1734–1797)

Member of the Virginia House of Delegates for Richmond County, Virginia
- In office May 7, 1781 – May 4, 1783 Serving with William Smith, James Gordon Jr.
- Preceded by: William Peachy
- Succeeded by: John Fauntleroy
- In office May 3, 1779 – April 30, 1780 Serving with William Peachy
- Preceded by: William Smith
- Succeeded by: William Peachy

Member of the House of Burgesses for Richmond County, Colony of Virginia
- In office 1769–1775 Serving with Francis Lightfoot Lee
- Preceded by: Thomas Glasscock

Personal details
- Born: June 17, 1734 Sabine Hall, Richmond County, Colony of Virginia
- Died: 1797 (aged 62–63) Sabine Hall, Richmond County, Virginia
- Spouse: Winifred Travers Beale
- Children: Anne Beale Carter, Landon H. Carter Jr. (of Sabine Hall), Elizabeth Carter, George Carter, Frances Carter
- Parent(s): Landon Carter, Elizabeth Wormeley
- Relatives: Landon Carter (of Cleve) (cousin); Charles Carter (of Ludlow) (cousin)
- Occupation: planter, politician

Robert Wormeley Carter (June 17, 1734 – 1797) (sometimes nicknamed "Robin" by his father) was a Virginia planter and patriot who served in the House of Burgesses, all five Virginia Revolutionary Conventions, and briefly in the Virginia House of Delegates, all representing his native Richmond County.

== Early life ==
The son and principal heir of Landon Carter (who represented Richmond County part-time in the House of Burgesses for more than a decade and then became a leading advocate of independence before his death in 1778) and his first wife, the former Elizabeth Wormeley (1713-1740) was born at his father's seat, Sabine Hall, into the First Families of Virginia. His paternal grandfather Robert Carter was nicknamed "King Carter" in his lifetime because of his wealth and political influence, which include many years as Speaker of the House of Burgesses, followed by years on the Governor's Council (including two stints as the colony's acting governor). His maternal grandfather, John Wormeley, was likewise a planter from a long-powerful family, although he never served as a legislator, unlike his cousin and three generations of kin named "Ralph Wormeley". His birth family included two younger brothers, Landon Carter II (1738-1801) and John Carter (1739-1789) (both of whom became planters in Prince William County), and a sister, Elizabeth Wormeley Carter (1739-1778) who married Nelson Berkeley of Hanover County (1739-1787) (son of a burgess). His father remarried twice, both to young women who bore daughters shortly before their own deaths. Maria Byrd Carter bore Maria Carter (1744-1817, who married Robert Beverley of Essex County), and Elizabeth Beale Carter bore Judith Carter (1749-1836, who defied her father by marrying Reuben Beale of Madison County) and Lucy Carter, although her other daughters Fanny, Beale and Susannah (Sukie) Carter, all died young.

In 1756, Robert Wormeley Carter married Winifred Travers Beale (1733-1794), who bore several children who survived to adulthood. Their firstborn, Anne Beale Carter (1756-1809), married her cousin, Charles B. Carter. Robert Wormeley Carter's son and primary heir, Landon H. Carter, Jr. (of Sabine Hall) (1757-1820), would ultimately inherit Sabine Hall, but only served a single term in the House of Delegates. Another daughter, Elizabeth Carter (1759-1840), married her cousin Landon Carter (of Cleve) (1751-1811) who would briefly serve in the House of Delegates representing King George County. Landon Carter (of Cleve) was placed under the guardianship of his uncle, Robert Wormeley Carter's father, after his own father, Charles Carter (of Cleve) passed away. Another son, George Carter (d. 1802), married his cousin Sarah Champe. A third daughter, Frances W. ("Fanny") Carter (1760-1850) married Ludwell Lee, a Virginia lawyer, planter and multi-term legislator who lived in Alexandria then Loudoun County.

Robert Wormeley Carter should not be confused with his namesakes, a nephew by his brother John Fitzhugh Carter [Robert Wormeley Carter (1774-1809)] and a grandson by his son Landon H. Carter, Jr. [Robert Wormeley Carter (1792-1861)].

== Career ==
Robert Wormeley Carter was groomed to take control of his father's extensive plantations, which were in eight counties by the time of the old Colonel's death, and all operated using enslaved labor. Although his father remarried twice after Elizabeth Wormeley's death, the senior Landon Carter survived both young wives. Moreover, after the death of his third wife, the elder Carter chose not to marry again, and lived with his unmarried daughters, his son and his wife Winifred at Sabine Hall in what became an uneasy arrangement for Winifred and this man's growing family. Winifred Beale's father, Captain William Beale, was also a significant planter in Richmond County, and a relative, Billy Beale, worked as a gentleman apprentice of Col. Landon Carter (Owen Griffith being the other steward/manager). However, Colonel Carter came to detest Captain Beale, in part because he thought this son loved his father-in-law more than his own father, and because his sister Judith loved Winifred's brother Reuben Beale (whom Col. Carter thought sickly), and Capt. Beale harbored the exiled Judith (who married her beau in 1773). Col. Carter's use of physical discipline on his namesake grandson caused additional difficulties. This man's drinking, gambling, and other financial extravagances also troubled the colonel, who threatened to disinherit Robin if he left Sabine Hall. Furthermore, Moses, an enslaved man whom this man appropriated as his personal valet, became one of eight slaves who escaped Sabine Hall at the start of the American Revolutionary War, with Winifred Carter helping to coverup the escape to protect her maidservant Betty.

While in his lifetime Col. Landon Carter was known as one of the most popular published advocates of colonial rights, he is now known as a diarist, for many of his farming/experimental journals and some of his journals concerning his legislative service survive. This son likewise kept a diary, of which 17 years survive, of mostly operational notes made on pages of a Virginia newspaper. One of those notes indicates he bought interior cabinetry for his remodeling of Sabine Hall from famed local architect William Buckland (who also worked on George Mason's Gunston Hall and John Tayloe's Mt. Airy, as well as Francis Lightfoot Lee's now-nearly destroyed Menokin estate).

Robert Wormeley Carter began his political career in 1769, when he was 35 years old. Four years earlier, he joined in Richard Henry Lee's Westmoreland Association against the Stamp Tax, although his father (who corresponded with Lee) refused to sign, because Landon Carter still trusted the British monarch, and at that point would only foster the patriotic movement by meeting with a dissident Tappahannock merchant and urging him to comply to avoid a mobbing. Although sons of the local justices of the peace often began serving on the local court at an earlier age, his relatively late admission may have been related to his father's withdrawal from the local bench in 1762 and decision not to resume the bench in 1769, when this man began his service.

1769 also marked the first time that Richmond County voters elected Robert Wormeley Carter as one of their representatives in the House of Burgesses. Voters continued to re-elect him and neighbor (and fellow planter) Francis Lightfoot Lee, including after Lord Dunmore suppressed the Virginia General Assembly in 1775. During the American Revolutionary War, Richmond County voters elected both men as their representatives to all five Virginia Revolutionary Conventions. Although this man was not elected in May 1776 to the initial session of the Virginia House of Delegates, he did again represent Richmond County in that body two additional times, with a year of non-service in the same year that Francis Lightfoot Lee's election was disqualified. One historian notes that in 1775 members of a nearby parish (North Farnham) petitioned for dissolution of its vestry as overly related by marriage or consanguinity, which might have led to the election of the pair of men outside that kinship network in this county, although Francis Lightfoot Lee would soon begin service in the Continental Congress.

In the 1787 state tax census, Robert Wormeley Carter paid taxes on 80 enslaved laborers and 86 enslaved children in Richmond County (alone), as well as 26 horses, 180 other livestock and two post chaises, as well as for his son Landon, and probable overseers Griffin G. Berrick, Robert Reynolds and Henry Sisson. The commonness of the name Robert Carter makes confirmation of his slaveholdings in other counties difficult, especially since in Landon Carter's will, this Robert only inherited half of his father's slaves (which the inventories collectively enumerated as 401 people).

== Death and legacy ==
Robert Wormeley Carter died in 1797 and was buried at Sabine Hall, which his son Landon inherited, along with many slaves. Sabine Hall was listed on the National Register of Historic Places in 1969. Many of the family's papers are held by the University of Virginia library. Complicating matters, his grandson of the same name (1792-1861, son of his son Landon Carter, rather than his brother of the same name), but usually called Robert W. Carter would later serve multiple terms in both houses of the Virginia General Assembly. Another grandson John Armistead Carter (1808- 1890), a lawyer and Robert W. Carter's younger brother, would also serve in both houses of the Virginia General Assembly representing Loudoun County, Virginia, and voted against secession at the Virginia Secession Convention of 1861.
