= Edward Dale (burgess) =

American royalist and politician (died 1695)

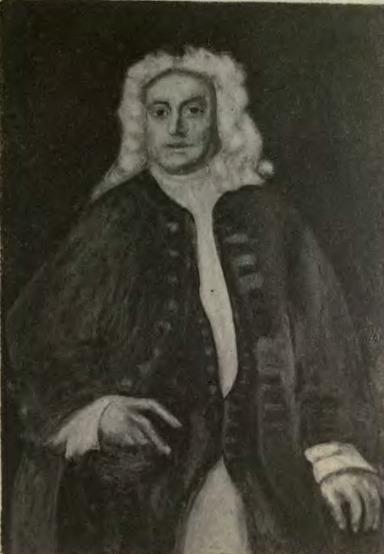

Member of the House of Burgesses for Lancaster County
- In office November 1682 – 1683 Serving with William Ball
- Preceded by: John Carter Jr.
- Succeeded by: David Fox
- In office 1676–1677 Serving with William Ball, David Fox
- Preceded by: John Carter Jr.
- Succeeded by: John Carter Jr.
- In office 1676–1676 Serving with Thomas Haynes
- Preceded by: Thomas Haynes
- Succeeded by: John Carter Jr.

Personal details
- Born: circa 1620 England
- Died: 2 Feb 1695 Virginia
- Spouse: Diana Skipwith Dale
- Occupation: government official and politician

Edward Dale (c. 1620 – 1695) was a Royalist who emigrated to Virginia, where he held various offices in Lancaster County, Virginia including as a member of the House of Burgesses.

== Early life ==
Dale was born in England. It is unclear whether he was related to early deputy governor Sir Thomas Dale, who returned to England before his death in 1619 and whose estate included lands in both Virginia and England.

== Career ==
Edward Dale emigrated from England to Virginia, as did fellow Royalist and his eventual brother-in-law, Grey Skipwith, 3rd Baronet of Prestwould. However, whereas Sir Grey Skipwith (then the second son of the 2nd Baronet) settled on the south side of the Rappahannock River in what became Middlesex County in the mid-1650s; Edward Dale settled on the river's north side in Lancaster County. Between 1655 and 1674, Dale served as the Lancaster County clerk, and was succeeded by John Stretchley, with Dale's son-in-law Thomas Carter becoming deputy clerk. Dale also served as one of the justices of the Lancaster County Court (which also administered the county in that era) from 1669 until 1684, as the county sheriff in 1670, 1671, 1679 and 1680, and became major of the county militia in 1680. During that period, in 1676 Bacon's Rebellion occurred, but Dale's only connection seems as Lancaster County's representative at a committee meeting to raise funds via levy to suppress the rebellion. Dale also served as the Lancaster County “Collector of Publique and County Levies”, and “Commissioner of the Fort”.

Last but not least, Dale served as one of the Burgesses representing Lancaster County on four occasions.

Dale was characterized as a "gentleman" or by his military title. He also may have operated plantations using enslaved labor, although he only was tithed for from two to four servants in various tax levys, because he several times purchased land in exchange for tobacco (then sometimes used as currency). His home plantation of about 600 acres was in St. Mary's White Chapel Parish. The earliest deeds with his name are dated May 6, 1663: one for 750 acres assigned by Richard Perrott and another for 500 acres from Richard Merryman, about a year after a deed for land on which Edward Dade resides was purchased from John and Margaret Paine. On February 2, 1664 Dale bought 250 acres from Edward Lunsford and on December 14, 1664 he bought another 700 acres from William Chappan. He deeded 500 acres to his daughter Katherine Carter in 1674 and 600 acres to his daughter Elizabeth Rogers in 1677. On February 1, 1668 he bought 500 acres from William Cappell and in May 1681 he bought 600 acres from Thomas Chetwood.

== Family ==
Coat of Arms of Edward Dale

Dale married Diana Skipwith, the sister of Sir Grey Skipwith as shown by surviving correspondence; it is unclear where they married. They had at least three daughters Katherine, Mary and Elizabeth; two of which lived to adulthood. Katherine Dale married Thomas Carter and Elizabth Dale married Mr. Rogers. Diana Skipwith is known to have used her maiden name after the birth of her first child. This was not uncommon in this time period due to the fact that her family was of ancient, noble origins and; thus, had a much higher social standing than that of Major Dale.

Dale's favored eldest daughter, Katherine Dale (later Katherine Carter) memorialized Diana by naming Diana Carter after her grandmother. Upon her marriage, Dale deeded Katherine Dale, and his new son-in-law, Thomas Carter, land that included Barford, (later renamed Verville, which is now on the National Register for Historic Places.

== Death and legacy ==
Dale died in Lancaster County, Virginia in the mid-1690s, and his wife died within months according to a family bible. His will filed in the Lancaster County Court bequeathed two named negro boys to his two youngest grandsons. A historical marker has been erected near Verville which mentions his descendants in the Carter, Harrison and Rogers families."

The Folger now has a copy of Shakespeare’s Second Folio (1632) listed in the inventory of Dale's estate; this is now the earliest record of Shakespeare’s works owned in America.
