= John Carter Jr. =

Virginia colonial politician (1650–1690)

Member of the House of Burgesses for Lancaster County
- In office 1676–1676 Serving with Thomas Haynes
- Preceded by: Edward Dale
- Succeeded by: Edward Dale

Personal details
- Born: circa 1650 Coromatan Plantation, England
- Died: 1690 Colony of Virginia
- Spouse: Elizabeth Travers
- Children: Elizabeth
- Parent: John Carter, Sr.,
- Occupation: Merchant, planter, politician

John Carter (circa 1650–1690) was a Virginia planter who served in the Virginia House of Burgesses, but whose political career was overshadowed by those of his father John Carter Sr. and his brother Robert Carter (often nicknamed "King Carter" for his wealth and social and political prominence in the Colony of Virginia).

== Early and family life ==
Carter was born to Jane Glyn of Middlesex, England, who emigrated to Virginia with her merchant husband John Carter. He had an elder brother George (who died at age 16 in 1654), and a slightly older sister Elizabeth, who would marry prominent Maryland colonists. Their family had initially settled in Upper Norfolk County (which became Nansemond County, Virginia), where all the children were born. In 1652, their father moved the family north of the Rappahannock River, to a plantation he called Corotoman, where their mother would die the following year. John and George were sent to England for their education, perhaps beginning when they were seven years old, as was the custom at the time. They boarded with their father's tobacco agent, who acted as surrogate parents as well as taught them the trade and were paid for their service.

Carter's father remarried four times (though his second and third wives died without bearing children), and had another daughter who died in infancy, as well as two additional sons: Robert by Sarah Ludlow and Charles Carter (1669 – died circa or after 1690) by Elizabeth Shirley, his fifth wife and widow (who sailed to England with Charles shortly after the funeral, as contemplated in John Sr's will). As the eldest surviving son, John raised his younger half-siblings. He sent his half-brother Robert (who was only six when their father died) to England to be educated for six years, during which the boy lived with a tobacco merchant named Mr. Bailey and likely also learned about that trade as well. His sisters and half-sisters married within the First Families of Virginia.

In 1675, the 30-year-old Carter married Elizabeth Hull (who died between 1680 and 1684). They had a daughter, also Elizabeth, two years later, who was 14 years old when her father died and in time married John Lloyd. The widower remarried in 1684 to Elizabeth Travers, the daughter of Col. Rawleigh Travers.

== Career ==
When his father died, Carter inherited Coromotan, the family's main plantation, as the first son. One of his father's executors, David Miles (possibly distantly related in England), also assisted this John Carter and his brother until Miles died in 1674 (and was buried in the chancel of the church, as had the elder John Carter). Like his father, Carter farmed mostly using indentured labor, but some enslaved labor as well, as enumerated in the elder Carter's will. John Carter also increased his landholdings though marriage, marrying Elizabeth Travers, daughter of Col. Rawleigh Travers, also of Lancaster County.

Before his father's death, Carter assisted him at Corotoman plantation and with his public duties. He was a justice of the peace for Lancaster County (in an era where the justices jointly administered the county) and served for 22 years, nearly until his death. The governor also appointed him the county's High Sheriff, and at some point his title changed from Captain to Colonel. In response to Bacon's Rebellion, Col. John Carter II called out the Lancaster County militia in support of Governor William Berkeley, and after Bacon's death by disease, began hearing court cases involving goods impressed to support the militia, as well as tried to recover muskets, sword belts and bandoliers from former militia members. Carter and his colleagues also heard many cases involving runaway servants, poached livestock and Carter acted as executor and inventorier of wills of those who died. Carter began serving in the House of Burgesses in 1676, the year of Bacon's Rebellion, which changed the colony's relationship with the Board of Trade in London. He also had a substantial library of several hundred volumes.

== Death and legacy ==
Carter died in 1690, possibly of malaria contracted three years earlier, and which had necessitated his replacement as justice of the peace at that time. Some of his estate and slaves went to his widow, who in June, 1691 took her third husband. She became the fourth wife of Col. Christopher Wormeley, also on the Governor's Council. According to various provisions, their 14-year old daughter Elizabeth received money (some entrusted to his London merchants), land and ten Negroes (which she would inherit at age 18) and the "negro Childe Bridget to waite upon her". John Carter's will also provided that his brother Robert Carter would receive the mill and other real estate if John's daughter Elizabeth did not have children—and in fact she died of measles in November 1693, shortly after her marriage to the son of Richmond County burgess (and Col.) William Lloyd, and that estate became subject to litigation because of her deathbed will naming her husband John Lloyd as her executor. John Carter's will also provided that his brother Charles (then in England) would only receive 3 pounds sterling (as did Robert) to buy a mourning ring. Even this, however, produced litigation, as several unpaid creditors sued. The court early on found some collusion and sales had taken place between the overseers, but dismissed charges against the immediate family. Moreover, after the widow's remarriage, her husband, Wormeley, sued on her behalf for her dower rights (which one descendant considered a formality), but lost after she died in 1693. Then John Lloyd became one of the administrators of his late father-in-law's estate to replace his wife, but decided to leave the colony for England in 1700, leaving his burgess brother Thomas in charge of his Virginia plantations. Thirty years later the Court of Chancery in England ordered them sold to pay the debts of Lloyd's estate, and Robert Carter purchased them.

The second provision of Carter's will freed four slaves—Richard and his wife Chriss and their two daughters—and gave them a piece of land, cattle, barrels of corn and peas, and lumber to build a cabin. Richard (sometimes referred to as "Free Dick" or "Black Dick" or "Free Richard") married Elizabeth after Chriss' death and had a second son. He last appeared on the tithables list in 1706, and probably died soon thereafter. Many generations later, his descendant, Armistead Nickens became the first Black representative for Lancaster County in the Virginia House of Delegates.
