= Henry Fitzhugh (burgess) =

Member of the House of Burgesses from Stafford County
- In office 1736–1742 Serving with John Peyton
- Preceded by: John Fitzhugh
- Succeeded by: James Waugh

Personal details
- Born: January 15, 1706 "Eagle's Nest", Stafford County, Virginia, British America
- Died: December 16, 1742 (aged 36) "Eagle's Nest", King George County, Virginia, British America
- Spouse: Lucy Carter
- Education: Christ Church, Oxford University

Henry Fitzhugh (January 15, 1706 – December 6, 1742) was an American planter and soldier who served two terms in the House of Burgesses representing then-vast Stafford County and was an unsuccessful candidate for Speaker.

== Early and family life ==
Coat of arms of William Fitzhugh

The only son of William Fitzhugh of "Eagles' Nest" was born in what was then Stafford County (but became King George County, Virginia) and was a member of the First Families of Virginia. His grandfather, William Fitzhugh had acquired large estates in Virginia, operated them using indentured and enslaved labor, then divided them among his five sons. Young Henry was sent to England to be educated at Christ Church, Oxford University.

After returning to the Virginia colony, this Henry Fitzhugh married Lucy Carter (1715-1763), daughter of "King Carter" of Corotoman plantation and the largest landowner in Virginia of his day, and second wife Elizabeth "Betty" Landon. Henry and Lucy Fitzhugh were the parents of William Fitzhugh and other children.

== Career ==
Like other members of his family, Henry Fitzhugh operated large plantations acquired by his father and by using indentured and enslaved labor. When Stafford County reorganized and King George County, Virginia was created, most would be in King George County, Virginia.

Stafford County voters elected Fitzhugh as one of their representatives in the House of Burgesses in 1736, and he won re-election in 1742, although he died during that legislative term. He succeeded his cousin Major John Fitzhugh, who died in 1733, and served alongside fellow planter John Peyton. Planter John Hedgman succeeded to the seat following Fitzhugh's death. Henry Fitzhugh also served as lieutenant colonel of the Stafford County militia and unsuccessfully campaigned to become speaker of the House of Burgesses.
