= John Carter Sr. =

English merchant (1613–1670)

Member of the House of Burgesses for Upper Norfolk County
- In office 1642–1643 Serving with Daniel Coogan, Thomas Dewe, William Parker, Randall Crew
- Preceded by: Randall Crew
- Succeeded by: Randall Crew

Member of the House of Burgesses for Nansemond County
- In office 1649–1650 Serving with Toby Smith
- Preceded by: Moore Fauntleroy
- Succeeded by: Thomas Due

Member of the House of Burgesses for Lancaster County
- In office 1654–1655 Serving with James Bagnall
- Preceded by: John Baldwin
- Succeeded by: Henry Chicheley
- In office 1658–1660 Serving with Peter Montague, Henry Corbin, John Curtis
- Preceded by: Henry Chicheley
- Succeeded by: William Ball Sr.

Personal details
- Born: 1613 Middlesex, England
- Died: 1670 (aged 56–57) Colony of Virginia
- Spouse(s): Jane Glynn, Eleanor Brocas, Anne Carter, Sarah Ludlow, Elizabeth Sherley
- Children: John Carter, Robert Carter I
- Occupation: Merchant, planter, politician

John Carter (1613–January 10, 1670) was an English merchant who emigrated to the Virginia colony, where he speculated in land, established plantations using indentured and enslaved labor, and served in both houses of the Virginia General Assembly. He founded the more famous branch of the Carter family of Virginia. The immigrant ancestor of the other branch, Thomas Carter of Barford plantation (d. 1700) may have been related since both came from the same English village, and while Thomas Carter initially settled in Northumberland County, both men eventually settled in Lancaster County.

== Early life and emigration ==
Born probably in 1613 to Bridget Benion Carter, the second wife of the London merchant and vintner John Carter, he was christened on December 18, 1614 at Christ Church Parish of Newgate Street in London, near St. Paul's cathedral. He (and his 2-year-older brother, Thomas, and other brother, William), had kinship ties to members of the Virginia Company of London, which financed the first expeditions to Virginia, but whose charter was revoked in 1624. Although some histories portray Carter as an unhappy supporter of King Charles I who fled England after that royal execution, one biographer speculates Carter may have been learning the tobacco trade, and may have been a relation of Edward Carter (d. 1682) who served with him in the House of Burgesses as well as the Virginia Governor's Council.

== Career ==
John Carter, age 22, sailed to the Virginia Colony from England in 1635 aboard the ship Safety with his elder brother Thomas, but returned to England the same year to court Jane Glyn (whose father owned land in Middlesex, England and Llanidloes and Montgomeryshire in Wales), and also made a business arrangement with his maternal uncle Gabriel Benion (whose son Daniel was in the Virginia colony) and his partner Richard Glover. Carter tried to return to Virginia the next year, but the Spanish plate fleet captured the ship Elizabeth and took it and its passengers to Cadiz. In 1638, Carter managed to return to London, where he testified in the High Court of Admiralty about the value of the goods he was taking to Virginia (which were lost; and records of the claim's payment are likewise lost), and married Jane Glyn. By 1640 John Carter and his wife had returned to the Virginia colony as emigrants, and soon settled in Upper Norfolk County (which is now Nansemond County).

In August 1642 Carter bought 1300 acres on Cossotomen Creak (which became Carters Creek) north of the Rappahannock River in what became Lancaster County from Daniel Gookin, a burgess and Puritan who was preparing to leave Virginia for Maryland and eventually Massachusetts. That land grant would become the core of Carter's Corotoman plantation. In December 1643 Carter patented 300 acres in Nansemond County for transporting six indentured servants to the colony. However, the Powhatan Confederacy under Opecancanough rose up against white settlers in 1644, killing many as well as destroying farms and livestock. Major John Carter led the Lancaster County militia on a retaliatory expedition against the Rappahannock tribe the next year, which led Governor William Berkeley to make a treaty restricting White settlers to lands south of the York River, although Carter's land was considerably north. By 1649 Governor Berkeley withdrew from that provision and again allowed settlements north of the York and even Rappahannock River, which eventually led to the French and Indian War. Meanwhile, in 1663 Carter acquired another 2,160 acres in Lancaster County. In October 1665, Carter received his largest land grant, for 4,000 acres because Captain Samuel Mathews (the Cromwellian governor) had died and abandoned his claim, as well as based on Carter's paying for eighty people to emigrate to Virginia, including 21 of African origin or descent. Carter settled on the Corotoman land by 1652, farmed it using indentured and enslaved labor, and made it his home.

Carter served many terms in the House of Burgesses: representing Upper Norfolk County beginning in 1642 and Lancaster County beginning in 1652, as well as held local offices.

By 1652, Carter was colonel of the Lancaster County militia. The following year Carter was one of the Justices of the Peace for neighboring Northumberland County, together with Richard Lee and Toby Fleet, and the General Assembly also named Carter Commander-in-Chief of the militias of Northumberland, Lancaster and Rappahannock Counties—all of which continued to face native American raids. In 1654 Carter was among Lancaster County's 117 enumerated households and paid taxes on 33 tithables (indentured and enslaved workers); in 1663 the number of his tithables had increased to 45, but a year later the county was physically reduced to the land which became present day Lancaster and Middlesex Counties. By his death, Carter had 58 tithables. In 1655 Carter also became the tax collector for all major ships entering the Rappahannock River, for which he was paid 4% of the tax levied. In 1655/56, Carter also built the lower courthouse for the county, but ran overbudget. A decade later, when Carter was warden of Christ Church, he began construction of a church, which would be completed a year after his death, but later superseded by the historic church which remains today.

On March 13, 1658, fellow Burgesses elected Carter to the Governor's Council, generally a lifetime appointment, but Carter was a Royalist during this era of the English Civil War, so the Burgesses postponed his re-election on March 19, 1659 until the following year, during which interval news reached Virginia concerning Oliver Cromwell's death and his succession as Lord Protector by his son Richard Cromwell. Carter objected so strenuously that the Cromwellian Governor, Samuel Mathews, issued an arrest warrant for him. When King Charles II was restored to his throne the following year, he confirmed the reappointment of William Berkeley as Virginia's Governor, and Berkeley and Carter also received reparations for their tobacco and trade losses under the Cromwellian regime. Carter won reappointment to the Governor's Council and probably served the rest of his life, although many of those records were lost or destroyed.

== Personal life ==
Carter married five times. He married his first wife, Jane Glynn, in England, and she bore two sons (George and John Jr.) and a daughter (Elizabeth) before she died. While George died at age 18 (before reaching legal adulthood), John Carter Jr. (d. 1690) would also serve in the Virginia House of Burgesses. Their daughter Elizabeth married Nathaniel Utie, a member of the Maryland Governor's Council, and after his death Captain Henry Johnson (also of Maryland). In 1655, Carter married Eleanor Eltonhead Brocas, the widow of Capt. William Brocas (who had also served on the Governor's Council, Carter billed the estate for his services as an appraiser), although no children are known of that marriage, nor of Carter's next marriage, the following year in England, to Anne Carter, daughter of Cleve Carter (she died less than 2 years later, before 1662). Carter's fourth wife was Sarah Ludlow, from Wiltshire, daughter of Gabriel Ludlow and wife Phyllis Will, who bore a daughter (Sarah, who died as an infant) and son (Robert Carter I (1664-1672)). Robert would become known as "King Carter" for his wealth and prominence in Virginia society and politics. On October 24, 1668, Carter signed a marriage contract with Elizabeth Sherley, who survived him. However, as contemplated in his will, she returned to England with their son Charles (b. 1669), who probably died shortly before reaching legal age in 1690.

== Death and legacy ==
Carter died on January 10, 1670 (affected by subsequent calendar changes), survived by his widow, three sons and a daughter. He was buried with four of his wives in Lancaster County in the chancel of the church he helped build, Christ Church, a rebuilt version of which is listed on the National Register of Historic Places. Carter owned about 2600 acres in Lancaster County at his death. An inventory of his estate listed contracts for 34 named indentured servants, as well as 42 enslaved Africans or people of African descent (with only first names and no ending date listed for their labor). His will and codicil (executed a week before his death) were not recorded until January 9, 1722, by his son Robert Carter.
