= Charles Carter (of Ludlow) =

American planter and politician (1732–1796)

Member of the Virginia Senate for King George, Stafford and Westmoreland County
- In office November 28, 1789 – December 4, 1789
- Preceded by: Thomas Lee
- Succeeded by: Alexander Campbell

Member of the Virginia House of Delegates for Stafford County
- In office May 1782 – May 2, 1784 Serving with John Francis Mercer, Thomson Mason
- Preceded by: Thomas Mountjoy
- Succeeded by: Bailey Washington Jr.
- In office 1776–1779 Serving with William Brent, William Fitzhugh
- Preceded by: position established
- Succeeded by: Bailey Washington

Member of the House of Burgesses for Stafford County
- In office 1773–1776 Serving with John Alexander, Thomas Ludwell Lee
- Preceded by: Yelverton Peyton
- Succeeded by: position ended

Member of the House of Burgesses for King George County
- In office 1771–1756 Serving with Charles Carter, William Champe, William Robinson,
- Preceded by: Thomas Turner
- Succeeded by: Joseph Jones

Personal details
- Born: October 15, 1732 Middlesex County, Colony of Virginia
- Died: April 29, 1796 (aged 63) Fredericksburg, Virginia
- Spouse: Elizabeth Chiswell
- Children: 5 sons, 2 daughters
- Parent(s): Charles Carter, Mary Walker Carter
- Relatives: John Carter (Virginia colonial secretary), Landon Carter (uncles)
- Occupation: planter, politician

Charles Carter (October 15, 1732 – April 29, 1796) was a Virginia planter, patriot, and politician. He was sometimes nicknamed "Blaze" for his red face or reckless behavior, or "Nanzatico" or "Ludlow" for plantation houses he erected but was later forced to sell. He held several local offices in King George County and later in Stafford County, both of which he represented at various times in the Virginia House of Burgesses before the American Revolutionary War. This Charles Carter also represented Stafford County in four of Virginia's Revolutionary Conventions and during the conflict operated saltpeter factories and the important Chiswell lead mines in what became distant Wythe County, then won election to both houses of the Virginia General Assembly, although he may only have been seated (multiple times) as one of Stafford County's representatives in the Virginia House of Delegates before taking a seat on the Governor's Advisory Council shortly after his election to the Virginia senate.

== Early life ==
The eldest son of prominent planter and burgess Charles Carter was born on October 15, 1732. The exact location of his birth is unknown, because his father owned several plantations in different counties of the region now known as Virginia's Northern Neck, and Cleve plantation (for which his father was known and resided for many years) was only built in 1754 (presumably after this boy's education in England was finished). This firstborn Charles Carter was baptized on November 15, 1732 at Christ Church in Lancaster County, Virginia. His mother, Mary Walker, was the daughter of Joseph Walker of York County, and died when this boy was ten years old, and also after having given birth to three daughters (his full sisters).

His father remarried, to Anne Byrd, the then 17-year old daughter of burgess William Byrd II (1674-1744), so this man gained two half-brothers and six half-sisters from that relationship, and another half sister from his father's third wife and widow, Lucy Taliaferro (daughter of Capt. William Taliaferro was at most seventeen years old at the time of her marriage in 1763, younger than her stepson). His paternal grandfather Robert Carter I was known as "King Carter" even during his lifetime for his political influence and great wealth based on landholdings and enslaved labor.

In King Carter's time, his family's parish church was in Middlesex County, Virginia and still is sometimes known as "King Carter's Church". This Charles Carter was closely related to the First Families of Virginia through his own ancestry and that of his stepmothers. His uncle John Carter (Virginia colonial secretary) was also on the governor's council, as was another uncle Robert Carter III and yet a third uncle Landon Carter was also like their father a planter and member of the House of Burgesses (and now also known as a writer).

This Charles Carter married Elizabeth Chiswell, daughter of burgess John Chiswell, a major real estate speculator and mine owner whose possible suicide on the eve of his trial for murdering a merchant produced a great scandal long before the Revolutionary War. The couple had five sons and two daughters. Although their son Charles Carter died as an infant, sons who reached adulthood included John Champe Carter (1775-1809), George Washington Carter (1777-1809), and Walker Randolph Carter (b. 1772, died after 1813).

== Career ==
Carter operated plantations using overseers and enslaved labor, first in King George County. As a young man, this Charles Carter became known for his profligate spending, so that in 1762 his father bequeathed his main plantation, Cleve in King George County, to his younger half brother, and required this man to acknowledge that he had received ample provision in land and slaves from his father and that his father had paid some of his large debts. Nonetheless, when his father died two years later, this Charles Carter successfully contested that will and caused the Virginia General Assembly to break the entail on several properties, which he then sold, as well as borrowed money from his wife's brother in law Speaker John Robinson to buy "Nanzatico", a 2,200 acre plantation also in King George County, on which be built a spacious new house, only to (according to tradition) tear it down and erect another. After Speaker Robinson died, this Carter became involved in the scandal involving Robinson's loans using paper money scheduled to be destroyed, and lost a court judgment to the estate's executor. He sold Nanzitico to his cousin, Charles Hill Carter, and moved his family to Ludlow, a plantation he owned in Staiford County where he also built a house.

Carter initially represented King George County in the House of Burgesses for fifteen years, at first alongside his father, the county's largest landowner. After moving to Stafford County, as he had in King George County, Carter served as a justice of the peace (the justices jointly also responsible for the county's administration). Carter also represented Stafford County in the House of Burgesses, but took that seat either on an interim basis in 1773 or in May 1774, but Virginia's last colonial governor first nullified one election in the county, then suppressed the entire body about a year later. Stafford County voters then elected this Charles Carter to four of the five Virginia Revolutionary Conventions, and after the 4th Convention, he left to produce saltpeter at several locations in northern and southwestern Virginia. Carter did not stand for election for the last convention, as he was occupied running the important Chiswell lead mines in what later became Wythe County. Stafford County voters then elected him as one of their first two representatives in the Virginia House of Delegates, and continued to re-elect him until he resigned in order to become the Stafford County sheriff. Carter again won election to the Virginia House of Delegates (still a part time position) in 1782, and again won re-election. Carter favored adoption of the federal constitution, but did not win election to the Virginia Ratification Convention in 1788; instead local voters elected George Mason, whose family had long held property and represented Stafford County, but who lived in Fairfax County and was a leading (though unsuccessful) opponent of ratification. Carter's last major election victory was for the Virginia state senate seat in 1789, representing King George, Stafford and Westmoreland Counties, but he may not have actually been seated in Richmond, for a new election was called weeks later. However, such may also have been called because fellow delegates elected Carter to the Council of State (the executive branch of the state government, at the time dominated by the state legislature), for which service he received a salary and served uneventfully for fourteen months.

After selling his last plantation, Ludlow, in 1788 to satisfy creditors' demands, Carter lived in Fredericksburg, and his wife advertised for boarders from a nearby academy. In the 1790s, this Charles Carter corresponded several times with President George Washington, appealing for assistance for his sons, one of whom he had bound as an apprentice to a Philadelphia coachmaker and two others to planters. His fourth son studied medicine in Philadelphia. His cousin Charles Hill Carter also allowed this man's wife to retain the earnings of several slaves which this man had sold to him, which kept this family out of poverty during their final years.

== Death and legacy ==
Charles Carter died in Fredericksburg on April 29, 1796, and was buried in the Willis family cemetery, one of his brothers having married a Willis. One of his grandsons, John C. Carter (son of Walker Randolph Carter), became a U.S. Naval officer from Kentucky, served during the Mexican American War and the American Civil War, and died in Brooklyn.
