= Robert Carter (ballet dancer) =

American ballet dancer

- Born: Charleston, South Carolina
- Occupation: Ballet dancer

Robert Carter is an American primo donna (Note: Also known as a ballerina assoluta, see Finis Jhung, "Interview with Robert Carter", q.v.) ballet dancer for Les Ballets Trockadero de Monte Carlo, or "Trocks". As a lead dancer and its most senior member, Carter is the public face of the all-male dance troupe, granting many interviews and garnering significant international reviews. A full time dancer, he is "paid enough" as a lead dancer, despite being non-union, to avoid having a "side job."

== Personas ==
Carter has performed female roles under the name of "Olga Supphozova" (Note: "Olga, supper is over.") a "glamorous" and "feisty platinum blonde" who is, in his own words, "fastidiously delicate and pretty." He also performs under the male persona known as Yuri Smirnov. As Olga, he claims to have started in a KGB lineup, and as Yuri, he supposedly was in the Kirov Ballet. These personas use "cod-Russian stage names," according to one British critic. The names used by the "Trocks" are "fake ballerina names" that are part of the joke.

== Career ==
Carter was born and was raised in Charleston, South Carolina. He started dancing at age eight, and first saw the Trocks at age ten, which inspired him to dance like them, en pointe, at age eleven or twelve. He trained at the Ivey Ballet School and the Joffrey Ballet School. He performed with a number of dance groups, including the Florence Civic Ballet, Bay Ballet Theater, and the Dance Theater of Harlem.

Carter joined the "Trocks" in 1995. He started with "the easier stuff" like Go for Barocco, followed by "harder stuff" such as Paquita and Swan Lake, especially works by Balanchine.

Dancing with the Trocks, was his life dream, says Carter:

I didn't want to be a girl, but I knew I could do a lot of the same stuff and some of the stuff they couldn't do because I had the strength being a boy.... I could do the stuff en pointe and it's fun.

— Robert Carter, in an ABC News Nightline interview, 2008.

== Accolades and criticism ==
Carter has received many kudos from significant critics. These include Jennifer Dunning and Gia Kourlas of The New York Times, Robert Gottlieb of The New York Observer, Joan Acocella of The New Yorker, Sanjoy Roy of The Guardian, and Susan Reiter of Newsday. ABC News said, "And it's more than just hilarious -- it's hilariously impressive."
