= Landon Carter =

American planter and politician (1710–1778)

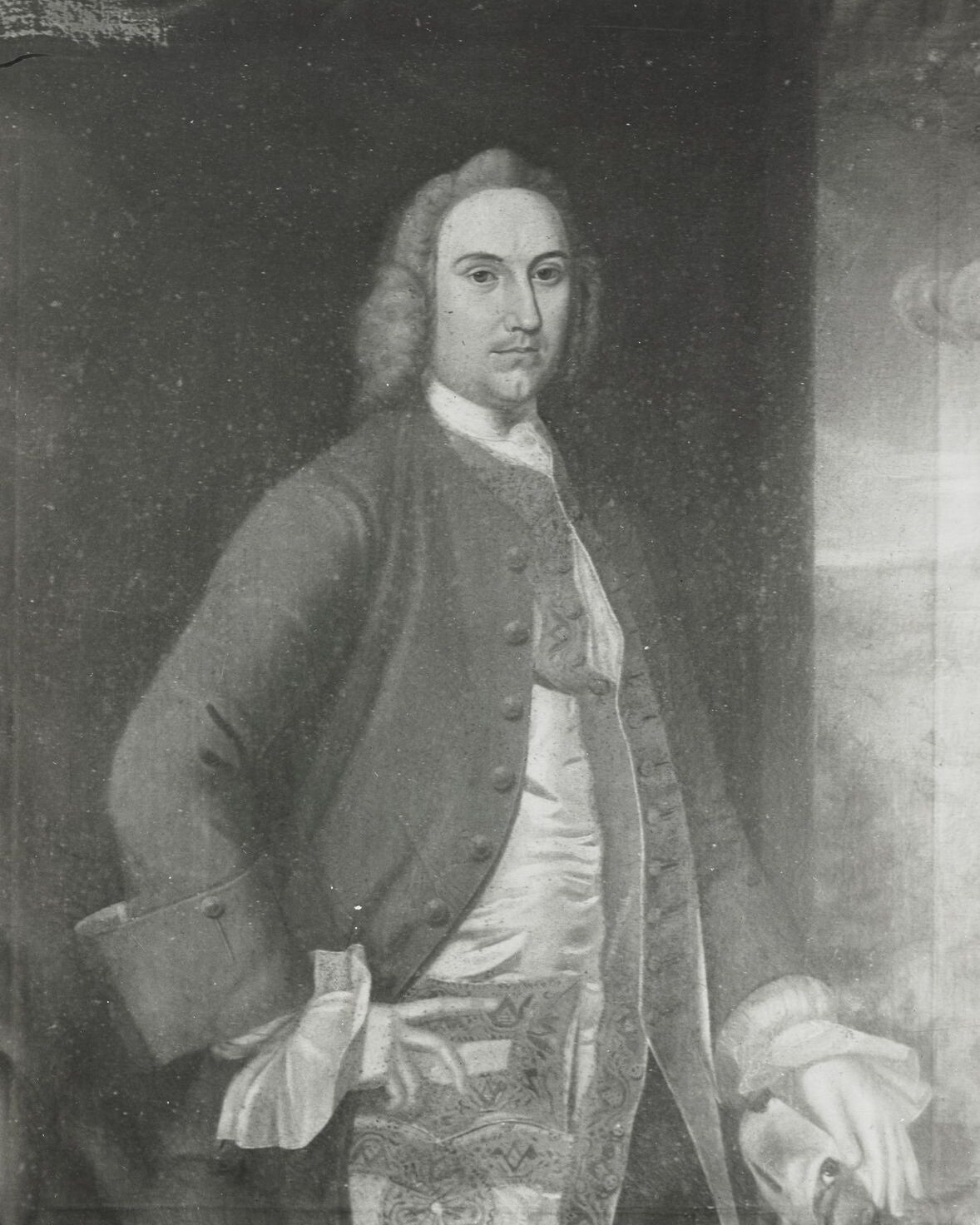
- Portrait by Charles Bridges

Member of the House of Burgesses for Richmond County, Colony of Virginia
- In office 1752–1768 Serving with John Woodbridge
- Preceded by: William Fauntleroy
- Succeeded by: Thomas Glasscock

Personal details
- Born: August 18, 1710 Lancaster County, Virginia
- Died: December 22, 1778 (aged 68) Virginia
- Children: Robert Wormeley Carter and several daughters
- Parent(s): Robert Carter I, Elizabeth Landon Willis
- Relatives: Charles, Robert Carter II of Nomini, George Carter (brothers); John Carter (half-brother)
- Education: in England
- Occupation: planter, politician

Colonel Landon Carter (August 18, 1710 – December 22, 1778) was an American planter and politician from Lancaster County, Virginia. Although one of the most popular patriotic writers and pamphleters of pre-Revolutionary and Revolutionary-era Virginia, he may today be perhaps best known for his journal, which described colonial life leading up the American War of Independence, The Diary of Colonel Landon Carter.

== Early life and schooling ==
Landon Carter was the son of Robert Carter (a Virginia-born merchant planter, so rich and politically powerful that contemporaries nicknamed him "King" Carter) and his second wife, Elizabeth Landon Willis. His mother died in 1719 when he was young. His elder half-brother, John Carter, became guardian of his under-age half siblings. In 1719, Landon Carter, age nine, was sent to England to be schooled under the early linguist, Solomon Lowe. Although he proved a good student and received four more years of education than his brother Charles Carter of Cleve, Landon returned to Virginia in 1727, where he continued his education at the College of William and Mary, then assisted his father operating various plantations and other businesses.

== Family connections and personal life ==
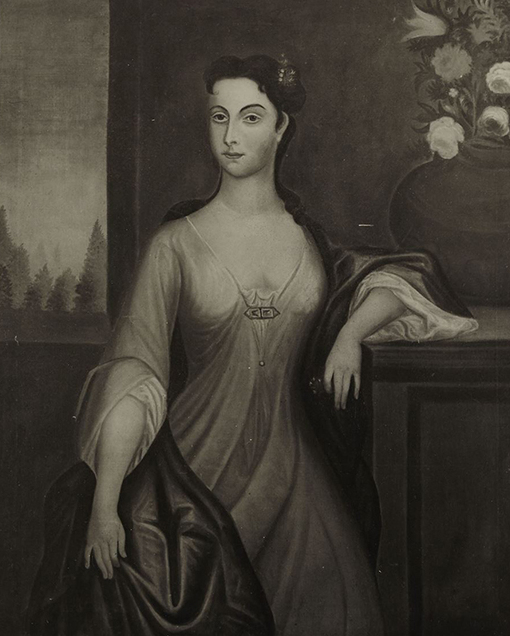
Portrait of Landon's wife, Maria Byrd Carter

"King" Carter died in 1732, and upon reaching legal age, Landon inherited a portion of his father's estate. He would marry three times, each time within the First Families of Virginia. He survived all three wives and increased his landholdings (which he farmed using enslaved labor) and siring several children. Shortly after reaching legal age, Carter married his first wife, Elizabeth Wormeley, daughter of burgess Ralph Wormeley. She died in 1740, but gave birth to Robert Wormeley Carter, who had at times a rocky relationship with his father, but ultimately followed a similar career path. In 1742, Landon married Maria Byrd, the 15-year-old daughter of William Byrd II, who died two years later. Carter married his third wife, Elizabeth Beale, in 1746, and decided not to remarry again after her death.

Like his father, Carter arranged favorable marriages for his progeny among the First Families of Virginia. Carter's daughter Maria, married Robert Beverley, son of Colonel William Beverley and Elizabeth Bland. He was named after his paternal grandfather.

== Career ==
Shortly after his first marriage, Carter settled on lands he had inherited in Richmond County. He owned properties in eight Virginia counties. In his diary he drew a distinction between his practices as a planter (producing tobacco) and as a farmer (with other crops and more scientific investigation). Beginning in 1734, Carter built a mansion, Sabine Hall, which from which he managed his Richmond county plantations. stood at the heart of his plantation there.

Like his father, Carter was active in local affairs, and ultimately became probably the most politically successful of all his siblings, although his slightly older brother Charles Carter of Cleve would serve more terms in the House of Burgesses. Following two unsuccessful attempts to become one of Richmond County's two (part-time) representatives in the House of Burgesses, Carter succeeded in 1752, then kept winning re-election from 1752 until defeated in 1768.

In 1764, his brother Charles Carter of Cleve, who represented King George County (where he too ran plantations, and produced wine as well as tobacco), had died. Landon helped raise his then under-aged nephews. Following the death of his third wife and increased British taxation after French and Indian War, Carter became a prolific pamphleteer. He also continued to correspond with men interested in scientific agriculture throughout the colonies. In 1769 he was elected a member of the American Philosophical Society in Philadelphia.

== Death and legacy ==
Carter was survived by several children, of whom his firstborn son Robert Wormeley Carter would continue his planter, diarist and legislative traditions. He is buried at the Lower Lunenburg Parish Church cemetery in Warsaw, Virginia. According to the inventories made of his estate, he owned more than 400 slaves in eight Virginia counties, making him one of the dozen wealthiest men in the Commonwealth. Another scholar found Carter left his heirs 50,000 acres (200 km^{2}) of land and as many as 500 slaves. The Special Collections Research Center at the College of William and Mary holds papers relating to Landon Carter and many other descendants of King Carter. Because of his importance in Virginia (and perhaps the American colonies as a whole), several relatives named sons in his honor. His eldest brother John Carter named one of his sons Landon (1760–1800), who moved to Tennessee with his parents a decade later, and would serve in the Revolutionary War in the Carolinas before becoming a delegate to Tennessee's Constitutional Convention. This man served as a guardian for his brother Charles' son named Landon Carter (of Cleve) (1751–1811), who also served in the American Revolutionary War and briefly represented King George County in the Virginia House of Delegates. Also, his eldest son Robert Wormeley Carter named his son Landon, and that grandson represented Richmond County for one term in 1784.
