= Robert Carter I =

American planter, merchant, and colonial administrator (1664–1732)

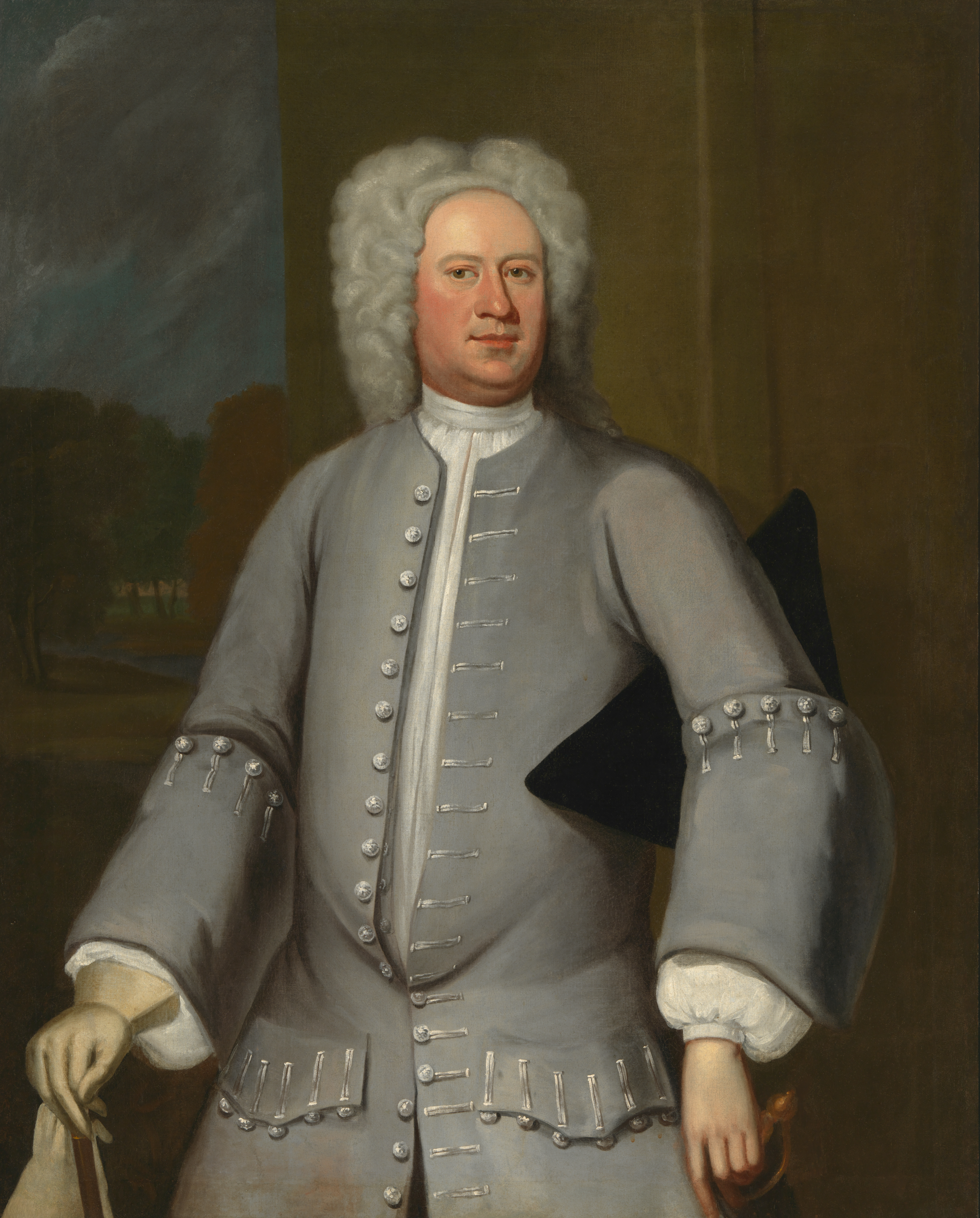
- Portrait, c. 1720

Governor of Virginia
- In office 1726–1727
- Preceded by: Hugh Drysdale
- Succeeded by: Sir William Gooch

25th Speaker of the Virginia House of Burgesses
- In office 1696–1697
- Preceded by: Philip Ludwell
- Succeeded by: William Randolph
- In office 1699–1699
- Preceded by: William Randolph
- Succeeded by: Peter Beverley

Personal details
- Born: c. 1664 Corotoman Plantation, Lancaster County, Virginia, English America
- Died: 4 August 1732 (aged 67–68) Lancaster County, Virginia, British America
- Spouse(s): Judith Armistead; Elizabeth "Betty" Landon Willis
- Children: 15, including Landon Carter, Charles Carter (of Cleve)
- Nickname: King Carter

Robert Carter I (c. 1664 – 4 August 1732) was an American planter, merchant, and colonial administrator who served as the acting governor of Virginia from 1726 to 1727. An agent for the Northern Neck Proprietary, Carter emerged as the wealthiest settler in the British colony of Virginia and received the sobriquet "King Carter" from his contemporaries connoting his autocratic approach and political influence. He also served as speaker of the House of Burgesses and president of the Virginia Governor's Council.

Born around 1664 at Corotoman in Lancaster County, Carter received a classical education and studied the tobacco trade in London. After returning to Virginia, he was elected a burgess in 1691 and represented the electoral constituency of Lancaster County consecutively during the 1695 to 1699 assemblies. He served as Speaker from 1696 to 1697 and in 1699 and Treasurer of Virginia from 1699 to 1705. Appointed to the Governor's Council by Francis Nicholson in 1699, Carter opposed Nicholson's policies in 1704 and influenced the governor's removal in 1705.

Carter was appointed agent of the Northern Neck Proprietary in 1702 though lost the lease to his political opponent, Edmund Jenings, in 1711. He regained the proprietary in 1722 and was involved in the dismissal of Alexander Spotswood. In 1726, he was designated President of the Governor's Council and appointed Acting Governor when his predecessor died in office. Afflicted with gout in later life, Carter died on August 4, 1732, at Corotoman.

== Early life and education ==
Robert Carter I was born around 1664 at Corotoman in Lancaster County, Virginia. Carter's father was John Carter Sr., a merchant, councillor, and burgess who emigrated from London to Virginia in 1635 and settled in Upper Norfolk County by 1640. His mother was Sarah Ludlow Carter, John Carter's fourth wife, who died in 1668. His father died the following year, bequeathing most of his landholdings to Carter's elder half-brother, John Carter Jr., under primogeniture. Carter inherited one thousand acres (400 ha) in Lancaster County, one-third of his personal estate, and several of his father's theology books.

Carter's father arranged provisions for a formal education and noted his second son should study Latin with guidance from a private tutor. John Carter Jr. adhered to his father's instructions and sent his younger half-brother to London about 1673. Placed under the direction of Arthur Bailey, a tobacco merchant and John Carter Sr.'s agent, he received a religious and classical education, gained awareness of the tobacco trade from Bailey, and observed architectural advancements in London engendered by the Great Fire in 1666.

After living in London for six years, Carter returned to Virginia between 1678 and 1679 and resided at Corotoman with John Carter Jr. and his wife, Elizabeth Travers Carter. When his elder half-brother died in 1690, he inherited his landholdings, managed his niece's properties, and obtained a portion from a younger half-brother. On June 10, 1690, he became justice of the peace for Lancaster County, and on November 8, 1690, he was elected as a vestryman for Christ Church Parish. He engaged as churchwarden about 1691, a capacity he would occupy until his death. In 1688, he married Judith Armistead of Hesse, the daughter of planter and councillor John Armistead (1635–1698), then in Gloucester County and currently in Mathews County, and wife Judith Hone (?-1700). They had five children, three of whom survived infancy, including John. Following her death in 1699, Carter married the widow Elizabeth "Betty" Landon Willis, the daughter of Thomas Landon, in 1701. They had five daughters and five sons, seven of whom reached adulthood.

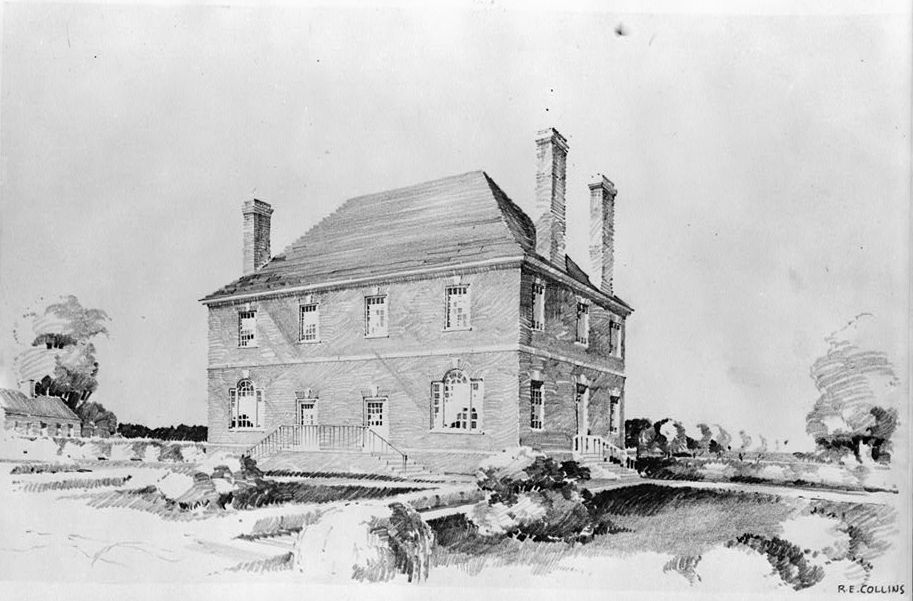
Nomini Hall – Carter family plantation in Westmoreland County, built in 1730 by Robert Carter II on land purchased by Robert Carter I and main residence for Robert Carter III

== Career ==
At age 28, shortly after his elder half-brother, John Carter Jr., died, Robert Carter entered the General Assembly of Virginia as a Burgess representing Lancaster County. He would serve part-time in 1690–1691, and then for five consecutive years (1695 through 1699) before being promoted (by the British Privy Council on the recommendation of Governor Francis Nicholson) to the Governor's Council (also the higher chamber of the Virginia General Assembly). While in the House of Burgesses, Carter served on two important committees (for Elections and Privileges and for Examination of Propositions and Grievances). In the session which began in September 1696, Carter defeated four other burgesses for the position of Speaker, and also served as Speaker for the October 1687 session, but was not re-elected in a five-candidate field in September 1698. However, the House of Burgesses appointed him as the colony's treasurer, thus giving him responsibility of monies raised by assembly-levied taxes in the colony, and assembly-mandated spending. Meanwhile, Carter also became a vestryman of Lancaster County's Christ Church Parish in 1690, and the following year became one of the justices of the peace for Lancaster County (the justices jointly in that era also administering the county, with social services provided by the vestry). He would also command the militias of Lancaster and adjacent Northumberland Counties, and secured appointment as the naval officer of the Rappahannock River region (which secured customs duties).

Ultimately, Carter would become as influential a member of the Governor's Council as he had been in the colony's legislature. He was among the majority of Councillors who opposed Nicholson in 1704, which led indirectly to that governor's dismissal. A decade later, in the controversy between resident Lieutenant Governor Alexander Spotswood and the great planters, Carter sided with his fellow planters opposing Spotswood. After the death of Governor Hugh Drysdale in 1726, as the council's President (by seniority after the death of Edmund Jenings and despite his own poor health), Carter served as acting Governor of Virginia until Lieutenant Governor William Gooch took office on 11 September 1727. Carter continued to attend Council meetings until the General Assembly adjourned on 1 July 1732, five weeks until his death. Meanwhile, much of Carter's land acquisition was as the Virginia resident land agent of Thomas Fairfax, 5th Lord Fairfax of Cameron—known simply as Lord Fairfax. Carter served two terms totaling nearly 20 years, as agent for the Fairfax Proprietary of the Northern Neck of Virginia, essentially the land between the Potomac and Rappahannock rivers westward to the Blue Ridge Mountains. Beginning in his first term, 1702–1711, Carter had his surveyors find the best land, which he patented in his own names as well as in the names of his children, first in the drainage of Rappahannock River, and later the area drained by the Potomac. Carter in 1709 purchased some 20,000 acres (81 km^{2}), including the 6,000-acre (24 km^{2}) Nomini Hall Plantation, also spelled "Nomoni" or "Nominy," from the heirs of Col. Nicholas Spencer. The latter was a cousin of the Lords Culpeper, from whom the Fairfaxes had inherited their Virginia holdings. When Carter became agent for Fairfax's interests again in 1722 (holding that position for a decade, until 1732), in addition to forwarding land rents back to Lord Fairfax, he secured for his children and grandchildren about 110,000 acres (450 km^{2}) in the Northern Neck, as well as additional land in Virginia west of the Blue Ridge Mountains.{citation needed} Thus, when Carter died, he held at least 295,000 acres (1,190 km^{2}). Much of the land was divided into farms and cultivated using enslaved labor and overseers. Tobacco was the primary cash crop, but the farms also produced beans, corn and wheat, as well as cattle and hogs for domestic consumption. Other enterprises in which Carter engaged included sloops and flatboats, and he also acted as agent for slave traders. Carter built a large house at Corotoman in 1725, then saw it burn four years later, but did not rebuild it before he died a four years later. He also suffered from gout.

== Death ==
Carter died on 4 August 1732, in Lancaster County, Virginia. He was buried there at Christ Church. He left his family 300,000 acres (1,200 km^{2}) of land; 3,000 slaves, counted as personal property; and £10,000 in cash, as stated in the academic genealogical study, A Genealogy of the Known Descendants of Robert Carter of Corotoman (1982), written by Florence Tyler Carlton. Some of the papers of his family held by the University of Virginia Library are available in digital form.

When Lord Fairfax saw Carter's obituary in the London monthly The Gentleman's Magazine, he was astonished to read of the immense personal wealth acquired by his resident land agent. Rather than name another Virginian to the position, Fairfax made arrangements to have his cousin, Colonel William Fairfax, move to Virginia to act as land agent, with the paid position of customs inspector (tax collector) for the Potomac River district. Fairfax himself then visited his vast Northern Neck Proprietary from 1735 to 1737, and he moved there permanently in 1747.

== Family and descendants ==
Carter endowed each of his sons who reached marriageable age in his lifetime with significant plantations. Robert Carter II, whom his father called "Robin," would die of a sudden illness months before his father, but his Nomini Hall plantation was inherited by his son, Robert Carter III (1728–1804), who like his grandfather served on the Governor's Council. Charles Carter (1707–1764) would exchange the land he had inherited for other property and built Cleve Hall in King George County, which he represented for many years in the House of Burgesses. Landon Carter received Sabine Hall from his father and represented Richmond County in the House of Burgesses, as well as (in 1742) inherited some of property from his elder half brother John, and served as guardian for those underage nephews Charles Hill Carter, Edward Hill Carter and Robert Carter Nicholas, all of whom would later serve in the Virginia General Assembly. Another brother, George Carter, remained in England, where he practiced law but did not marry (nor take possession of his Virginia inheritance). Carter had five children with his first wife, Judith Armistead:

- Sarah Carter (born c. 1690, died in infancy)
- Elizabeth Carter (c. 1692 – 1734), married Nathaniel Burwell in 1709, then George Nicholas
- Judith Carter (born c. 1694), died in infancy before her mother and her namesake sister and buried near her at Christ Church
- Judith Carter (1695–1750), married Mann Page (1691–1730) of Rosewell plantation in 1718
- John Carter (1696–1742), married Elizabeth Hill of Shirley Plantation

Carter had ten children with his second wife, Elizabeth "Betty" Landon Willis (Credenhill, Herefordshire, 1684–Williamsburg, July 3, 1719), of whom seven reached adulthood:

- Anne Carter (1702–1743), married Benjamin Harrison IV (parents of Benjamin Harrison V and grandparents of President William Henry Harrison)
- Robert Carter II (1704–1732), married Priscilla Churchill, and died four months before his father
- Sarah Carter (c. 1705 – 1705)
- Elizabeth "Betty" Carter (c. 1705 – 1706)
- Charles Carter (1707–1764), married Mary Walker, then Anne Byrd (daughter of Col. William Byrd II), then Lucy Taliaferro (who survived him)
- Ludlow Carter (born c. 1709, died as child)
- Landon Carter (1710–1778), married Maria Byrd, daughter of Col. William Byrd II
- Mary Carter (1712–1736), married George Braxton (parents of Carter Braxton)
- Lucy Carter (1715–1763), married Henry Fitzhugh
- George Carter (1718–1742)

Other notable descendants include:

- Carter Braxton, grandson, signer of Declaration of Independence
- Robert Burwell (1720–1777), grandson, member of the House of Burgesses
- Charles Carter (of Ludlow) (1732–1796), grandson, burgess, delegate and member of the Governor's council
- Charles Hill Carter (1732–1806), grandson, planter (at Shirley plantation) and burgess
- Charles Carter Jr. (burgess), grandson, planter and burgess
- Robert Carter III (1727–1804), grandson, member of the Governor's council
- Talcott Eliason (1826–1896), J.E.B. Stuart's field surgeon during the Civil War
- Robert E. Lee (1807–1870), Confederate States Army general
- Robert Randolph Carter (1825–1888), Confederate States Army first lieutenant
- John Page (1743–1808), 13th Governor of Virginia
- Mann Page (1749–1781), Virginia delegate to the Continental Congress in 1777
- Thomas Nelson Page (1853–1922), U.S. ambassador to Italy during the Woodrow Wilson administration
- William Nelson Page (1854–1932), American civil engineer and industrialist
- James "Gentleman Jim" Robinson, one of the wealthiest African Americans in the Manassas area. His homestead was located between the lines of the Confederate and Union armies during two major battles of the Civil War.

Notable relatives:

- Jimmy Carter (1924–2024), the 39th U.S. President is descended from Robert "King" Carter's uncle, Thomas Carter, who settled in Virginia in 1635.

== See also ==
- Robert Carter III
- Carter's Grove (plantation)
- Corotoman (plantation)
- Rosewell (plantation)
- Shirley Plantation
- Christ Church
- History of slavery in the United States
