= Ralph Wormeley =

Ralph Wormeley may refer to:

- Ralph Wormeley Sr. (c. 1620–1651), planter and politician who represented York County in the Virginia House of Burgesses
- Ralph Wormeley Jr. (1651–1701), planter and politician who represented Middlesex County in the Virginia House of Burgesses
- Ralph Wormeley (Virginia politician) (1715–1789), planter and politician who represented Middlesex County in the Virginia House of Burgesses
- Ralph Wormeley (delegate) (1745–1806), Virginia planter who represented Middlesex County in the Virginia House of Delegates

== See also ==
- Ralph Wormeley Curtis (1854–1922), American painter and graphic artist
