= John Robinson (burgess) =

Royal Governor of Virginia
- In office August 14, 1749 – August 24, 1749
- Preceded by: William Gooch
- Succeeded by: Thomas Lee

Council of State of Virginia
- In office 1721 – August 24, 1749

Member of the House of Burgesses for Middlesex County
- In office 1710–1714 Serving with Christopher Robinson
- Preceded by: Harry Beverley
- Succeeded by: William Blackborn

Personal details
- Born: circa 1683 Middlesex County, Colony of Virginia, British America
- Died: August 24, 1749 Yorktown, Colony of Virginia, British America
- Spouse: Katherine Beverley
- Children: 8 including John Robinson Jr., Beverley Robinson
- Relatives: Christopher Robinson (father), Christopher Robinson (brother)
- Occupation: planter, politician

John Robinson (1683 - August 24, 1749) was an American planter and politician in the colony of Virginia. Robinson acquired significant landholdings (farmed using enslaved and indentured labor) and held several public offices in Colonial Virginia, including two terms as one of the representatives of Middlesex County in the House of Burgesses and nearly three decades on the Governor's Council (rising to become its President). He may be best known either for the final weeks of his life, when he was acting Governor of Virginia, or as the father of John Robinson Jr., who served as Speaker of the House of Burgesses and as the colony's Treasurer for more than three decades.

== Early and family life ==
This John Robinson was probably born on one of this father's plantations in Middlesex County, Virginia in 1683 to the former Agatha Obert (1649-1686) and her merchant and planter husband Christopher Robinson (1645-1693). He had an elder brother, Christopher Robinson (1681-1726), who also followed their father's paths as a planter and politician. During their childhood, their father grew in political power in Virginia (eventually becoming the colony's secretary) as well built a manor house which this man would inherit, and which survives today, Hewick Plantation, near modern Urbanna. Although their mother died when both were young boys, their father remarried, to the widow Katherine Hone Beverley (1643-1692), the daughter of burgess Theophilus Hone and widow of Major Robert Beverley, a wealthy planter and clerk of the House of Burgesses. The will provided that neighboring planter, merchant and burgess William Churchill would become the estate's executor. By 1694 there were only 528 li in accounts receivable and personal property remaining, but Churchill assumed their father's merchant connection with Jeffreys of London and managed the boys' lands til they came of age in 1701 and 1703.

Upon reaching legal age, John Robinson, Jr. married Katherine Beverley (1684-1726), who bore six sons and two daughters who survived to adulthood, most of whom married into the First Families of Virginia. They sent their eldest son, Christopher Robinson (1703-1738) to England for his education, but he died unmarried at Oriel College of Oxford University. Thus, they kept John Robinson Jr. (1705-1766) in Virginia to finish his education, and he followed his father's (and maternal uncles') path into agriculture and politics. Another son, William Robinson (1709-1792) moved to Spotsylvania County and married Agatha, the daughter of Henry Beverley; his brother Henry Robinson (1718-1758) married Mary Waring. Robert Robinson (b. 1711) became Captain of the East Indiaman and would be buried at Gravesend in England. The youngest son, Beverley Robinson (1722-1792), would leave Virginia with a company of Virginia soldiers to defend the New York frontier, then married an heiress in that state, but ultimately become a Loyalist during the American Revolution and moved to and died in Britain. Their two daughters were Mary Robinson (1707-1739) and Catherine Robinson Wagoner (1715-1776).

== Career ==
Robinson owned significant acreage in Tidewater Virginia, which he farmed using indentured labor, and increasingly using enslaved labor. He also represented Middlesex County (part time) in the House of Burgesses alongside his elder brother Christopher Robinson.

When Governor William Gooch retired and sailed back to England, possibly on August 14, Robinson as head of the Governor's Council, became the colony's acting governor. No record exists of Robinson's taking the oath of office, possibly because the Governor's ship was becalmed in the York River, and following Robinson's death on August 24 (and the resignation for health reasons of the next-senior Councilor, John Custis), Governor Gooch returned ashore to convene a special session of the Governor's Council, which designated Councilor Thomas Lee as acting Governor, as Lee would certify to the Board of Trade. However, Thomas Lee also died, so Lewis Burwell I/II became the colony's acting governor, before Governor Robert Dinwiddie finally arrived in 1751.

== Death and legacy ==
Robinson died at the home of fellow Councilor Thomas Nelson in Yorktown, Virginia on August 24, 1749. His remains were returned to Middlesex County for burial.
