= Christopher Wormeley (died 1698) =

Virginia colony tobacco planter and politician)

Colonel Christopher Wormeley
- Died: died 1698; Middlesex County, Virginia Colony
- Occupations: soldier, planter, politician
- Relatives: Ralph Wormeley Jr.

Virginia Militia
- In office 1667–1698

Member of the Virginia Governor's Council
- In office 1683–1698

Christopher Wormeley was a prominent planter, militia officer, and colonial official in Middlesex and James City Counties, Virginia. He first appears in the records in 1662 as a witness of a power of attorney filed in Rappahannock County. Through his marriage to Frances (Armistead) Aylmer Elliott, he acquired substantial landholdings and social standing. He served as vestryman, militia colonel, justice of the peace, high sheriff, and was later appointed to the Governor's Council. He held extensive lands in Middlesex, James City, and Rappahannock Counties and served as Naval Officer and Collector of customs duties in the Potomac region until his death.

Christopher is related to the Wormeley family that lived at Rosegill, Middlesex County, Virginia; however, the exact nature of that relationship is unknown.

== Personal life ==
Christopher Wormeley was born about 1641, and died in 1698. He was married three times, with his first marriage occurring in 1666 to Francis (Armistead) Aylmer Elliott. Wormly later married Elizabeth (Travers) Carter in 1690, and Margaret Wormley sometime after March 5, 1693. Margaret Wormley reportedly died before June 20, 1698. She is buried in Christopher Wormeley Garden, Middlesex County, Virginia.

== Career ==
Christopher first appears in surviving Virginia records on May 5, 1662, when he witnessed a power of attorney from Cuthbert Potter to Mathew Bellamy that was filed in Rappahannock County, Virginia. He may have been living at Rosegill, Middlesex County, the home of the other Wormeley family living in Middlesex County. This is the only connection of Christopher to Rosegill.

Following his marriage to Frances (Armistead) Aylmer Elliott in 1666, Christopher’s public career advanced rapidly. On December 31, 1666, he joined the vestry of Christ Church in Lancaster County. He had received a commission as a captain in the militia by 30 January 1666/7. Captain Christopher Wormeley became a justice of the peace for Lancaster County on May 8, 1667. His wealth and social status are reflected in the Lancaster County tithables lists of 1667 and 1668, where he was assessed with nineteen tithables each year—the fourth-highest total in the “Southside,” the portion of Lancaster County that later became Middlesex County. These figures indicate that he was a substantial landholder employing numerous laborers.

In addition to land acquired through marriage, Christopher was given a patent for 800 acres in Rappahannock County on April 22, 1668, expanding his holdings and influence.

Middlesex County created 1669

When Middlesex County was created in 1669 from part of Lancaster County, Christopher continued his leadership role. He continued as a Captain of the militia. By November 5, 1672, he had been promoted to colonel and by 2 March 1673/4 he was the “High Sheriff” of the county a position he held until May 1674. By July of that year, he was justice of the peace for Middlesex County.

Bacon’s Rebellion 1676-1677

During Bacon's Rebellion, mostly white current or former indentured servants first attacked Native peoples, seeking their land, then seized wealthy landowners and vandalized their properties. Christopher Wormeley, Henry Chicheley, Ralph Wormeley and neighbors (and sometime burgesses) Christopher Robinson, Walter Whitaker and John Burnham would all be taken hostage and parts of their plantations destroyed, before Robert Beverley and his flying squadron pacified the county on behalf of Governor Berkeley. Burnham, Wormeley and Chicheley, and other Middlesex justices of the peace (with Robert Lee and Nicholas Spencer from Westmoreland County, who also were target's of Bacon's rebels in attendance), all sat as a court at Richard Robinson's house to hear Christopher Wormeley's suit against the Baconians on September 7, 1677.

On July 22, 1680, he was again appointed as sheriff of Middlesex County for the ensuing year. By 21 February 1683/4 Christopher was serving on the Virginia Governor’s Council, the colony’s upper governing body and advisory council to the governor. Membership in the Council placed him among the most powerful men in colonial Virginia.

Christopher managed and disposed of extensive landholdings acquired through marriage and grant. After his wife’s death Christopher disposed of his life estate in land 1,460 acres Rappahannock County on November 2, 1686. He had acquired this his interest in this land through marriage to his first wife. His son William, the heir of his mother, sold his remainder in this land shortly after he turned 21 in 1688. Christopher received a patent for 800 acres in Middlesex County on April 21, 1690. He also acquired a plantation in James City County.

Christopher also held important customs and naval administrative offices. On April 5, 1692, Christopher was confirmed as Naval Officer and Collector of their Majesties Duties in Potomack. A position he held until his death. On 9 March 1697/8 Christopher was sworn as the Collector of their Majesties Duties of Rappahannock, further expanding his authority.

Will of Christopher Wormeley

Christopher wrote his will on June 20, 1698. His will was submitted to the Middlesex County Court on July 4, 1698. It was proved on July 7, 1701.

"[L]egatees, to son, William Wormeley, all that plantation called Pohetan [Powhatan], and 5 negroes, and all horses, cattle, household stuff, &c., belonging to the said plantation called Pohetan, in James City county. To son, Thomas Wormeley, and daughter, Judith Wormeley, all lands and plantations in Middlesex, together with the English servants, and slaves of all sorts, with all plate, linen, woolen, money in England, merchandizing goods, household stuff, horses, cattle, sheep, hogs, plows, carts, cart-wheels, or any manner of working tools; the utensils belonging to the kitchen and dairy; said goods to be equally divided and used during the lives of said son and daughter, and profits of lands also equally divided, and if said son Thos. dies without issue, all his estate to revert to said daughter. And in case she then dies without issue, to son, William. His desire to be buried in his own garden betwixt his first wife, Frances, and "my last wife," Margaret, and that place to be walled in. To friend, Wm. Churchill, 40 shillings for a ring. To son William Wormeley, £50 sterling to buy two negroes. Son Thomas and daughter Judith, executors, and friend Wm. Churchill, desired to assist them."

== Children ==
Christopher Wormeley and Frances Armistead had the following children:

| Order | Name | Dates | Marriages |
|---|---|---|---|
| i. | William | 1667–1699 |
| ii. | Thomas | -c1699 |
| iii. | Frances | -1680 |
| iv. | Judith | 1683–1720 | m. 1) Corbin Griffin, 2) William Beverley, 3) Christopher Robinson |

== Legacy ==
Christopher Wormeley’s career illustrates the path of a successful colonial Virginia planter and official. Through advantageous marriages, land acquisition, and public service, he rose to become a leading member of Virginia’s political elite.
