= Christopher Robinson (Virginia politician) =

American 17th century politician

Member of the Governor's Council
- In office 1692–1693

Member of the House of Burgesses for Middlesex
- In office 1685–1692 Serving with Robert Dudley, William Churchill
- Preceded by: Abraham Weekes
- Succeeded by: John Cant
- In office 1680–1682
- Preceded by: John Burnham
- Succeeded by: Abraham Weekes

Personal details
- Born: c. 1645 Cleasby, North Riding of Yorkshire, England
- Died: February 13, 1693 (aged 47–48) Middlesex County, Virginia, English America
- Spouses: Agatha Obert (m. 1673; died 1686) Katherine Hone Beverley (m. 1687)
- Children: 8, including Christopher and John
- Occupation: Merchant; planter; militia officer; politician

Christopher Robinson (c. 1645 – February 13, 1693) was an English-born merchant, planter, militia officer and politician in the British colony of Virginia. Robinson held several public offices in Colonial Virginia and is the patriarch in America for one of the First Families of Virginia.

== Early life ==
Robinson was born in Cleasby, Yorkshire, England in 1645. His parents were John Robinson (d. 1651) and Elizabeth Potter (d. 1688). Christopher was one of eight siblings. His eldest surviving brother John Robinson became Bishop of London and his sister Clara married Sir Edward Wood, Gentleman Usher to Queen Catherine. Bishop John Robinson created a pedigree which traced the family back several generations where it becomes "obscure".

== Virginia career ==
Robinson emigrated to Virginia about 1666 and settled at Urbanna in Middlesex County. There he established a plantation and home he called "Hewick". Several generations of Robinsons would expand the home, as well as acquired other plantations and erected other manor homes nearby.

Initially, Robinson was private secretary for Sir William Berkeley, Governor of Virginia.

In 1672, Britain chartered the Royal African Company, and Robinson, his Middlesex neighbor William Churchill and Dudley Digges of Gloucester County were their local agents by 1685. In 1668, Middlesex county had 65 blacks and 334 white servants. In 1685 alone, the Royal African Company took delivery of 200 Africans, and another 220 Africans in 1687. By 1700, the county's population had grown and more land was under cultivation, but the percentage of indentured servants declined and slaves outnumbered indentured servants by a four to one ratio.

Robinson became the Middlesex county clerk in 1675 and continued until resigning in 1688. Thus, he held office during Bacon's Rebellion, in which he supported Governor Berkeley, who was removed by the Board of Trade shortly afterward.

Middlesex County voters first elected Robinson as one of their representatives to the House of Burgesses in 1685 (when Robert Beverley was prevented from taking the other seat, having become clerk of that body), and re-elected him until his elevation to the Virginia Governor's Council. Robinson served on the council about two years, from October 26, 1691 until his death in 1693. During roughly the same period, Robinson served as the colony's secretary of state.

In 1686 Robinson became the coroner of Middlesex County, and colonel of the county militia beginning on December 12, 1687. His area of influence grew in 1787 because of the death of Robert Beverley, who had helped suppress Bacon's Rebellion, in part because Robinson married the widow. Beverley had himself taken up the mercantile and political connections of John Burnham, a major Middlesex County planter merchant of the 1670s. Upon this man's death, Gawin Corbin would similarly enter the political elite, although merchant and former burgess William Churchill would become executor of this man's estate and raised his two minor sons (and married the widow of powerful burgess Ralph Wormeley Jr. in 1703, around the time the Robinson boys came into their inheritance, and raised Wormeley's three young sons (although Gawin Corbin was executor of Wormeley's estate). Meanwhile, on February 8, 1693, not long before his death Robinson became one of the first Trustees of The College of William & Mary.

== Marriage and legacy ==
Coat of Arms of Christopher Robinson

Robinson married first, Agatha Obert (1649–1686), daughter of Bertram Obert, and through this union increased his land holdings in Virginia. They had children, including John (1683–1749), who became president of the Governor's Council, then briefly acting governor when Governor Gooch returned to England, and Christopher (1681–1727), who inherited his father's estate and that of his uncle, John Robinson, Bishop of London. Agatha died January 25, 1686 (by today's calendar), and her death was recorded in the Register of Christ Church Parish in Middlesex County.

Robinson remarried, to Katherine Hone, the widow of fellow burgess Major Robert Beverley, on September 17, 1687, in Middlesex County. Some disagree over whether Katherine was the daughter or the widow of burgess Theophilus Hone. Both Christopher Robinson Jr. and his younger brother John Robinson Sr. would also serve in the House of Burgesses, and John Robinson Sr. also served many years on the Governor's Council. His son (this Robinson's grandson) was John Robinson, Speaker of the House of Burgesses, but whose death in 1766 uncovered a scandal.

The Robinson family split during the American War of Independence. Some fought for independence; others remained loyal to the King of England, including the youngest son, Colonel Beverley Robinson, who commanded the Loyal American Regiment and was involved in the treason of Benedict Arnold. A great-granddaughter, Judith Robinson, married Carter Braxton, a signer of the United States Declaration of Independence. After the Revolution, the Loyalist family members returned to England or migrated to Canada, where some of the family, among them Sir John Robinson, 1st Baronet, of Toronto, enjoyed some considerable success.

== See also ==
- Tobacco in the American colonies
