= Ralph Wormeley (delegate) =

American planter and politician (1745–1806)

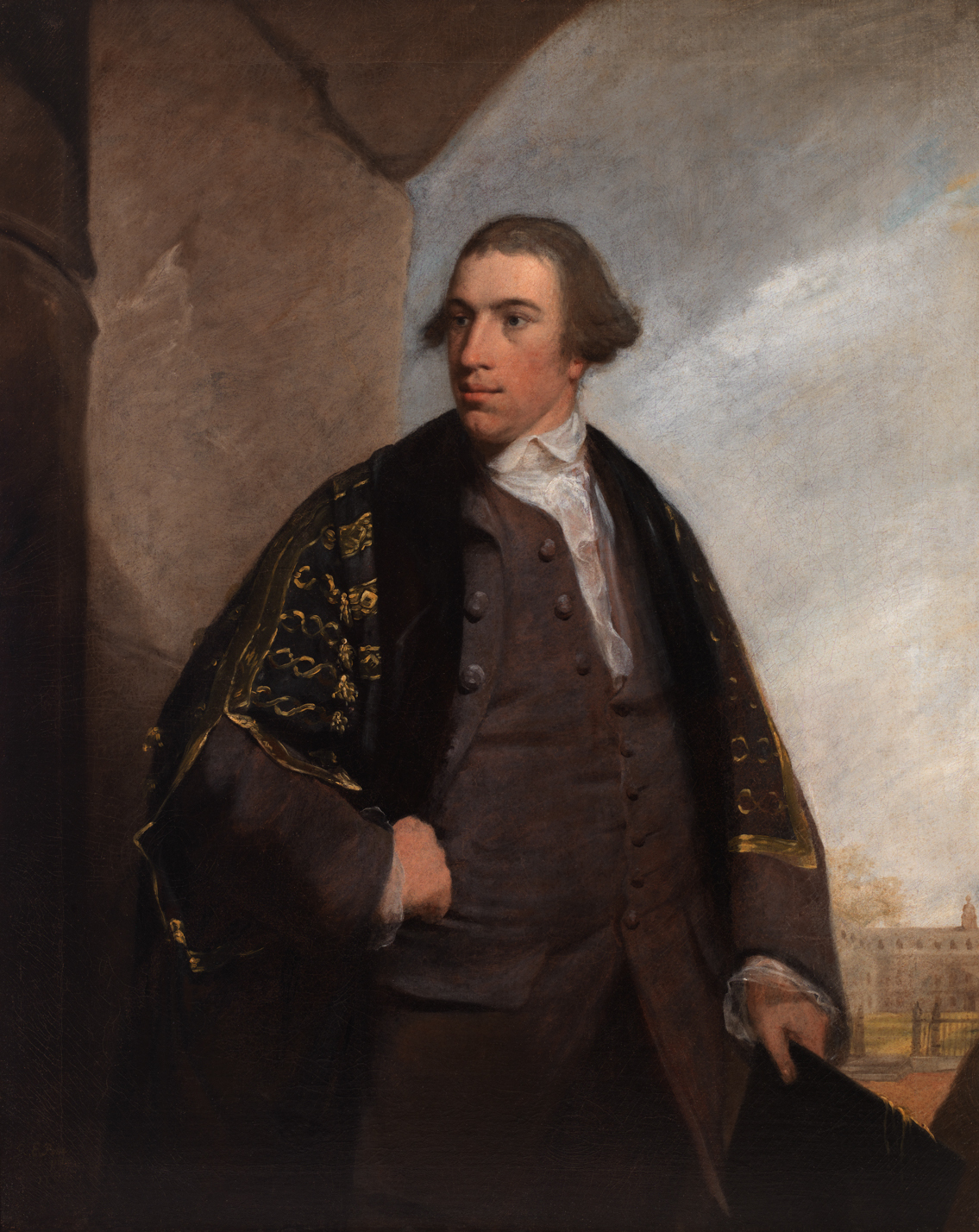
- Portrait by Robert Edge Pine, c. 1763

Member of the Virginia House of Delegates for Middlesex County
- In office June 30, 1788 – October 17, 1791 Serving with Francis Corbin
- Preceded by: Overton Corby
- Succeeded by: Overton Corby

Member of the Governor's Advisory Council of the Colony of Virginia
- In office 1771–1775 Serving with Robert Burwell, William Byrd III, John Camm, Robert Carter III, Richard Corbin, George William Fairfax, Philip Ludwell Lee, Thomas Nelson Jr., William Nelson, John Page, John Tayloe
- Preceded by: James Horrocks
- Succeeded by: position abolished

Personal details
- Born: April 1745 Rosegill plantation
- Died: January 19, 1806 (aged 60) Rosegill plantation, Middlesex County, Virginia
- Spouse: Eleanor Tayloe
- Relations: Ralph Wormeley Sr. Ralph Wormeley Jr.(great-grandfather); Ralph Wormeley IV(father)
- Education: Eton; Trinity Hall, Cambridge University
- Occupation: Planter, politician

Ralph Wormeley (April 1745 – January 19, 1806) was an American planter and politician who served as a member of the Governor's Advisory Council (1771-1775), was suspected of being a Loyalist during the American Revolutionary War, and after the conflict represented Middlesex County, Virginia in the Virginia House of Delegates (1788-1791) as well as at the Virginia Ratifying Convention of 1788, where he voted in favor of ratification of the federal Constitution.

== Early and family life ==
Portrait by John Wollaston, c. 1755–58

Born to the former Jane Bowles of Maryland at the Wormeley family's Rosegill plantation in 1745. His name honored not only his burgess father, as well as two paternal ancestors who had served on the colony's governor's council, Ralph Wormeley Sr. and Ralph Wormeley Jr. He received a private education locally as befit his class, then traveled to England when he was twelve to finish his education at Eton, then at Trinity Hall of Cambridge University, from which he graduated when he was 18. His sister Elizabeth (1737-1785) became the second wife of merchant Dudley Digges of Yorktown, who was a burgess and member of the colony's governor's council.

== Career ==
After returning from England with a commission as Comptroller for the Rappahannock River port (collecting tobacco taxes), he began a mixed career of public offices and tobacco export, first assisting his father with the family's Rosegill plantation. He also became known for his literary tastes and socialized with the local gentry (including George Washington. In June 1771 Wormeley accepted an appointment to the Virginia Governor's Council, essentially the upper house of the Virginia General Assembly, and despite speaking against new taxation measures, remained until the beginning of the American Revolutionary War.

On April 4, 1776, patriots intercepted his letter to fellow planter John R. Grymes concerning Lord Dunmore, which prompted Virginia authorities to require that he post a large bond and remain on his father's western Virginia lands, despite his protests. His two brothers were Loyalists and took up arms in the conflict, and one would return to Britain after the conflict. In 1781 a British privateer raided Rosegill and nearby plantations, prompting both Wormeley and his father to petition the US government for compensation, particularly since when the captured slaves were recovered after the Franco-American victory at Yorktown they had smallpox.

Following the conflict, Middlesex County voters thrice elected Wormeley as one of their representatives to the Virginia House of Delegates (1788-1791). Wormeley also represented Middlesex county at the Virginia Ratifying Convention of 1788, where he voted in favor of ratification of the federal Constitution. Wormeley (or his son of the same name) also served as Middlesex county sheriff in 1794 and 1795.

In the 1787 tax census, Ralph Wormeley was responsible for two white adult males who lived in Middlesex County, as well as 54 adult slaves, 35 teenaged slaves, 13 horses including a stud horse, and 226 cattle. The "non-tithable" annotation can indicate the owner as an office-holder, and this man was a legislator at the time. In the 1810 federal census (after his death, but during the life of his namesake son), his son Ralph VI owned 32 slaves and his widow Eleanor 84 slaves in Middlesex County.

== Personal life ==
On November 19, 1772 Wormeley married Eleanor Tayloe (1755-1815) of Mt. Airy plantation, the daughter of John Tayloe II who sat on the Governor's Council with this man. She survived him by nearly a decade, despite bearing seven children (several of whom died young). Their two eldest sons, Ralph Wormeley VI and John Wormeley, reached adulthood, but each died before this man (their father). Thus the family name was continued by Warner Lewis Wormeley (1785- ), whose son Dr. Carter Warner Wormeley (1815-1892) of King William County spent time in northern prisons for his ardent support of the Confederacy. Two of this man's daughters married within the First Families of Virginia, Jane Wormeley (1776- ) married Carter Beverley and Sarah Tayloe Wormeley (1789-1875) married Dr. George D. Nicholson, then William Kennon Perrin. Their two sons, William Kennon Perrin II (1834-1904) and John Tayloe Perrin (1836-1904), were both Confederate officers with the 26th Virginia Infantry.

== Death and legacy ==
Coat of Arms of Ralph Wormeley

Wormeley died at his Rosegill home on January 19, 1806. He and his wife are buried at Christ Church cemetery in Middlesex County. Significant acreage from Rosegill plantation was sold by his executors to pay his debts, and the manor house left family control well before the American Civil War. Although contemporaries praised Wormeley's collection of books (some of which were collected by his great-grandfather), many books and family portraits were lost in subsequent fires. Nonetheless, Rosegill plantation survives today, and has been on the National Register of Historic Places since 1973. The Library of Virginia has his family Bible and some family papers, as well as several petitions he made to Virginia authorities.
