= William Churchill (burgess) =

Virginia planter and politician

Member of the Governor's Council for the Colony of Virginia
- In office 1705–1710

Member of the House of Burgesses for Middlesex County
- In office 1703–1705 Serving with Gawin Corbin
- Preceded by: Edwin Thacker
- Succeeded by: Christopher Robinson
- In office 1691–1692 Serving with Christopher Robinson Sr.
- Preceded by: Robert Dudley
- Succeeded by: Mathew Kemp

Personal details
- Born: 1649 North Aston parish, Oxfordshire, England
- Died: November 1710 (aged 60–61) Bushy Park plantation, Westmoreland County, Colony of Virginia
- Spouse: Elizabeth Armistead Wormeley
- Children: Armistead Churchill, Elizabeth, Priscilla
- Occupation: Merchant, lawyer, planter, politician

William Churchill (1649–1710) emigrated from England and became a Virginia merchant, planter and politician who twice briefly served in the House of Burgesses representing Middlesex County, Virginia, and on the Virginia Governor's Council (1705–1710).

== Early life and education ==
He was born in Oxfordshire, England, the youngest of eleven children born to John Churchill (1591–1655) and his wife Dorothy Churchill (1607–1670), and usually spelled his surname with a double "h". He attended university and the Middle Temple. Admitted to the bar.

He may have married and been widowed in England before emigrating to the Virginia colony.

== Career ==
Churchill emigrated to Virginia, where he became a merchant (factor for London merchants John and Jeffrey Jeffreys) as well as lawyer and planter. He was a witness for a document dated February 1, 1675. His business was importing merchandise and servants, and exporting tobacco, and within a decade he hired his own factor to collect debts owed him.

His first public office (in November 1675) was undersherrif of Middlesex County. He won re-election in 1677. A decade later (October 14, 1687), Churchill became one of the county's justices of the peace, who collectively administered the county in that era, and remained on that body until 1705. He also became a churchwarden of Christ Church parish. Churchill would become a colonel, leading the county militia by 1706.

Churchill's main plantations in Middlesex County, operated using enslaved labor, were "Bushy Park" and "Wilton". By 1704 Churchill was one of that county's largest landowners, owning 1950 acres, as well as 2280 acres in nearby Richmond County by the time of his death. After his marriage to Elizabeth Armistead Wormeley, he lived at Rosegill plantation, which he administered pursuant to a prenuptial contract discussed below.

Churchill was an agent of the Royal African Company, which sold Africans (mostly after initial shipments to the Caribbean) in Triangular trade. Churchill also sold indentured servants as well as goods, often in exchange for tobacco to export or mortgages on land. Within a decade, in addition to acting as a lawyer on behalf of the London merchant Jeffreys, Churchill hired a factor to assist him in collecting debts. Unlike many of his contemporaries, Churchill allowed some of his slaves' children to be baptized. An inventory of his estate, recorded fur years after his death, included 61 enslaved people.

Middlesex County voters twice elected Churchill as one of their representatives in the House of Burgesses

After the death of the large multi-county landowner Ralph Wormeley in 1702, Churchill courted and married the widowed Elizabeth Armistead Wormeley (1667–1716). Churchill signed a prenuptual agreement protecting her children's inheritance (from her father, John Armistead, as well as from Wormeley). Churchill then helped raise her children, including two sons and two daughters who reached adulthood. Ralph Wormeley III returned from his studies in England to accept his inheritance but died in 1711 before marrying, whereupon his brother John Wormeley (who prided himself on not becoming involved in politics) inherited, and his son Ralph Wormeley IV would resume the political aspect of Wormeley tradition. Churchill also raised Letitia Wormeley (1692–1770, who never married), and her sister Judith (1695–1716), who married burgess Mann Page, whose main plantation in nearby Gloucester County was called "Rosewell."

In 1705 Churchill received a coveted appointment to the Virginia Governor's Council (the upper house of the Virginia General Assembly), succeeding Edwin Thacker. He took office together with the new governor, Edward Nott. One of Churchill's assigned tasks was determining which of the Rappahannock River's branches was the main course, important for determining the southern boundary of the Northern Neck Proprietary.

== Personal life ==
Coat of Arms of William Churchill

Churchill had been married to a woman named Mary in 1683, but no documentation has yet been found concerning their marriage date, her former surname, nor death. In 1703, Churchill married the widow Elizabeth Armistead Wormeley and raised not only her children, but was the guardian for the offspring of former burgess and Councillor Christopher Robinson. Elizabeth A.W. Churchill also bore two daughters and a son during this marriage. The boy, Armistead Churchill (1704–1763), inherited his father's estate, held various local offices and began construction of "Wilton" manor house, which remains today. Both of his daughters married members of the Virginia Governor's Council. Priscilla married Robert Carter II (1704–1732) of Nomini plantation in Westmoreland County, the namesake son of "King" Carter (who was probably the richest man in Virginia of his day, as well as sat on the Governor's Council). After his death (months before King Carter), Priscilla Churchill Carter (1705–1763) married John Lewis (1694–1754), also a member of the Governor's Council. His daughter Elizabeth Churchill (1709–1779) married burgess and later Councillor William Bassett (1709–1744) of Eltham plantation in New Kent County. In this way, William Churchill was great-grandfather of 9th President of the United States of America William Henry Harrison.

== Death and legacy ==
Churchill attended his last meeting of the Governor's Council on October 27, 1710, and executed his last will and testament on November 8, 1710. That document quoted 2 Kings 20:1: Set thine House in Order for thou shalt Dye and not Live." The document included charitable bequests in addition to ordering his estate. Churchill died about two weeks later, since Lieutenant Governor Alexander Spotswood wrote on December 15 that Churchill had died three weeks previously. Because Churchill may have contracted his final illness in the colonial capital, he may have died there, or managed to return to Bushy Park. Because he directed that he be buried without conspicuous ceremony, it remains unclear whether he was buried in Williamsburg or Middlesex County. His widow survived him by six years. His son and principal heir, Armistead Churchill (1704–1763) completed his education, married into the gentry and continued operating his plantations using enslaved labor. Armistead Churchill named his eldest son to honor his father and was himself nominated to the Governor's Advisory Council in 1731, but never received a royal authorization, possibly because he preferred his lucrative appointment as Naval Officer for the Rappahannock district, as well as local offices.

Churchill's Bushy Park plantation house burned by 1760, but by that time, Armistead Churchill and his eldest son built Wilton manor house, which remains today. Another son, Armistead Churchill Jr., married Elizabeth Blackwell of Fauquier County and moved to Kentucky in 1787, where they owned several tracts of land near Louisville, one of which survives as Churchill Downs. Some of his grandchildren fought as patriots in the American Revolutionary War.
