= Christopher Wormeley =

Governor of Tortuga and Virginia politician (d. 1645)

Captain Christopher Wormeley
- Died: before 20 December 1645; York County, Virginia Colony
- Other name: Capt. Wormley
- Occupations: soldier, planter, politician
- Relatives: Ralph Wormeley Sr.

Governor of Tortuga
- In office 1632–1635
- Preceded by: Capt. Anthony Hilton

Member of the Virginia Governor's Council
- In office 1637–1642

Christopher Wormeley (fl. 1631-died before 20 December 1645) was an English military officer who served as governor of Tortuga before becoming the secretary of state for the Virginia Colony (1635–1649) as well as captain of the fort at Old Point Comfort beginning in 1638. He also served on the Virginia Governor's Council (1637–1642), as would his younger brother Ralph Wormeley Sr.

== Early life and education ==
He had a younger brother Ralph who had emigrated to the Virginia colony by 1635. The family could trace its descent from Sir John de Wormeley (or De Wormele) of Hadfield, York County, England.

== Military and bureaucratic career ==
On July 6, 1631, the Providence Island Company commissioned Captain Wormeley to succeed Anthony Hilton in governing the island called "Association", better known as Tortuga off mainland Hispaniola. In January, 1635, the island was captured by the Spanish Empire.

After the capture of Tortuga, Captain Wormeley sailed to Virginia Colony. In 1636, he was appointed a justice of the peace for what was initially called Charles River County (but became York County in 1634). Shortly thereafter, Wormeley was appointed a member of the Virginia Governor's Council, and as such supported the unpopular governor John Harvey. Wormeley also commanded the militia of Charles River and Elizabeth City counties in 1639 and 1640. Beginning in 1638, Wormeley was captain of the fort at Old Point Comfort. When the colony's secretary, Mathew Kemp, fled to England in 1640, Wormeley may have accompanied him, both being unpopular, and had difficulty returning to Virginia. Wormeley later confessed to having unjustly adjudicated against a man named Taylor while a commissioner for Elizabeth City county, and the royal council ordered him to make reparation to Taylor, but did not disbar him from the Virginia governor's council when he returned.

== Planter ==
Wormeley acquired 1,420 acres on the York River, including the east side of what became known as Wormeley Creek and established a plantation. At least two of the people for whose immigration he paid and thus acquired the right to patent land were enslaved Africans. Wormeley or his son hosted several prominent royalist exiles at his plantation in 1650 (including Sir Thomas Lunsford, Sir Henry Chicheley, Sir Philip Honywood and Col. Manwaring Hammond).

== Personal life ==
Wormeley married Mary (last name unknown) in England, who bore at least one child who survived him, as well as accompanied him to the Virginia colony and remarried after his death. His daughter Elizabeth successively married colonial secretary Richard Kemp, councillor Thomas Lunsford and Major General Robert Smith.

== Death and legacy ==
Wormeley last attended governor's council meetings in 1642 and 1643, so one biographer believes he died in that year. Digitized York County records (note: York County records are missing from 26 April 1642 to November ( ? ) 1645) show he attended York County Court on 26 April 1642 as a justice of the peace and that his will was admitted to probate by 20 December 1645, with Ralph Wormeley and his widow Mary as executors (Mary later married to Captain William Brocas, who later made appearances on her behalf). However, another biographer believes he died in 1656, possibly because a British sea captain of the same name died in Yorkshire in 1655.
