= Richard Kemp (disambiguation) =

Richard Kemp (born 1959) is a retired British Army officer.

Richard Kemp may also be:

- Richard Kemp (governor) (c.1600-c.1650), official of the British Colony of Virginia
- Richard Kemp (politician), Liverpool official
- Richard Kemp (LSD manufacturer), an illicit LSD manufacturer
