= Chicheley (disambiguation) =

Chicheley is a village in the Borough of Milton Keynes in Buckinghamshire, England.

Chicheley may also refer to:

- Henry Chicheley (1614/1615–1683), Lieutenant Governor and Acting Governor of Virginia Colony
- Sir Thomas Chicheley (1614–1699), MP, Master of the Ordnance, High Sheriff of Cambridgeshire

== See also ==
- Chicheley Hall
- Chichele
