= Richard Kemp (governor) =

Virginia colonial governor

Sir Richard Kemp

Acting Governor of the Virginia Colony
- In office June 1644-June 1645
- Preceded by: Sir William Berkeley
- Succeeded by: Sir William Berkeley

Member of the Virginia Governor's Council
- In office 1634-1649

Personal details
- Born: c. 1600 Norfolk, England
- Died: c. 1650 Virginia Colony, British America
- Spouse: Elizabeth Wormeley
- Children: 1
- Profession: Colonial secretary, governor

Sir Richard Kemp (c. 1600 – c. 1650) was a planter and politician in the Colony of Virginia. Kemp served as the Colony's Secretary and on the Governor's Council from 1634 to 1649. As the council's senior member, he also served as the acting Colonial Governor of Virginia from 1644 to 1645 during travels by Governor Sir William Berkeley. Kemp had also worked closely relation with Berkeley's predecessor, Sir John Harvey.

== Early and family life ==
Kemp was born around 1600 in Norfolk, England, the third son of Robert and Dorothy Kemp of Gissing. His relation with William Kempe, formerly of Howes in Leicestershire, England who had represented the "upper parts of Elizabeth City"" in the House of Burgesses in 1629-1630 is unclear.

== Political career ==
In 1634, King Charles I appointed Kemp as secretary of the Colony of Virginia, to succeed William Claiborne. Kemp also became a member of the Virginia Governor's Council, serving from 1634 to 1649. Kemp was a political ally and friend of Sir John Harvey, the first royally appointed Colonial Governor of Virginia, who served until 1639.

As the secretary for the Virginia colony, Kemp was responsible (and received fees) for issuing permits and grants, handling legal paperwork, and overseeing all official correspondence with the King. By 1639, Kemp had started to lose favor within the colony for siding with Sir John Harvey, in what became the Second Anglo-Powhatan War. Harvey had also incurred the wrath of Rev. Anthony Panton, who had friends in England, in part for chastising Rev. Panton's mockery of Kemp's coiffure. Kemp stowed away to England to plead his case to King Charles I to allow him to resume his duties as Secretary for the Colony of Virginia. Kemp returned to Virginia in 1642 with the colony's new appointed governor, Sir William Berkeley. In 1646, Governor Berkeley gave Kemp the right to appoint each county's clerk of court, which proved lucrative as well as controversial.

He assumed the role of acting Colonial Governor in June 1644 just after the third Anglo-Powhatan War, while Governor William Berkeley traveled to England to purchase arms and weaponry to defend the colony from Indian attacks.

Kemp resigned from his positions as secretary and member of the council in 1649 due to declining health.

== Planter ==
In 1636, Kemp purchased the 1200 acre Rich Neck Plantation in James City County, Virginia, in what is now known as Newport News. Rich Neck Plantation was one of the first Virginia plantations to use an enslaved workforce, and Kemp received 100 headrights used for patenting land based on paying laborers' passage.

However, his job required that he live at Jamestown at least during sessions of the Virginia General Assembly, even though the climate was notoriously unhealthy in the summertime. On August 1, 1638, Kemp acquired an urban lot in Jamestown. The next year, Governor Harvey reported to the Privy Council that Jamestown now had "twelve houses and stores" and that Kemp had built the first brick house ("the Fairest ever known in the country") and that others had built frame houses. The assembly then declared that Jamestown should remain the colony's chief town and Governor's residence. Kemp sold his Jamestown house to the next Governor, Sir Francis Wyatt, in 1641.

== Marriage and child ==
Coat of Arms of Richard Kempe

Kemp married Elizabeth Wormeley, the daughter of Judge Christopher Wormeley, who survived him. They had one daughter, Elizabeth, who survived this man but died before marriage or bearing children.

== Death and legacy ==
Kemp wrote his last will and testament on January 4, 1649, instructing his widow to dispose of his house in Jamestown and leave Virginia with their daughter (although she ultimately did neither). Kemp died by October 24, 1650, and his widow remained in the colony, marrying Sir Thomas Lunsford. Kemp is presumed buried at Rich Neck. His widow survived their daughter, as well as her next husband, Thomas Lunsford, and married Major Robert Smith in 1658. Ultimately, the colony's secretary, Thomas Ludlow acquired Kemp's Rich Neck plantation. The Kemp (or Kempe) family's name continued through descendants of his emigrant nephew, Edmund Kemp (a justice of the peace for Lancaster County), particularly Mathew Kemp, his lawyer son who became speaker of the House of Burgesses during the 1679 session after Bacon's Rebellion.
