= Ralph Wormeley Jr. =

Virginia colony tobacco planter and politician (1651–1701)

Member of the Virginia Governor's Council
- In office 1675–1701

Member of the House of Burgesses for Middlesex County
- In office 1669–1675 Serving with Walter Whitaker
- Preceded by: position established
- Succeeded by: John Burnham

Personal details
- Born: 1650 Rosegill plantation, Middlesex County, Colony of Virginia
- Died: 1701 (aged 50–51) Rosegill plantation, Middlesex County, Colony of Virginia
- Relatives: Ralph Wormeley Sr.(father); Ralph Wormeley IV (grandson); Ralph Wormeley V(great grandson)
- Education: Oxford University
- Occupation: planter, politician

Ralph Wormeley Jr. (1651–1701) was a planter and politician who represented Middlesex County in the House of Burgesses before being elevated to the Virginia Governor's Council and serving as the colony's secretary and briefly as its acting governor. He further developed his father's Rosegill plantation, now on the National Register for Historic Places, as well as operated several plantations in adjoining Tidewater counties using enslaved labor.

== Early life and education ==
Born shortly before the death of his planter father, Ralph Wormeley Sr., he was raised by his mother, the former Agatha Eltonhead (who had also survived a previous husband) and his stepfather, Sir Henry Chicheley, the lieutenant governor for the Virginia colony. He was educated privately at home, then sent to England where he matriculated at Oriel College of Oxford University on July 14, 1665.

== Career ==
=== Planter ===
Coat of Arms of Ralph Wormeley

Upon reaching legal age, Wormeley inherited Rosegill plantation. His father had patented more than 3,000 acres in 1649 (based on people for whose emigration to Virginia he had paid) which became Rosegill plantation, and with the boy's stepfather Chicheley acquired about 1000 additional acres by several purchases when their neighbor William Brocas died (Brocas had been a member of the Governor's Council 1637-1652 and married Eleanor Eltonhead and his heir John Jackson lacked manpower to cultivate it). In 1653, Chicheley had seventeen indentured servants working on his and Wormeley land. Nonetheless, after coming of age and Bacon's Rebellion discussed below, Wormeley compelled his guardian Chicheley to account for the income received from (and disbursements made from) his father's estate during his minority. Four decades later, Wormeley would use legal maneuvering and his royal office to cause neighbor George Wortham's patrimony to escheat, and then added those parcels to Rosegill.

Particularly after Bacon's Rebellion, Wormeley purchased enslaved blacks imported from the Caribbean colonies, although each such contract cost significantly more than that for an indentured servant, who would only serve a fixed term (if he survived). In 1681, William Fitzhugh of Stafford County to the northwest wrote Wormeley asking him to select five or six slaves for him from a ship from Barbados expected to reach York County within days. In 1687, Wormeley's labor force was 26 "negro slaves" and 20 "Christians" (presumed white indentured laborers). In 1689, slaves Mingo and Lawrence left their quarters and took food and firearms. They were still raiding Middlesex county plantations in 1694, but after Governor Edmund Andros scolded area planters for their lax patrols, Mingo was caught and executed. The inventory of Wormeley's estate at his death in 1701 showed that he owned 85 slaves, or 20% of the county's Black population.

Meanwhile, based on immigrants for whose entry he had paid, in 1680, Wormeley patented 2,200 acres on the northern side of the Rappahannock River, which he called "Nanzattico", after the people noted by Capt. John Smith in 1608 and whose preserve that had once been. This land lay across the river from the land Wormeley controlled following his marriage to Catherine Lunsford, and bordered Portobago Bay. Wormeley would also patent additional acreage inland. In 1693 he patented 13,500 acres in King and Queen County, but was forced to give it up for failure to develop it.

Also in 1680, Wormeley responded to the desire of other Middlesex County residents by offering some of his land for a town, tobacco port and seat of county government, although others wanted the county courthouse on previously obtained (and platted) land. As work finally began on the courthouse in 1691, another fracas ensued when Wormeley refused to deed the underlying land to the county without receiving in return written acknowledgement to what he considered his entitlements (such as quitrents signifying his baronial role). They refused and sought to condemn the land in what became Urbanna. A stalemate ensued, as Wormeley prevented workmen on the new courthouse, as well as those attempting to build Christopher Robinson's house nearby. The town was eventually built—nearly five decades after his death, when his grandson Ralph Wormeley IV operated Rosegill and exported tobacco through the port.

=== Politician ===
Wormeley (like his father before him) became one of the justices of the peace for the county of his residence, in this case for Middlesex County, which was formed in 1669. During his minority, his stepfather and other Lancaster County landowners with significant property south of the Rappahannock River had lobbied for creation of a new county, based on the difficulty they had in reaching the county courthouse and other government services which were north of the Rappahannock. The royal government at Jamestown had issued an order to split Lancaster County in 1664, but the Lancaster County justices of the peace (who collectively administered the large county) had delayed in implementing that order. In fact, one of Wormeley's first public acts (as an 18 year old not quite of legal age) was joining John Custis in abstaining from the vote of the Lancaster County justices of the peace uniting the parishes north and south of the river, and then stalking from the courtroom. The southsiders then petitioned the General Assembly in Jamestown asking that its order be put in effect, and won separation (by a law creating Middlesex County) six months later. Then, the leading planters of the new county (Chicheley, Wormeley and Robert Smith) met at Rosegill plantation to combine what had been the two small rival parishes in the new County, called Lancaster and Pankatank. They provided for the repair of the latter and the long-delayed building of the former but designated both as "chapels of ease" to a Mother Church to be built in the middle of the county on Wormeley land.

Middlesex County voters elected Wormeley as one of their first representatives in the House of Burgesses in 1669, and he served throughout what later became known as the "Grand Assembly". In 1675, shortly before Bacon's Rebellion discussed below, Wormeley was selected for a seat on the Virginia Governor's Council, on which he would remain for the rest of his life.

During Bacon's Rebellion, mostly white current or former indentured servants first attacked acculturated Native peoples, seeking their land, then seized wealthy landowners and vandalized their properties. Wormeley, his stepfather, his cousin Christopher Wormeley and neighbors (and sometime burgesses) Christopher Robinson, Walter Whitaker and John Burnham would all be taken hostage and parts of their plantations destroyed, before Robert Beverley and his flying squadron pacified the county on behalf of Governor Berkeley. Burnham, Wormeley and Chicheley, and other Middlesex justices of the peace (with Robert Lee and Nicholas Spencer from Westmoreland County, who also were target's of Bacon's rebels in attendance), all sat as a court at Richard Robinson's house to hear Christopher Wormeley's suit against the Baconians on September 7, 1677. In the mid-1680s, Wormeley would host a court session at Rosegill, to decide on the fate of an illegal slave ship that had run aground on the Eastern Shore.

During the administration of Lt. Gov. Francis Howard, 5th Baron Howard of Effingham, (1684-1688), the governor spent most of his time at a "most comfortable" house on Rosegill plantation, since his wife and several servants had died in the insalubrious summertime climate at Jamestown. While on the Governor's Council, Wormeley served as the Secretary of State for the colony, and was able to extract fees for ministerial tasks, including authorizing county clerks. He preferred to be addressed by that title, even though he hired subordinates to execute most bureaucratic tasks, contemporaries called him "the greatest Man in the Government, next to the Governor." When Wormeley eventually became the council's most senior member and its president, he also served as acting Governor, including briefly in late 1693. Some council meetings were held at Rosegill, including when Wormeley was too ill or infirm to travel to Jamestown in 1697 and 1699.

In 1686, Wormeley at Rosegill hosted a French Huguenot, Durand de Dauphine, and also showed him Nanzattico and Portobago plantations. The Frenchman noted that Wormeley had 26 Negro slaves and twenty Christian servants. The following year, he and his cousin Christopher Wormeley were ordered to return the records of the Virginia General Assembly formerly possessed by former clerk and Middlesex planter Robert Beverly to the colony's capital, still Jamestown until shortly before his man's death. Wormeley would also acquire a house at Jamestown, as the law required of men of his position, but would be criticized in his final years for delegating too many of his duties there to a junior clerk.

== Personal life ==
Wormeley married twice. In 1674 he married his cousin (daughter of burgess Christopher Wormeley), the former Catherine Wormeley Lunsford Jenings (d. 1685). Her two previous husbands, Thomas Lunsford and Peter Jenings held high offices in the colony as well as land, including at Nanzattico, which Wormeley re-patented. She bore daughters: Elizabeth (d. 1730; who married John Lomax) and Katherine (b. 1679, who married burgess Gawin Corbin Sr. but had no children before her death). Following Catherine's death, Wormeley married Elizabeth Armistead (1667-1716) daughter of burgess John Armistead, who survived him. Their eldest son, Ralph Wormeley III (d. 1713) was educated in England before returning to Virginia to inherit Rosegill, but died before having children. Thus, this man's estate went to his younger son John Wormeley (1689-1726), whose epitaph stated that he desired no public office. His son (this man's grandson) Ralph Wormeley IV would continue both the family's planter and political traditions. His sister Judith (1695-1716) married burgess Mann Page of "Rosewell" plantation in Gloucester County and Letitia (1692-1770) never married.

== Death and legacy ==
Wormeley prepared his last will and testament in February 22, 1700 and died on December 5 that winter. His widow remarried, to merchant planter William Churchill, who signed a prenuptial agreement disclaiming any interest in her estate and directing the estate go to her sons Ralph and John and daughter Judith. Wormeley also had a large library, whose titles were recorded in the inventory of his estate.

Rosegill plantation remained in the Wormeley family for at least another century, although Ralph Wormeley III deeded Nanzatico plantation to his sister Judith Page, who had already inherited 1500 acres at Manakin in Pamunkey Neck as well as 250 pounds sterling at her marriage. His brother John inherited Rosegill. His son (this man's grandson) Ralph Wormeley IV (1710-1790) rebuilt Rosegill as well as resumed the family's political involvement. Ralph Wormeley IV served in the House of Burgesses and his formerly Loyalist grandson Ralph Wormeley V (1745-1806) served in the Virginia House of Delegates and Virginia Ratifying Convention after the conflict

While Rosegill plantation remains and is on the National Register for Historic Places, the other property (and historical marker) in Middlesex County is actually named to honor his grandson, who built Wormeley Cottage in the town of Urbanna. Ironically, the most prominent people of the Wormeley surname in the last two centuries may have been former Wormeley family slaves. Several were instrumental in educating former slaves, and one established a hotel in the District of Columbia in which the Compromise of 1877 was brokered.
