= Matthew Kemp =

Matthew Kemp may refer to:

- Mathew Kemp (politician), speaker of the Virginia House of Burgesses and councillor
- Matthew Kemp (soccer) (born 1980), Australian footballer
- Matt Kemp (born 1984), American baseball player
- Matt Kemp (racing driver) (born 1999), American stock car racing driver
- Matty Kemp (1907–1999), American actor
