= John Robinson (Virginia politician, born 1705) =

American politician and landowner (1705–1766)

John Robinson, Jr.
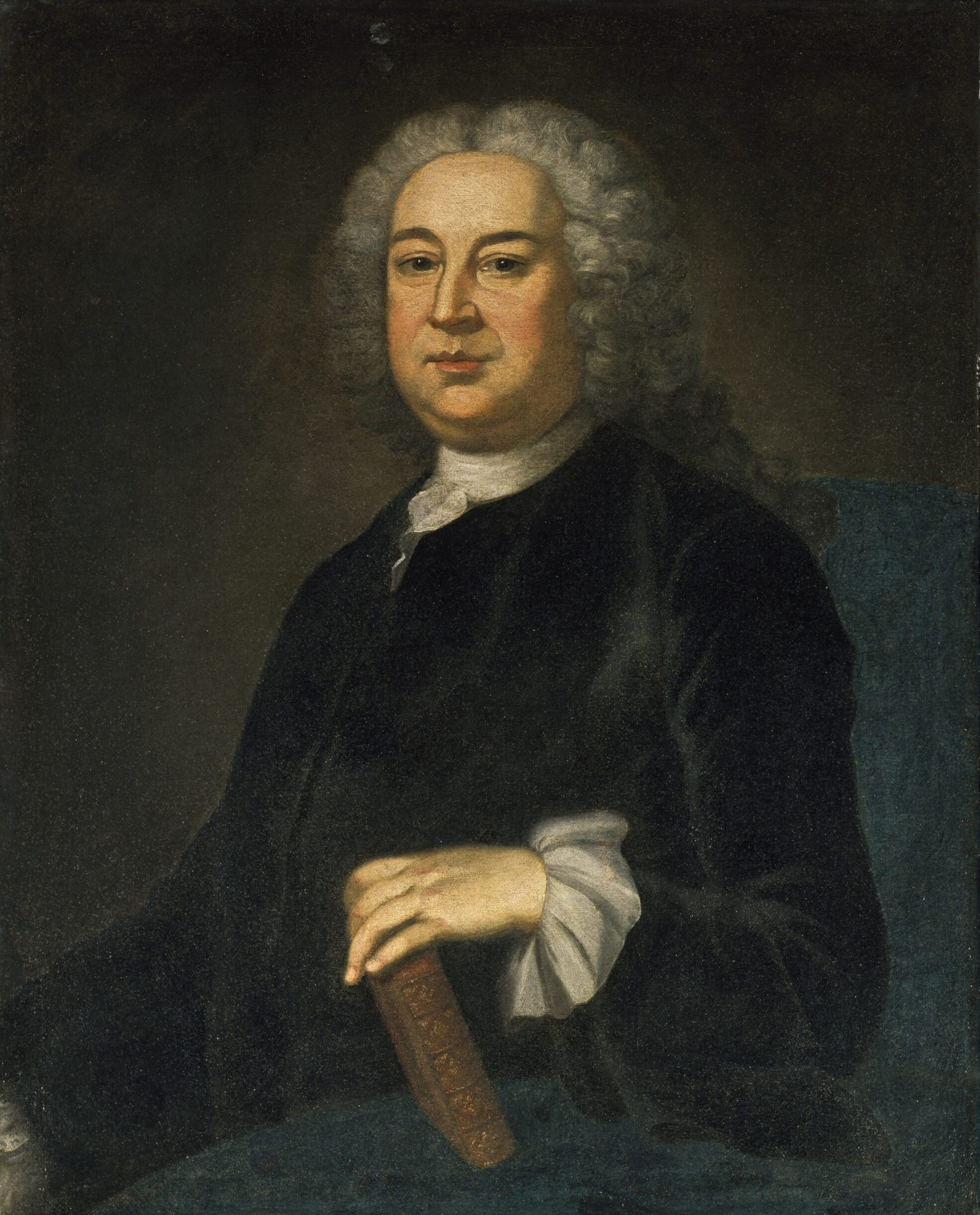
- Portrait by John Wollaston, c. 1755–1758

32nd Speaker of the Virginia House of Burgesses
- In office 1738–1766
- Preceded by: Sir John Randolph
- Succeeded by: Peyton Randolph

Member of the House of Burgesses for King and Queen County
- In office 1728–1766 Serving with George Braxton, Gawin Corbin, Philip Johnson, John Pendleton
- Preceded by: Richard Johnson
- Succeeded by: Richard Tunstall

Personal details
- Born: February 3, 1705 Middlesex County, Virginia
- Died: May 11, 1766 (aged 61) Virginia
- Resting place: Pleasant Hill, King and Queen County, Virginia
- Parent: John Robinson (father)
- Occupation: Lawyer, planter, politician

John Robinson, Jr. (February 3, 1705 – May 11, 1766) was an American politician and landowner in the colony of Virginia. Robinson served as Speaker of the House of Burgesses from 1738 until his death, the longest tenure in the history of that office.

== Early and family life ==
John Robinson was born to the former Catherine Beverley in Middlesex County and her planter husband John Robinson, both of the First Families of Virginia. His father would soon become one of the two members of the House of Burgesses representing Middlesex County, serving alongside his uncle Christopher Robinson. Robinson's father would ultimately serve on the Governor's Council (the upper house of the Virginia General Assembly, the House of Burgesses being the lower house) for 28 years, including a brief term as acting Governor until his unexpected death on August 24, 1749. Another uncle, also Bishop John Robinson was known for his loyalty to the Crown and diplomatic expertise.

Although documentation concerning this man's childhood is limited, he undoubtedly received a private education suitable to his class. He also studied at the College of William & Mary in Williamsburg instead of being sent to England to complete his education, as had his father and eldest brother, Christopher (1703-1738, who died unmarried at Oriel College of Oxford University). His brother William (1709-1792) moved to Spotsylvania County and married Agatha, the daughter of Henry Beverley; his brother Robert(b. 1711) became Captain of the East Indiaman and would be buried at Gravesend in England, and Henry (1718-1758) would marry Mary Waring. His youngest brother Beverley Robinson (1722-1792) would leave Virginia with a company of Virginia soldiers to defend the New York frontier, and married an heiress in that state, but would ultimately become a Loyalist during the American Revolution and moved to and died in Britain. The family also included sisters Mary Robinson (1707-1739) and Catherine Robinson Wagoner (1715-1776).

Robinson married three times, surviving his first two wives, but his only descendants are by his daughter Susan of his final marriage. His first wife was Mary Storey (or "Story"). His second wife was Lucy Moore, daughter of wealthy merchant and planter Augustine Moore and sister of his man's political ally Bernard Moore. Robinson's third wife and widow was Susanna Chiswell, daughter of Col. John Chiswell of Williamsburg (and who remarried to William Griffin in 1771). Their daughter Susan Robinson married Robert Nelson, who bought Malvern Hill plantation and was the brother of Virginia Governor Thomas Nelson.

== Career ==
Like his father, uncle and others of his class, Robinson was a planter who produced tobacco for export to Europe using enslaved labor. Although no records survive as to the date Robinson established his residence in King and Queen County, he resided at Pleasant Hill plantation along the Mattaponi River from 1744 (when he bought that plantation from Richard Johnson, who had inherited it from his uncle, also Richard Johnson, who may have inherited it from his father, Richard Johnson of the colony's Council of State, who died in 1699) until his death in 1766. Robinson's wife, Lucy Moore, was from King William County across the Mattaponi River. Rumors that her father, Col. Augustine Moore, built the mansion for his daughter could not be substantiated. The middle Richard Johnson left 1000 acres on that side of the Mattaponi River to his nephew, which grew to 4000 acres by Robinson's death. Robinson family members resided at Pleasant Hill until the executors of his estate sold it (advertised in April 1770 as 1300 acres of high land and 600 of marsh) by November 1773.

Robinson was first elected to public office in King and Queen County in 1727, but that election (as one of the Burgesses representing the area part-time during legislative session) was overturned following allegations of "illegal proceedings," although the House of Burgesses allowed Robinson to assume his seat as one of burgesses representing King and Queen County in 1730. Moreover in 1732, Robinson succeeded Chesley Corbin Thacker as clerk of the King and Queen county court. Continuing the tradition of both sides of his family, Robinson would then continually win re-election as one of the burgesses representing King and Queen County for nearly three decades, until his death. During this long tenure, Robinson demonstrated mastery of the rules of parliamentary procedure.

Robinson also served as the colony's treasurer from 1738 until his death. When the previous treasurer, John Holloway, had resigned, the accounts were found in disorder, with £1,850 in arrears, possibly from amounts not forwarded by county sheriffs, though Holloway had also commingled state and personal funds. After Robinson died, burgesses discovered that he failed to burn redeemed notes, but instead used them to make personal loans exceeding £100,000 from the treasury to his friends. Auditors also discovered Robinson too failed to deposit funds received by local sheriffs into the Treasury. The resulting scandal reverberated in Virginia politics for years. Despite the sale of Mount Pleasant, and the next plantation upstream on the Mattaponi River, "Clifton", and a tobacco warehouse, Robinson's estate was not settled until decades after the end of the American Revolution.

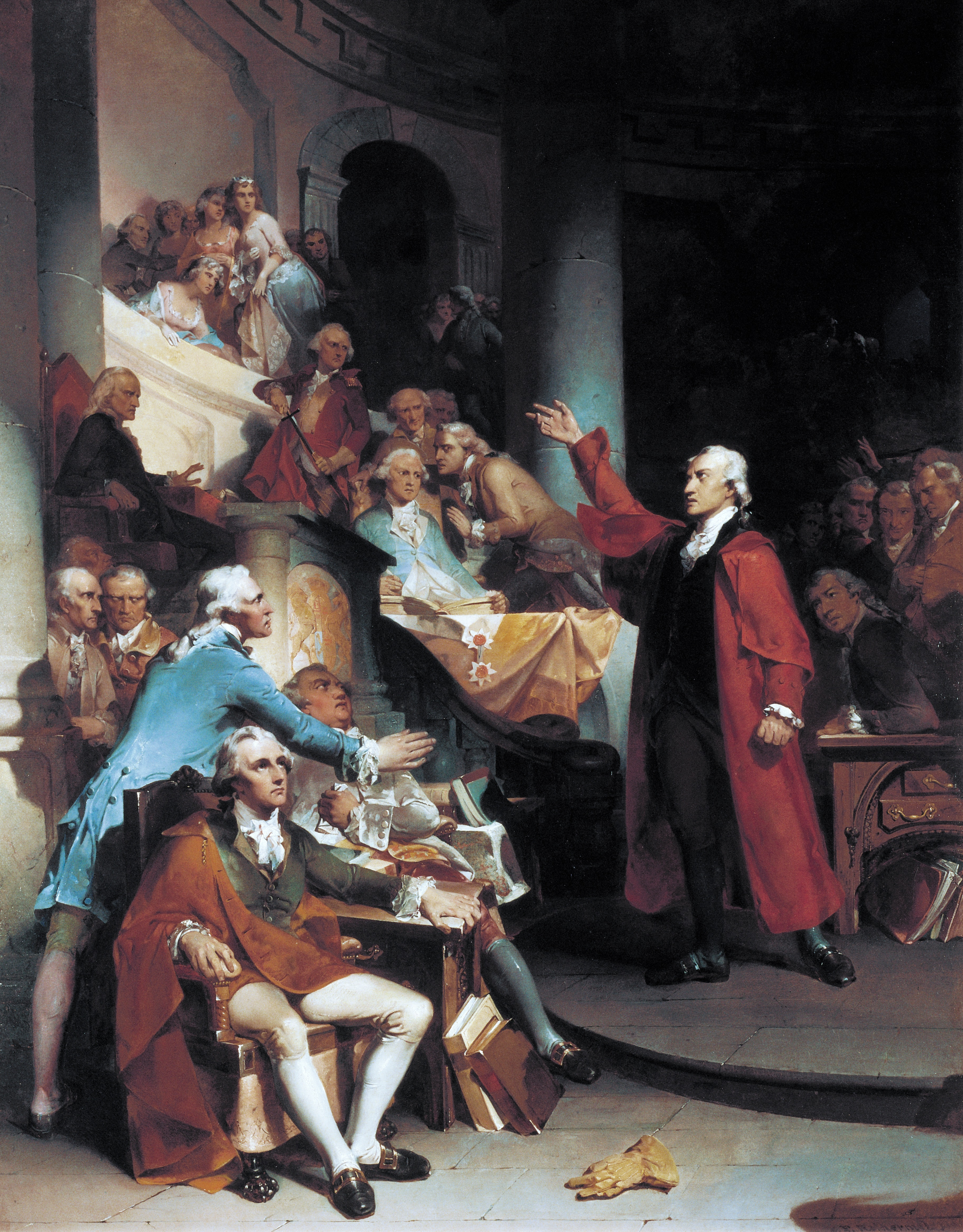
1851 painting of Patrick Henry's speech in favor of the Virginia Resolves; Robinson is shown at left watching Henry

While John Robinson was Speaker of the House of Burgesses, colonial relations with Britain deteriorated after the French and Indian War, as the British government attempted to recoup costs incurred defending the colonies. Following news of the Stamp Act 1765's passage, some burgesses proposed the Virginia Resolves against those fiscal measures. After Patrick Henry gave a speech favoring the resolution on May 29, in which he seemingly called for the killing of George III, Robinson and others shouted: "Treason! Treason!" Henry replied: "If this be treason, make the most of it!"

== Positions held in the Virginia Colony ==
- Delegate, Virginia House of Burgesses (1728–1738)
- Speaker of Virginia House of Burgesses (1738–1766)
- Treasurer, Virginia Colony (1738–1766)

== Death and legacy ==
Following Robinson's death at Pleasant Hill on the night of May 10/11 (possibly from an attack of kidney stones), he was buried behind the house. A historical marker noting his life and burial was placed in what had become known as the "Henry graveyard" (after subsequent owners at Pleasant Hill) by Virginia's Department of History and Conservation in 1946. George Washington had bought Pleasant Hill from Robinson's executors for his then-underage stepson John Parke Custis in 1773, and Custis advertised it in the Virginia Gazette before his death in November 1781. James Henry (who resigned from the Virginia House of Delegates to become judge of the Admiralty Court) acquired it by 1782, when he became a vestryman of Stratton Major parish and began paying taxes on 1900 acres of land, and Pleasant Hill passed to heirs of Samuel Henry who divided it in 1838, with Henry family members continuing to own at least part until 1899.

Meanwhile, Robinson's administrators found the late Speaker responsible for very large debts, and also located (mostly uncollectible) promissory notes from a number of fellow planters who were his allies in the House of Burgesses. A committee established to examine the treasury accounts found an arrearage of £100,761. Robert Carter Nicholas, his successor as treasurer, criticized Robinson by name in the Virginia Gazette, and as a result of the ensuing scandal, the two offices were not combined again. Peyton Randolph succeeded Robinson as Speaker, but chose not to administer Robinson's estate. Although three lawyers were appointed as the estate's administrators, Peter Randolph soon died, Peter Lyons chose to not participate actively, so Robinson's former ally Edmund Pendleton performed most of the work trying to both repay creditors and limit the scandal tarring Robinson's former beneficiaries.
