= Ralph Wormeley (Virginia politician) =

American planter and politician (1715–1789)

Ralph Wormeley IV
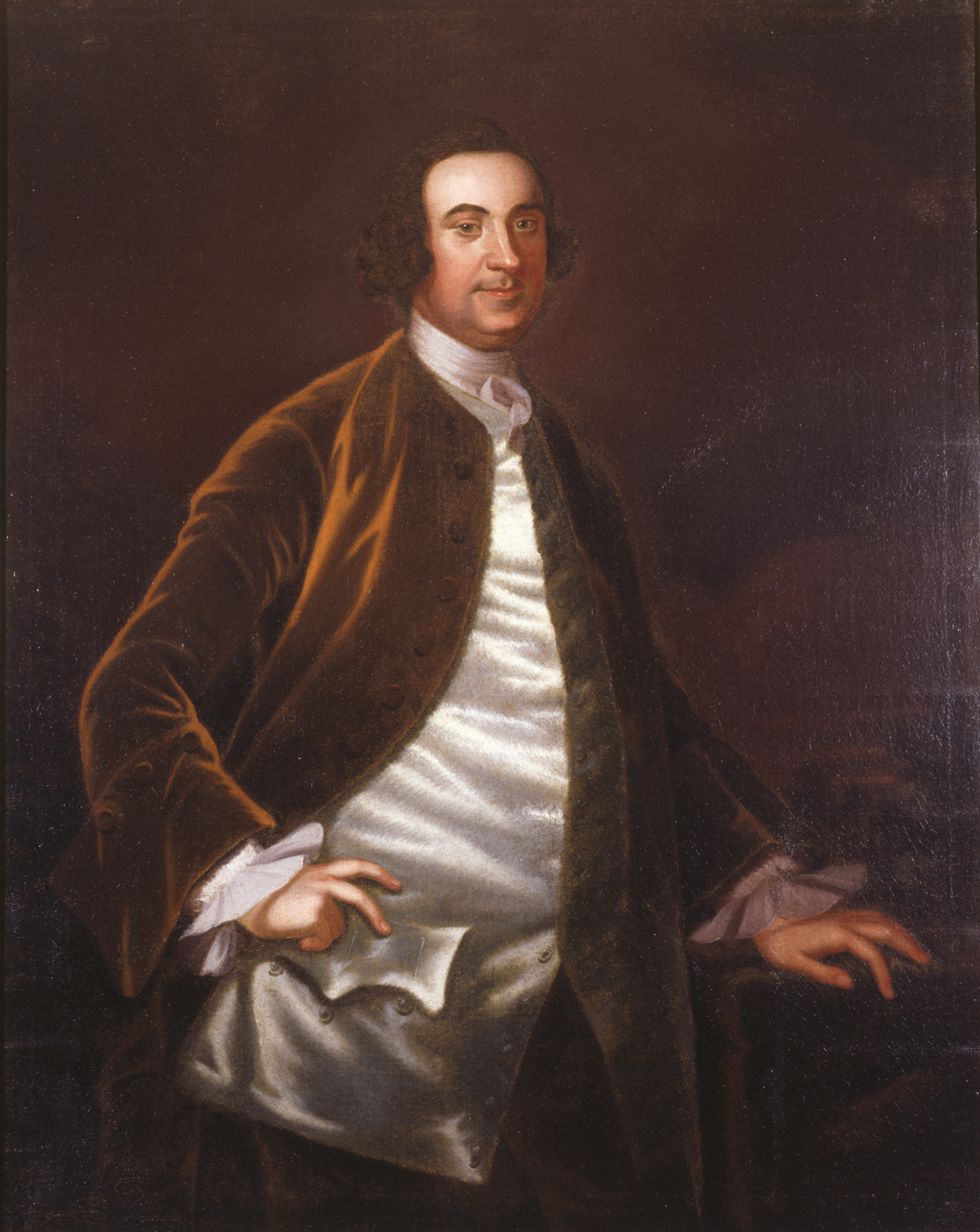
- Portrait by John Wollaston, c. 1755–1758

Member of the Virginia Governor's Council
- In office 1771–1775

Member of the House of Burgesses for Middlesex County
- In office 1742–1764 Serving with Gawin Corbin, Philip Grymes, Richard Corbin, Christopher Robinson, Thomas Price
- Preceded by: Edmund Berkeley
- Succeeded by: Gawin Corbin

Personal details
- Born: October 5, 1715
- Died: August 19, 1790 (aged 74) Rosegill plantation, Middlesex County, Virginia
- Occupation: planter, politician, slaver

Ralph Wormeley (October 5, 1715 – 1789) was an American planter and politician who represented Middlesex County in the House of Burgesses. He and his son also operated Rosegill plantation, now on the National Register for Historic Places, using enslaved labor. He was the grandson of Ralph Wormeley.

== Early life and education ==
The elder of two sons born to Elizabeth (d. 1761), the wife of prominent but deliberately non-officeholding planter John Wormeley (1689–1726), he would have a younger brother (John Wormeley who married Ann Tayloe and only had a daughter Elizabeth). The family also included eight sisters, of whom half died as infants and are not named her. However, the four surviving sisters married into the First Families of Virginia: Elizabeth (1713–1740) married Col. Landon Carter of Sabine Hall in Richmond County, Judith (1714–1751) married George Lee of Mt. Pleasant in Westmoreland County, Sarah(1717-after 1752) married Christopher Robinson of Hewick in Middlesex County; and Agatha (b. 1721) married Beverley Randolph of Gloucester County.

He received a private education and returned from England upon his father's death in 1726.

== Career ==
This Ralph Wormeley was born at and inherited Rosegill plantation in Middlesex County. Although his father's 1725 will is lost, an Act of the Virginia General Assembly in November 1728 acknowledged that John Wormeley died with great debts, although he also held valuable land in Middlesex, Gloucester, King William and York Counties, as well as a thousand-acre parcel in Caroline County and a reversionary interest in 2000 acres in King George County. Furthermore, it provided half to his widow during her life, as well as for the education of this man and for his brother John until they turned 21 years old. Eventually, all the debts were paid from the profits of the estate and sale of some lands. Ralph Wormeley IV also administered his mother's will in 1761, which included a bequest of lands in York and King and Queen counties to his brother John Wormeley Jr.

Middlesex County voters elected him to the House of Burgesses in 1742, but he did not was not allowed to take his seat because he had accepted "an office for profit", but voters re-elected him nonetheless. He represented Middlesex County in the House of Burgesses from 1742 until October 1764, when the same rationale was given, but this time Gawin Corbin was elected to replace him. The family biographer explains that the latter appointment was as Comptroller of the Port of the Rappahannock River, which the son carried with him when returning from his British education, but was not allowed to hold, since the absence of a "junior" annotation meant the father (this man) was the actual appointee. Governor Fauquier in 1766 wrote the Board of Trade concerning the matter, indicating this man's desire to relinquish the office in favor of his son, who was a schoolmate of prominent Whig Charles James Fox, who had influenced Lord Grenville concerning the appointment

During the American Revolutionary War, local patriots presumed he sided with Britain, although he remained in Middlesex County. After patriots intercepted a letter from his namesake son to John R. Grymes on April 4, 1776, Virginia authorities required that son to post a bond and confined him to this man's western Virginia lands, despite his protests. Two other sons clearly took up arms for Britain. Nonetheless, in 1781 a British privateer looted Rosegill and other plantations, prompting both Ralph Wormeleys to petition for compensation, particularly since when the more than 30 slaves were recovered, they had smallpox. In the 1787 Virginia tax census, two white adult males lived on the Middlesex county property, as did 54 adult slaves, 35 teenaged slaves, 13 horses including a stud horse, and 226 cattle. The "non-tithable" annotation can indicate the owner as an office-holder, and the son was a legislator at the time.

== Personal life ==
Sarah, the daughter of Edmund Berkeley of "Barn Elms" plantation in Middlesex County married this Ralph Wormeley on November 4, 1736. They had a daughter Elizabeth (b. Sept. 3, 1737), who married Dudley Digges of York County but who predeceased her father. After his first wife died, the widower Wormeley married Jane Bowles, the daughter of James Bowles of Maryland, who bore three sons and two daughters who reached adulthood. While an old biographical sketch argues that Ralph Wormeley V was seated on the Virginia Governor's Council before the American Revolutionary War instead of this man, usually such appointments went to seasoned men such as this grandee who had already served two decades as burgess. However, Governor Fauquier's correspondence supports the mistake, and Ralph Wormeley V received explicit direction from a Virginia Revolutionary Convention in 1776 to remain in remote Frederick County, Virginia and had to post bond during the conflict, and clearly this man could not have served terms in the Virginia House of Delegates after his death. Clearly, two other sons (Ralph V's brothers) James Wormeley and John Wormeley fought for the British in the Revolutionary War. However, James ultimately resettled in England and accepted a British army officer's commission, whereas John settled in the Shenandoah Valley. The 1787 Virginia tax census showed him as a nonresident, who owned 27 adult slaves, 17 teenage slaves, 21 horses and 56 cattle.

== Death and legacy ==
This Ralph Wormeley wrote a will on April 7, 1787, which was admitted to probate in Middlesex County on May 3, 1789, although a family prayer book lists his death date as August 19, 1790. His will provided for the accommodation of his widow at Rosegill, which would come fully into the possession of his son Ralph Wormeley V after her death. The will also directed the sale of all his lands in Berkeley County and some in King William County, and noted that he had already given his son James his inheritance, so son Ralph received all land in Middlesex County and the remaining land in King William County. His son John Wormeley received 2680 acres of land in Frederick County, as well as personal property therein. Both John and James fought as Loyalists during the American Revolutionary War. Although John Wormeley was permitted to return to Cool Spring in Frederick County, James Wormeley returned to England in the 1790s and regained a commission in his old regiment, although some of his children remained in Virginia.
