= Virginia Resolves =

Series of resolutions passed by the Virginia House of Burgesses

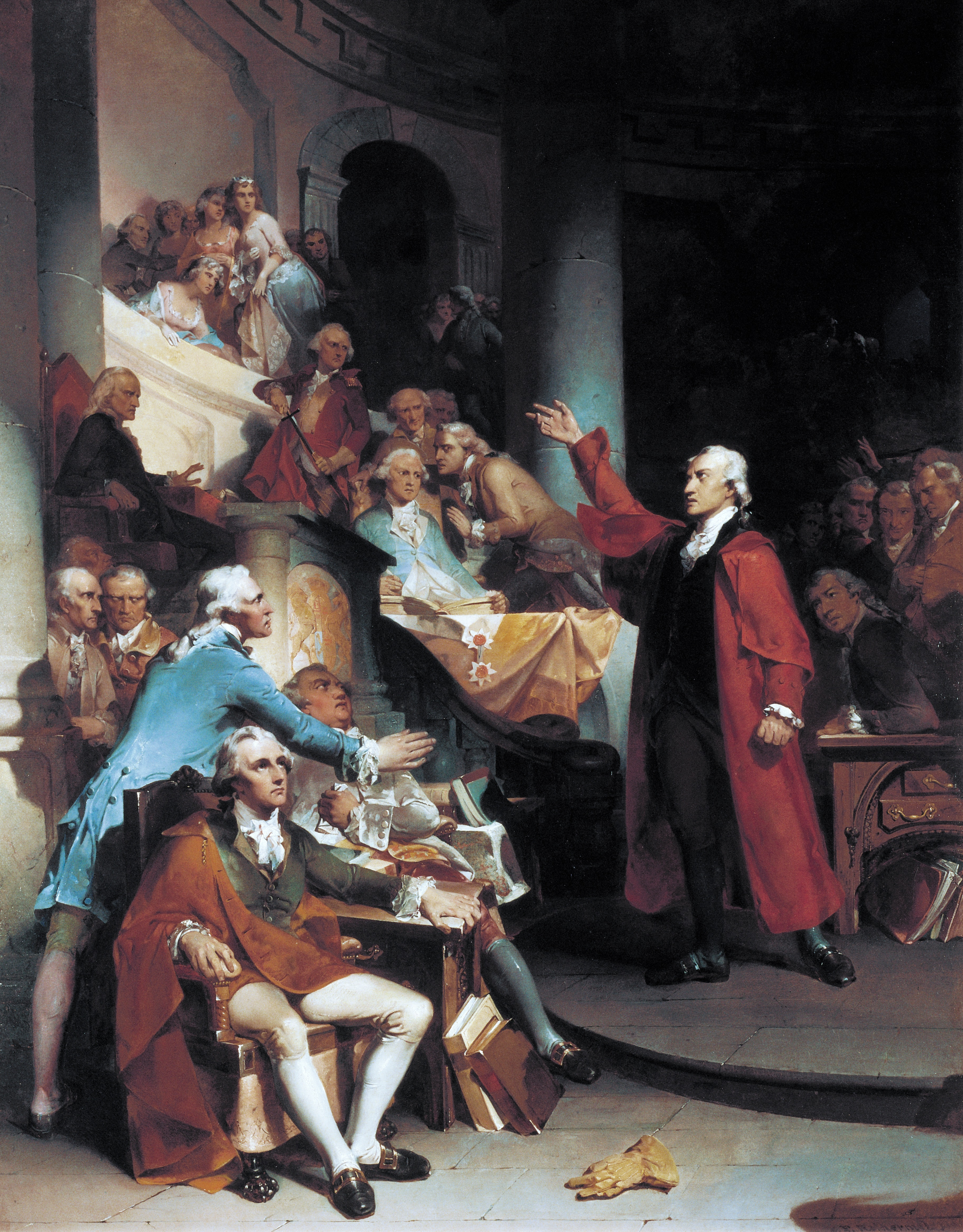
Patrick Henry's speech on the Virginia Resolves in the House of Burgesses on May 29, 1765

The Virginia Resolves were a series of resolutions passed on May 29, 1765, by the Virginia House of Burgesses in response to the Stamp Act 1765, which had imposed a tax on the British colonies in North America requiring that material be printed on paper made in London which carried an embossed revenue stamp. The act had been passed by the Parliament of Great Britain to help pay off some of its debt from its various wars, including the French and Indian War fought in part to protect the American colonies.

The resolves, primarily authored by Patrick Henry, stated that in accordance with long established British law, Virginia was subject to taxation only by a parliamentary assembly to which Virginians themselves elected representatives. Since no colonial representatives were elected to Parliament, the only assembly legally allowed to raise taxes would be the Virginia General Assembly.

Similarly angered, legislatures in nine other colonies later sent delegates to a Stamp Act Congress in New York (October 9–25, 1765) to devise a unified protest against the tax. Virginia was not represented at the meeting as the General Assembly had been earlier dissolved by Lieutenant Governor Francis Fauquier, preventing them from appointing delegates.

== Origin ==
The intent of the British Parliament to impose new taxes upon the colonies was well-known, and members of Virginia's House of Burgesses had even retained an agent in London to lobby against such legislation on their behalf. However, these efforts fell on deaf ears, and about May 28, 1765, a ship docked near Williamsburg, Virginia carrying the text of the recently passed Stamp Act, which itemized fifty-five new direct taxes.

On May 29, 1765, Patrick Henry made one of his famous speeches before the House of Burgesses to encourage the passage of the resolutions. Henry said "Caesar had his Brutus, Charles I his Cromwell, and George III... (Henry was interrupted by cries from the opposition)... may profit by their example. If this be treason, make the most of it." When Patrick Henry paused after the vibrant portion of the speech, Speaker John Robinson stood and shouted, "Treason! Treason!". Patrick Henry at this point issued a semi-apology.

Peyton Randolph later told his young cousin Thomas Jefferson who was standing in the doorways of the House quite frequently. "By God, I would have given 500 guineas for a single vote".

The Burgesses generally voted along geographic lines with eastern Virginians opposing the resolves and central Virginians supporting them. Patrick Henry left Williamsburg that night fearing the powerful members of the House would harass him with a warrant.

The next day, with Patrick Henry gone and most conservative assembly members back in session, the assembly again set a vote with conservatives trying to have the Resolves struck from the record. However Henry's supporters managed to preserve the first four resolutions with only the more radical 5th Resolution being struck.

== Impact ==
Governor Fauquier initially attempted to stifle the spread of the Resolves, imposing on the printer of the Virginia Gazette not to publish their particulars, despite it being the official government gazette which would ordinarily disseminate acts of the General Assembly to the public. However, this suppression backfired, as the complete text of all seven proposed resolutions was transmitted privately alongside commercial correspondence, ultimately being published in its entirety in the Newport Mercury on June 24. Lacking the context of the official records, readers across the colonies assumed that all seven resolutions had been approved together by the assembly, including those most inflammatory in nature.

A direct result of the publishing of the Virginia Resolves was a growing public anger over the Stamp Act, and according to several contemporary sources the Resolves were responsible for inciting the Stamp Act Riots. Governor Thomas Hutchinson of Massachusetts stated that "nothing extravagant appeared in the papers till an account was received of the Virginia Resolves." Later Edmund Burke linked the resolves with the beginning of the opposition to the Stamp Act that would contribute to the American Revolution.

== Text of the Virginia Resolves ==
The text of the Virginia Resolves, as recorded in the proceedings of the House of Burgesses for May 29, 1765:

Resolved, that the first adventurers and settlers of His Majesty's colony and dominion of Virginia brought with them and transmitted to their posterity, and all other His Majesty's subjects, since inhabiting in this His Majesty's said colony, all the liberties, privileges, franchises, and immunities that have at any time been held, enjoyed, and possessed by the people of Great Britain.

Resolved, that by two royal charters, granted by King James I, the colonists aforesaid are declared entitled to all liberties, privileges, and immunities of denizens and natural subjects to all intents and purposes as if they had been abiding and born within the Realm of England.

Resolved, that the taxation of the people by themselves, or by persons chosen by themselves to represent them, who can only know what taxes the people are able to bear, or the easiest method of raising them, and must themselves be affected by every tax laid on the people, is the only security against a burdensome taxation, and the distinguishing characteristic of British freedom, without which the ancient constitution cannot exist.

Resolved, that His Majesty's liege people of this his most ancient and loyal colony have without interruption enjoyed the inestimable right of being governed by such laws, respecting their internal policy and taxation, as are derived from their own consent, with the approbation of their sovereign, or his substitute; and that the same has never been forfeited or yielded up, but has been constantly recognized by the kings and people of Great Britain.

A fifth resolve was originally adopted with the others on May 29, but was struck from the record the next day in a separate vote by the assembly:

Resolved, therefore, that the General Assembly of this Colony have the only and exclusive Right and Power to lay Taxes and Impositions upon the inhabitants of this Colony and that every Attempt to vest such Power in any person or persons whatsoever other than the General Assembly aforesaid has a manifest Tendency to destroy British as well as American Freedom.

Two further resolves were not brought to a vote in the assembly due to their more extreme nature rendering them unlikely to be adopted. However, they were included in early newspaper reports alongside the official resolves, linking them in popular opinion:

Resolved, that his Majesty's liege people, the inhabitants of this colony, are not bound to yield obedience to any law or ordinance whatever, designed to impose any taxation whatsoever upon them, other than the laws or ordinances of the General Assembly aforesaid.

Resolved, that any who shall, by speaking or writing, assert or maintain that any person or persons, other than the General Assembly of this colony, have any right or power to impose or lay any taxation on the people here, shall be deemed an enemy to his Majesty's colony.

== See also ==
- No taxation without representation
- Social contract

== Bibliography ==
- Anderson, Fred (2001). Crucible of War. New York, NY: Vintage Books. ISBN 0-375-70636-4.
- Beatty, Joshua (2014). "The Fatal Year": Slavery, Violence, And The Stamp Act Of 1765 (PhD dissertation). William & Mary. doi:10.21220/S2-96GH-3Y07.
- Kukla, Jon (2017). Patrick Henry: Champion of Liberty. New York, NY: Simon and Schuster. ISBN 978-1-4391-9081-4.
