= Thomas Lunsford =

Exiled Cavalier (1610–1653)

Sir Thomas Lunsford
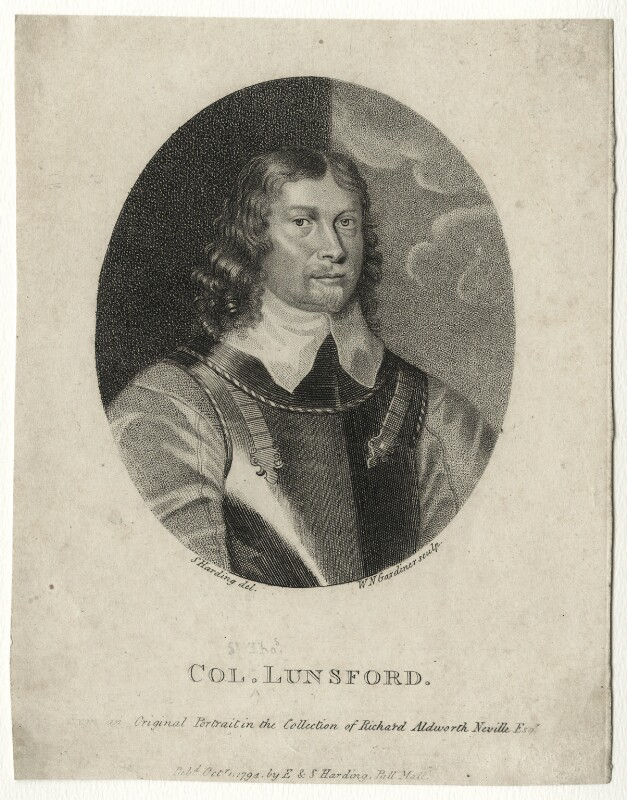
- 1794 portrait

Member of the Virginia Governor's Council

Lieutenant of the Tower of London
- In office 1649-1651

Personal details
- Born: c. 1610 Wilegh, Sussex, England
- Died: c. 1653 near Williamsburg, Virginia
- Resting place: Rich Neck, Virginia
- Spouse(s): Anne Hudson (d. 1638); Katherine Neville(d. 1649); Elizabeth Wormeley Kemp
- Children: 4
- Parents: Thomas Lunsford, Sr., Gentleman (father); Katherine Lunsford (mother)

Sir Thomas Lunsford (c. 1610 – c. 1653) was a Royalist colonel in the English Civil War who in 1649 was exiled to the Virginia Colony, where he held offices, acquired land and died.

== Early and family life ==
Lunsford was son of Thomas Lunsford of Wilegh, Sussex. His mother, Katherine, was daughter of Thomas Fludd, treasurer of war to Queen Elizabeth, and sister of Robert Fludd the Rosicrucian. Lunsford was the third son and heir, with a twin, Herbert. His brothers Herbert and Henry were also Royalist officers. Henry was killed in July 1643 during the assault on Bristol.

=== Early career and French exile ===
Lunsford had a wild temperament from an early age. On 27 June 1632, he was charged with killing deer on the grounds of his relative, Sir Thomas Pelham. In August 1633, Lunsford tried to murder Pelham by firing upon him from the doorway of a church. He was indicted, and sent on 16 August to Newgate Prison. He escaped in October 1634, although "so lame that he can only go in a coach", and fled to the continent. He served in the French army and was made colonel of a foot regiment. He was tried in absentia in the Star Chamber in June 1637, fined £8,000, and outlawed for failing to appear before the court.

=== Personal life ===
Lunsford married three times. He and his first wife, Anne Hudson (d. 1638), had one son who died in infancy. In 1640, he married Katherine (d. 1649), daughter of Sir Henry Neville; with whom he had three daughters and one son, William Lunsford ESQ. His third wife was Elizabeth, the daughter of Virginia emigrant Christopher Wormeley and granddaughter of Henry Wormeley of Riccall, Yorkshire, and the widow of Richard Kemp, member of the Governor's Council and former colonial secretary; with whom he had one daughter.

== Royalist during the English Civil War ==
In 1639, Lunsford returned to England, received a pardon from King Charles I, and joined the king's army against the Scots. During the Scottish expedition the following year, Lunsford commanded a regiment raised from the Somerset Trained Bands. His regiment fought at the Battle of Newburn on 28 August 1640, being routed after defending the crossing against Scottish cavalry and artillery.

=== Royalist officer ===
On 22 December 1641, the king appointed Lunsford as Lieutenant of the Tower of London. The next day, the common council of London presented a petition to the House of Commons against his appointment. Bowing to pressure, the king removed Lunsford from the post on 26 December. The following day, Lunsford was called before the Commons for examination. On leaving the house, he was engaged in a free-for-all in Westminster Hall. Roundhead propagandists painted Lunsford with a reputation for sadism, brutality, and cannibalism. This episode was seen as contributing to the king's growing unpopularity and ultimate demise.

The king knighted Lunsford on 28 December and appointed him commander of an unofficial royal guard at the Palace of Whitehall. On 4 January 1642, Sir Thomas accompanied the king on his ill-fated attempt to arrest Five Members of the House of Commons. On 13 January, Lunsford was arrested as a traitor for allegedly joining Lord Digby in a plot to capture the magazine at Kingston upon Thames. However, contemporary accounts contradict one another, leaving in doubt whether the plot was real or imagined. Regardless, Lunsford was released in June, and participated in several military engagements over the next few months. Captured at the Battle of Edgehill in October 1642, he was charged with treason and imprisoned in Warwick Castle, from which he was released in May 1644.

=== Denouement ===
Sir Thomas was captured again at the Siege of Hereford in December 1645. He remained a prisoner until 1648. On 7 August 1649, he was granted permission to emigrate to Virginia with his wife and family,

== Exile in Virginia and death ==
Lunsford and his daughters arrived in Virginia in 1649. Lunsford was named to the Council of State in 1650 and took office in 1651. Shortly after his arrival in the colony, Lunsford patented more than 3,400 acres bordering Portobago Bay on the Rappahannock River opposite to the Native American settlement called Nanzattico, which was home to the Portobago and Nanzattico Native Americans and that later became part of Caroline County. Normally, such patents were based on the number of people (including himself) for whose emigration to Virginia the patentee had paid, and he was also required to improve and cultivate the land. Lunsford also owned land near Potomac Creek in Northumberland County. Upon the death of the colony's secretary, Richard Kemp, Lunsford married Kemp's widow, the former Elizabeth Wormeley, and resided at Kemp's former Rich Neck Plantation. Lunsford held the rank of lieutenant-general in the Virginia militia. Accounts place his death either c. 1653 or c. 1656.

== Legacy ==
Although three of Lunsford's daughters (Elizabeth, Phillippa and Mary) returned to England and Sir John Thorogood was named as their guardian, his daughter Catherine remained in Virginia. In 1670, Catherine married Peter Jennings, the colony's attorney general, and also claimed her late father's land on Portobago Bay. In 1670, the Portobago Bay land was part of a reservation assigned to the Portobago and Nanzattico tribespeople, but Catherine Wormeley was allowed to succeed to the patent provided the native peoples were not disturbed. After Jening's death, Catherine married Ralph Wormeley Jr. who in 1680 patented the former Nanzattico land.

Lunsford was portrayed by Patrick Holt in the 1970 film Cromwell.

== Attribution ==
This article incorporates text from a publication now in the public domain: Shaw, William Arthur (1893). "Lunsford, Thomas". In Lee, Sidney (ed.). Dictionary of National Biography. Vol. 34. London: Smith, Elder & Co.
