= Ralph Wormeley Sr. =

Virginia colony tobacco planter and politician

Captain Ralph Wormeley Senior

Member of the Virginia Governor's Council
- In office 1650–1651

Member of the House of Burgesses for York County
- In office 1649–1650 Serving with Rowland Burnham
- Preceded by: Richard Lee I
- Succeeded by: Augustine Warner

Personal details
- Born: ca. 1620 England
- Died: 1651 Rosegill plantation, Middlesex County, Colony of Virginia
- Spouse: Agatha Eltonhead
- Children: Ralph Wormeley Jr. (son)
- Occupation: planter, politician

Ralph Wormeley (ca. 1620-1651) emigrated to the Virginia colony, where he became a planter and politician who represented York County in the House of Burgesses and developed Rosegill plantation in what became Middlesex County after his death.

== Early life and education ==
Born in England, Wormeley could trace his ancestry to Sir John de Wormeley of Hatfield in Yorkshire. His elder brother Christopher Wormeley was among the British who captured Tortuga Island from the French, and had served as that colony's acting governor before its capture by the Spanish, after which he moved to Virginia, where he died.

== Career ==
Wormeley settled in York County, Virginia around 1636, and became a justice of the peace (although he may have left and returned as did his brother, the justices jointly administering counties in that era). In 1645 or 1649 Wormeley patented 3200 acres along the southern side of the Rappahannock River east of Rosegill Creek (also known as Nimcock Creek, encompassing both the old and new Nimcock native American towns), then in Lancaster County but which in 1669 became Middlesex County. The patent required that Wormeley construct a house and otherwise improve the land. That house and some acreage directly across the creek became the core of Rosegill plantation, the family home for more than a century. Wormeley also patented 3,500 acres on Mobjack Bay (part of which later became Yorktown), as well as acquired part of a 1,645 acre parcel in York County from the executors of his brother Christopher Wormeley I. In the contract before his marriage discussed below, Wormeley gave his bride a 500 acre plantation in York County that he bought from Jeffrey Power.

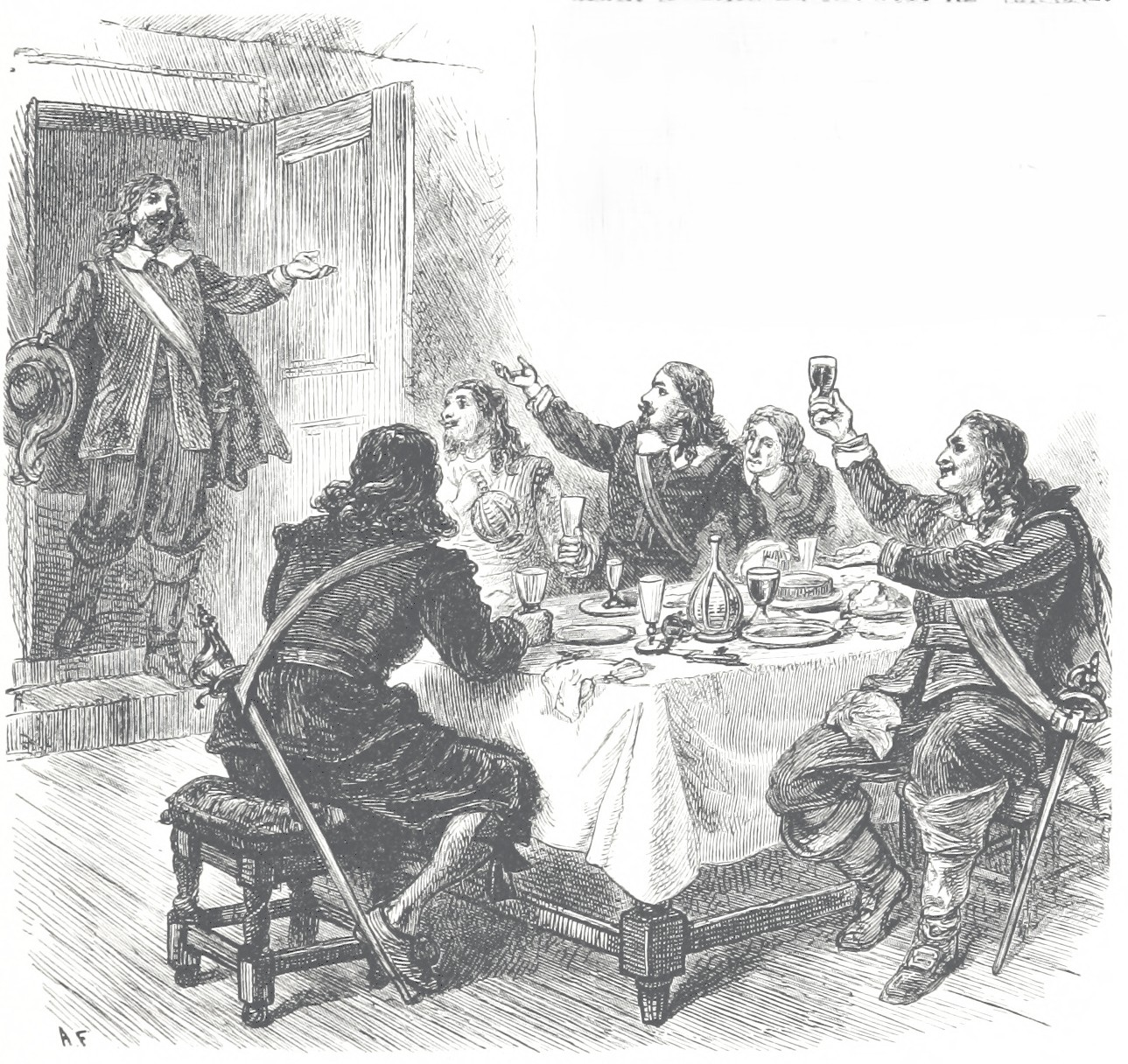
Cavaliers greeting Henry Norwood at Wormeley's house

In 1647 Wormeley was (again) named a justice of the peace for York County, and by 1648 he also led part of its militia with the rank of captain. Henry Norwood, a fleeing Cavalier (supporter of King Charles, defeated by Oliver Cromwell's forces in the English Civil War), visited his home on Wormeley Creek near Yorktown in 1649, and named other guests at a party there as Sir Thomas Lunsford, Sir Philip Honywood (Honeywood), Sir Henry Chicheley (the colony's deputy governor and who would marry his widow) and a Colonel John Hammond. Also in 1649, York County voters elected Wormeley as one of their representatives in the House of Burgesses. The following year, the exiled King Charles at Breda in the Netherlands signed a paper appointing Wormeley to the Virginia Governor's Council (a/k/a the Council of State, or the upper house of the Virginia General Assembly).

== Personal life ==
Wormeley married the former Agatha Eltonhead, daughter of Richard Eltonhead of Eltonhead, Lancaster County, England, who had been widowed by the death of her first husband, Luke Stubbins of Northampton County, Virginia. One of Eltonhead's sons moved to Maryland (and was executed after he attempted to extend religious strife in that colony), and three other daughters all married into prominent Middlesex County families: Eleanor married William Brocas, Alice married Rowland Burnham and Martha married Edwin Connoway. Wormeley fathered two boys, of whom the younger (William Wormeley) died as a child, but Ralph Wormeley Jr. would become the family's most powerful member, after being raised by his step-father Sir Henry Chicheley as discussed below.

== Death and legacy ==
Wormeley died in 1651. His widow remarried, to Sir Henry Chicheley, the colony's lieutenant governor, who took up residence at Rosegill as well as raised Ralph Wormeley Jr.
