= William Travers (Virginia politician) =

17th Speaker of the Virginia House of Burgesses
- In office October 10, 1677 to November 10, 1677
- Preceded by: Augustine Warner Jr.
- Succeeded by: Mathew Kemp

Personal details
- Born: circa 1630
- Died: 1677/8 Virginia
- Spouse: Rebecca
- Relations: Raleigh Travers (brother)
- Children: Samuel, William Jr., Raleigh II, John
- Occupation: lawyer, real estate investor, politician

Military service
- Branch/service: Virginia militia
- Rank: Colonel

Col. William Travers (c. 1630 – 1679) was a lawyer, early settler and politician of Colonial Virginia.

== Early life ==
William Travers was born in England around 1630. His brother Raleigh Travers emigrated to Virginia by 1651 or 1652, the first session of many sessions over two decades in which he represented Lancaster County in the House of Burgesses. William Travers became a justice of the peace for Lancaster County by 1657 (the justices jointly administering the county in that era, in addition to judicial duties).

== Career in Virginia ==
The first record of William Travers in the Colony dates from 1656, when he signed as witness to a will. He received 500 acres of land on Morattico Creek from in 1661. By 1665, this Travers acquired land on the south side of the Rappahannock River and in 1668 he acquired 2,650 acres on its north bank. Also, in 1679 he patented 780 acres in Stafford County further upstream on the Rappahannock.

As Captain, with Colonel John Washington, John Lee, William Mosely, and Robert Beverley, Travers was appointed to settle the boundary between Northumberland and Westmoreland counties. In 1675, as Colonel for Lancaster County, the Governor's Council commissioned him to employ Native Americans to defend the Colony.

Fellow burgesses elected William Travers as Speaker of the House of Burgesses in 1676, and limited records cannot confirm which county he represented. Much of Lancaster County and Northumberland County was in the Northern Neck Proprietary created by royal decree and which required quitrents to the royal favorite as well as taxes which remained in the colony, which thus created considerable controversy in the area of his and his brother's landholdings. His role in Bacon's Rebellion is unclear, for on May 13, 1676 he wrote his British superiors complaining that Governor Berkeley, who had gone to the falls of the James River, was misinformed about the Susquehannock and Portotobaco tribes. In February 1677, the general assembly paid Travers 2,325 pounds of tobacco, though it is unclear whether it was for military service during Bacon's Rebellion or for his services as lawyer and auditor. Thus, one historian believed him probably aligned with the previous Speaker, Augustine Warner Jr. (who owned land in many counties but could no longer serve in the lower house representing Gloucester County after his elevation to the Governor's Council), and not attracted to Bacon's cause.

== Personal life ==
He married Rebecca (Brookes?), and died when their sons Samuel, William Travers II and Raleigh Travers II were all underage. When Rebecca remarried, her new husband, merchant John Rice, defended the estate and handled the property for the young men. Their firstborn son (and primary heir) Samuel married Frances Allerton, the daughter of burgess Col. Isaac Allerton Jr. and granddaughter of Mayflower passenger Isaac Allerton and great granddaughter of William Brewster.

== Death and legacy ==
Travers died intestate in Lancaster County before April 1679, and his widow was appointed as his executor. His successor as Speaker, Mathew Kemp, represented Gloucester County before his speakership and until his elevation to the Governor's Council. His eldest son, Samuel Travers, received the majority of his estate (noting that some quitrents were in arrears) in 1685, and would like his father, hold local offices as well as represented Richmond County after is creation in the House of Burgesses.
