= Mathew Kemp (politician) =

Virginia politician d. 1682

Speaker of the House of Burgesses
- In office 1679
- Preceded by: William Travers
- Succeeded by: Thomas Ballard

Member of the Virginia Governor's Council
- In office 1681-1682

Member of the House of Burgesses representing Gloucester COunty
- In office 1679-1680 Serving with John Armistead
- Preceded by: Peter Jenings
- Succeeded by: Henry Whiting

Personal details
- Born: ca. 1630 Gissing, Norfolk, England
- Died: 1682 Virginia Colony, British America
- Spouse: Dorothy (surname unknown)
- Children: Mathew Kemp Jr. (1650-1716)
- Parent(s): Edmund Kemp, Anna
- Profession: attorney, planter, politician

Mathew Kemp (c. 1630 – December 1682) was an English attorney who emigrated from England to the Colony of Virginia where he became a government official, planter and politician. He supported Governor William Berkeley during Bacon's Rebellion and became Speaker of the House of Burgesses in 1679 before being elevated to the Virginia Governor's Council.

== Early and family life ==
Born to Edmund Kemp and his wife. Edmund Kemp had emigrated to then-vast Lancaster County in the Colony of Virginia and became a planter and justice of the peace (all the justices in that era jointly administering the county). Mathew Kemp was educated in England and emigrated to Virginia before October 1660. His grandfather was Robert Kemp of Gissing in Norfolk, England and his uncle the baronet Sir Robert Kemp.

He married a woman named Dorothy and had a son, also Mathew Kemp, who later served as Burgess for Middlesex County.

== Planter ==
In October 1660, Kemp patented 500 acres at the head of the Potomac River, and he and Peter Jenings(who died in 1672) later patented 1,000 acres at the falls or head of the Potomac as well as 1,000 acres on the northern branch of the Corotoman River in Lancaster County. In that era, land could be patented based upon the number of emigrants for whose passage to the colony the patentee had paid, and the patentee was also required to improve the land by creating a residence or farm. In 1661, Kemp reasserted his father's patent for 1,000 acres on the Pianketank creek in Gloucester County. He inherited land in Lancaster County from his father, although in 1662 he had to assert his interest in court as attorney for Sir Gray Skipwith, who had married his widowed mother and had been named as executor of Edmund Kemp's estate. Middlesex County would later be split from Lancaster County, and Kemp initially lived on that property, but later moved to Gloucester County in 1674. Edmund Kemp in 1650 had previously inherited land from Sir Richard Kemp, his uncle who had served as the colony's secretary and on the Governor's Council but whose sole child (a daughter) died before reaching marriageable age. In 1675 Kemp claimed 575 acres in Gloucester County (purchasing 400 and claiming 173 for importing immigrants) and his son Mathew Kemp Jr. patented another 229 acres. In 1677 Kemp sold the Potomac River tract he had owned with Peter Jenings (which would today be near Washington, D.C.).

== Colonial official ==
By 1663, Kemp had been elected as Lancaster County's sheriff, and he later served as county lieutenant for Gloucester County. In March 1661, the Virginia General Assembly named him to arrange a land transaction between Moore Fauntleroy and the Rappahannock Native Americans. He also sat on courts-martial in 1673 and 1677.

During Bacon's Rebellion, Kemp supported Governor William Berkeley, so Nathaniel Bacon named him among the governor's "wicked and pernicious councillor, aiders and assistants against the Commonality." As a result, his property sustained damage from the raiders. Nonetheless, he led the Gloucester County cavalry against the rebels.

In 1678 and 1679, Gloucester County voters elected Kemp as one of their representatives in the House of Burgesses, and in 1679, the burgesses elected Kemp as their Speaker. Kemp however, was more closely allied with former speaker Augustine Warner Jr. than the Governor and later his widow's Green Spring faction. While Speaker, he sidestepped the most divisive issue of public claims arising from Bacon's Rebellion. Instead, he joined with Governor Sir Henry Chicheley in requesting the king pay the soldiers sent to Virginia to quash Bacon's Rebellion. Nonetheless, the burgesses refused to re-elect him as Speaker in the next session; he was in third place after Thomas Ballard and Isaac Allerton, and the House chose Robert Beverley as clerk.

Kemp was appointed a member of the Governor's Council, and sworn in on July 8, 1680. However, the colony was soon in crisis, due to an oversupply of tobacco in Europe, and some proposed no tobacco be planted for a year to relieve the flooded market. When the House of Burgesses met in April, some hoped that it would restrict tobacco planting, but instead Lt. Governor Sir Henry Chicheley prorougued the House upon orders of Governor Culpeper, who had traveled to England for consultations, but within two weeks some people in Gloucester County were cutting down tobacco plants, first on their own farms, then those of others, supposedly instigated by Major Robert Beverley, the house clerk. On May 8, 1682, Governor Chicheley reported to the King that he had dispatched Col. Kemp with orders to raise cavalry and infantry to suppress insurgent small planters who planned to destroy part of the tobacco crop in order to raise prices in the glutted market. Kemp made arrests before his death the following year.

== Death and legacy ==
Kemp died in December 1682, shortly before Governor Culpeper's return from England, and so did not see Batholomew Black Austen, one of the tobacco cutters, hanged in front of the Gloucester County courthouse. He left his estate to his son, Mathew Kemp Jr., who would also serve in the House of Burgesses.
