= Christopher Robinson (burgess) =

18th-century American politician

Member of the House of Burgesses for Middlesex County
- In office 1705–1715 Serving with Henry Beverley, John Robinson
- Preceded by: William Churchill
- Succeeded by: Edwin Hamerton

Personal details
- Born: c1679 Middlesex County, Colony of Virginia
- Died: February 20, 1726/7 Middlesex County, Colony of Virginia
- Spouse: Judith Wormeley Beverley
- Children: Christopher Robinson Jr.
- Relatives: Bishop John Robinson (uncle), Christopher Robinson (father)
- Occupation: Planter, militia officer, politician

Christopher Robinson (c1679-February 20, 1726/7) was a Virginia-born planter and politician who followed the path of his merchant and emigrant father, Col. Christopher Robinson, the patriarch of the Robinson family of Virginia.

== Early life and education ==
His father, a planter, merchant, burgess and then member of the Governor's Council in 1692, died when he was twelve, so merchant and former burgess William Churchill, his father's executor, became guardian for Christopher and his elder brother John. Robinson then finished his education at William and Mary College in Williamsburg, which had become the colony's seat of government.

== Career ==
Upon reaching legal age, Robinson inherited his father's lands, especially Hewick plantation in Middlesex County, but also land in several counties in Virginia's Tidewater region, which he farmed using overseers and enslaved labor. Robinson also followed his father's career path by serving as a local justice of the peace, as well as in the House of Burgesses. However, unlike many other large planters, who meted out punishment on the plantation instead of bringing matters to court, between 1711 and 1725, of the 54 slaves brought before the Middlesex court for disciplining, 34 belonged to this Christopher Robinson. Many of the offenses related to stealing food, especially hogs. One slave, Charles, was brought before the court three times with confederates. On the first hog stealing offense, all were lashed, but when Charles was convicted a second time, his ears were chopped off, and he was executed after his third conviction.

== Personal life ==
In 1703, Robinson married the former Judith Wormeley, the daughter of Col. Christopher Wormeley (a nearby major planter who had served on the Governor's Council until his death in 1698) and widow of both William Beverley and Corbin Griffin, likewise all of the First Families of Virginia. They had seven children, of whom their first- and last-born sons Christopher Robinson Jr. (1705-1768) and Peter Robinson (1718-1765) would also continue the family's planter and political traditions. Their middle son John Robinson (1708-1787) married Miss Yates, then Miss Churchill. Otherwise, their eldest daughter became the first wife of Col. Barclay, their second daughter died aged about 5 years, and only birth dates are known for the second Judith (born 1711), Benjamin (born 1707), William (born 1716 and still alive in 1765) and Frances (born 1714), so they either died as infants or moved away.
