= Hewick =

Historic house in Virginia, United States

- U.S. National Register of Historic Places
- Virginia Landmarks Register
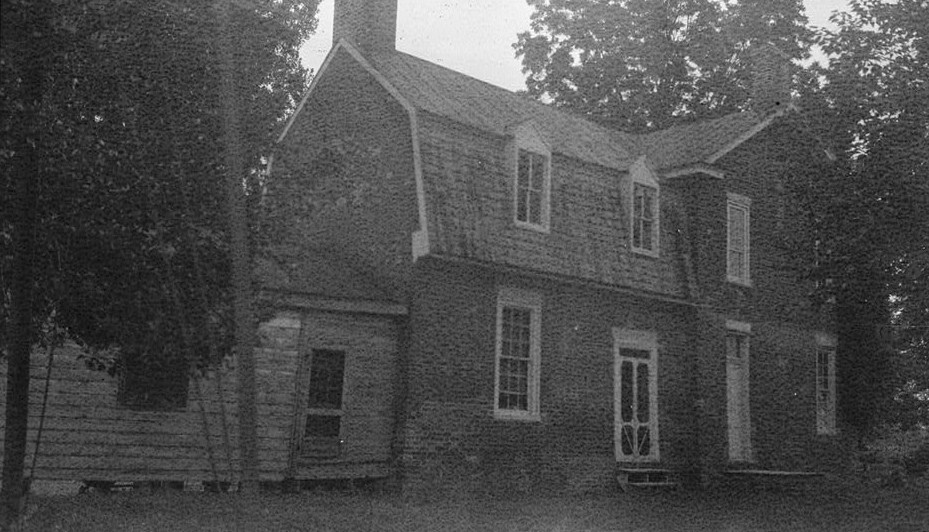
- Hewick House, HABS Photo

- Location within Virginia Location within the United States
- Location: Northwest of Urbanna, near Urbanna, Virginia
- Coordinates: 37°38′26″N 76°35′15″W
- Area: 24 acres (9.7 ha)
- Built: c. 1678
- NRHP reference No.: 78003030
- VLR No.: 059-0006

Significant dates
- Added to NRHP: November 17, 1978
- Designated VLR: July 18, 1978

Hewick is a historic home located near Urbanna, Middlesex County, Virginia. It was constructed in 1678 by Christopher Robinson, whose progeny held considerable power in the colony before the American Revolution, during which some members became loyalists. It was listed on the United States National Register of Historic Places in 1978.

Now a two-story, five-bay, L-shaped brick dwelling, it originally had 1 1/2 stories, but raised to a full two stories in the mid-19th century. The rear ell is popularly believed to have been built in the late 17th century.

It is currently operated as a wedding venue.
