= Henry Chicheley =

Lt. Governor and Acting Governor of Virginia

Sir Henry Chicheley

Lieutenant Governor of Virginia Colony
- Acting Governor, 1678 – 1680; 1680 – 1682
- In office 1674 – February 5, 1683
- Monarch: Charles II
- Governor: Sir William Berkeley; Thomas Colepeper, 2nd Baron Colepeper
- Preceded by: Sir Herbert Jeffreys
- Succeeded by: Francis Nicholson

Member of the House of Burgesses for Lancaster County, Virginia Colony

Personal details
- Born: 1614 or 1615 Wimpole Estate Cambridgeshire, England
- Died: 5 February 1683 Rosegill, Virginia, U.S.
- Education: B.A., University College, Oxford

Military service
- Service: Royalist
- Years of service: 1642–1644
- Rank: Lieutenant Colonel
- Wars: English Civil War

Sir Henry Chicheley (b. 1614 or 1615 – d. 1683) was a lieutenant governor of Virginia Colony who also served as Acting Governor during multiple periods in the aftermath of Bacon's Rebellion. Having first visited the Virginia colony as a Royalist in exile, where he served in the House of Burgesses in violation of his probation, Lt. Gov. Chicheley wielded power during a period of sociopolitical turmoil and change, and later in his career was increasingly troubled by England's growing aggression and control over the colony.

== Early life and education ==
Chicheley was born in either 1614 or 1615 to Dorothy, the wife of Sir Thomas Chicheley of Wimpole Estate, Cambridgeshire, England]. His name honours Henry Chichele, Archbishop of Canterbury and founder of All Souls College, Oxford, from whom he is a collateral descendent. He received a Bachelor's degree from University College, University of Oxford in 1635.

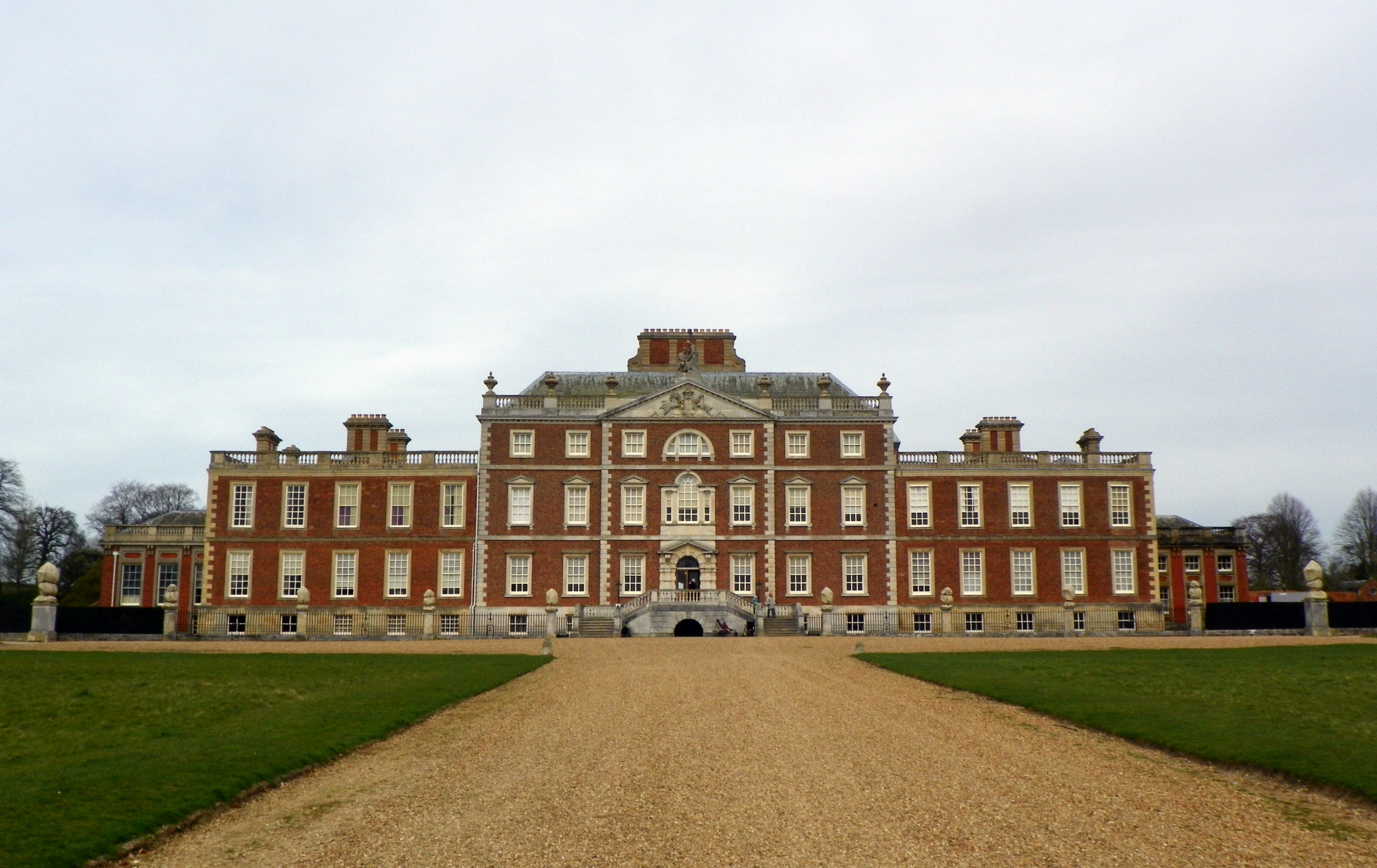
Wimpole, Cambridgeshire, Chicheley's ancestral home

== Royalist ==
Enlisting as a Royalist of the Royal English Army during the English Civil Wars, Chicheley attained the rank of lieutenant colonel before Charles I knighted him in 1644 for his loyalty to the Crown.

Chicheley was detained in the Tower of London for alleged complicity in a plotted coup against the Parliament of England. In 1650, the Council of State paroled Chicheley and granted him permission to sail to Virginia so long as he did “nothing prejudicial to the State and present government thereof.”

== Exile to Virginia ==
Coat of Arms of Henry Chicheley

Upon arrival to Virginia, Chicheley quickly established himself within society and among fellow supporters of the Crown. In 1652, Chicheley married Agatha Eltonhead Stubbins Wormeley, the wealthy and influential widow of Ralph Wormeley Sr.

The marriage gave Chicheley control of the properties and estates owned by the Wormeley family, including the Rosegill estate. Chicheley is named on a land patent dated June 9, 1654, for 950 acres along the Rappahannock River. With his newly obtained land and farms, Chicheley tended silkworms and produced silk for export to England, and established mulberry orchards.

=== From burgess to lieutenant governor ===
In 1656, Chicheley served as a member of the Virginia House of Burgesses representing Lancaster County. After violating the terms of his parole, he returned to England, where he engaged with supporters of Charles II who were plotting the Stuart Restoration of 1660. Chichely returned to Virginia in 1662.

In April 1670, Colonial Governor of Virginia Sir William Berkeley appointed Chicheley to the Virginia Governor's Council. Two years later, he was appointed Lieutenant General of the Virginia Militia in 1672. Chicheley’s used his influence with his brother Sir Thomas Chicheley the younger, the royal Master-General of the Ordnance, to obtain arms and ammunition during the Third Anglo-Dutch War.

Governor Berkeley arranged with King Charles II to appoint Chicheley as lieutenant governor of Virginia Colony in 1674. As lieutenant governor, Chicheley advocated restrictions on tobacco cultivation to increase its price and to help promote further agricultural diversification in the colony.

==== Bacon's Rebellion and recall to England ====
In 1675, Chicheley stood by Governor Berkeley during Bacon's Rebellion. The Baconians regarded Chicheley as a traitor to their cause and held him hostage for a brief period. In the aftermath of the rebellion, Berkeley was relieved of the governorship and recalled to England. On December 30, 1678, Chicheley became acting governor of Virginia, a position he held until May 1680.

==== Return as lieutenant governor ====
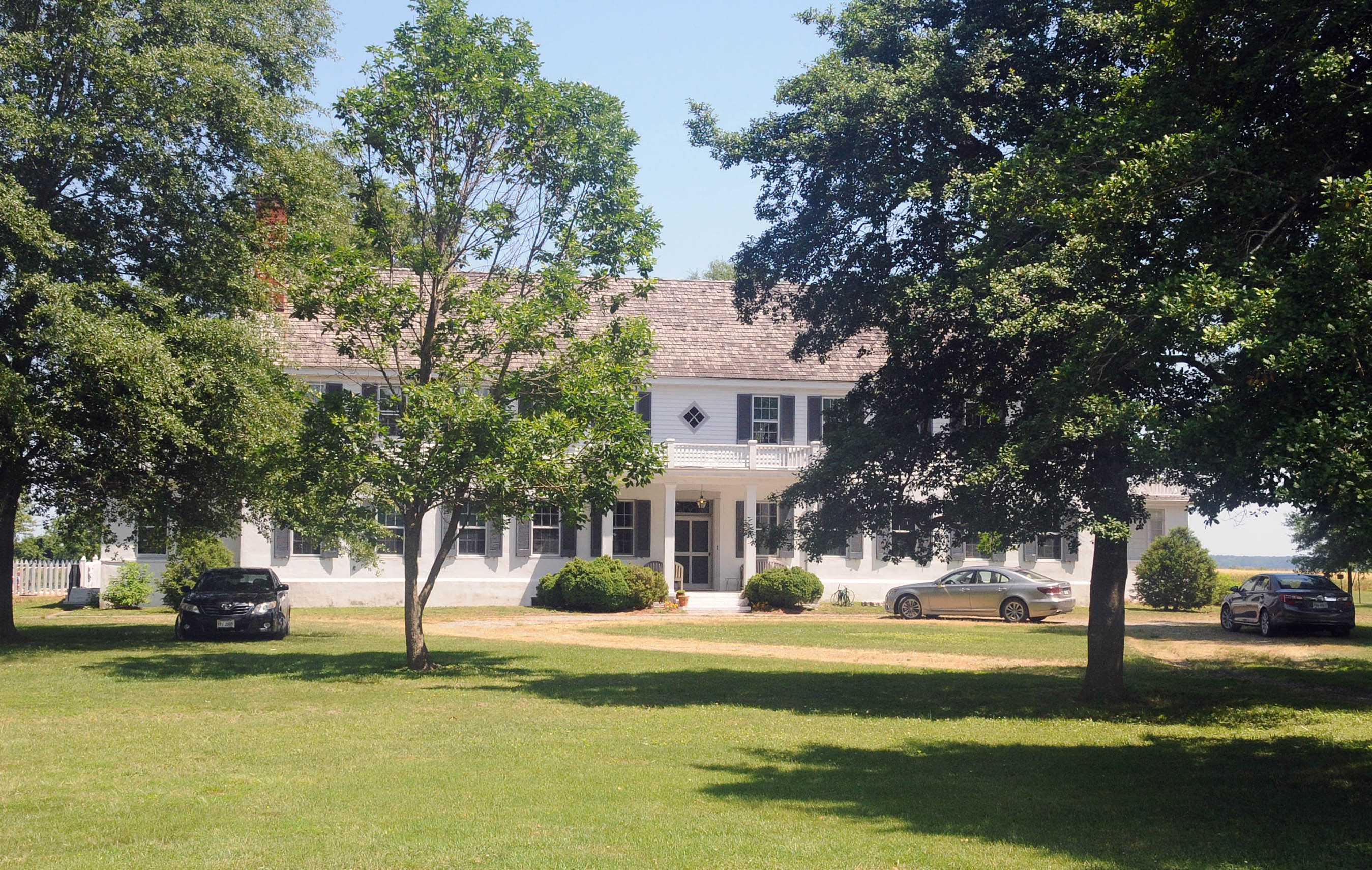
Rosegill Estate, Urbanna, Virginia

In May 1680, Chicheley returned to his post as lieutenant governor upon the arrival of newly appointed Governor Thomas Colepeper, 2nd Baron Colepeper, who only remained in the territory for a few months. He served as acting governor during Colepeper's absence from August 1680 to December 1682 during his travels and time away from Virginia.

In the Spring of 1682, in response to falling tobacco prices, disgruntled farmers deliberately cut down tobacco seedlings on over 200 plantations in protest. Chicheley played a central role in quelling the plant-cutter riots of Virginia and preventing further intervention from the Crown.

== Death and legacy ==
After Colepeper returned to Britain, Chicheley remained in Virginia, continuing as lieutenant governor from December 1682 until his death in February 1683 at his Rosegill estate. He is interred in the chancel of Christ Church, Middlesex County, and named on a plaque on the cemetery wall commemorating the founders of Virginia, installed by the Virginia Society Order of Founders and Patriots of America.

== See also ==
- History of Virginia
- List of colonial governors of Virginia
