= Rosegill =

Historic house in Virginia, United States

- U.S. National Register of Historic Places
- Virginia Landmarks Register
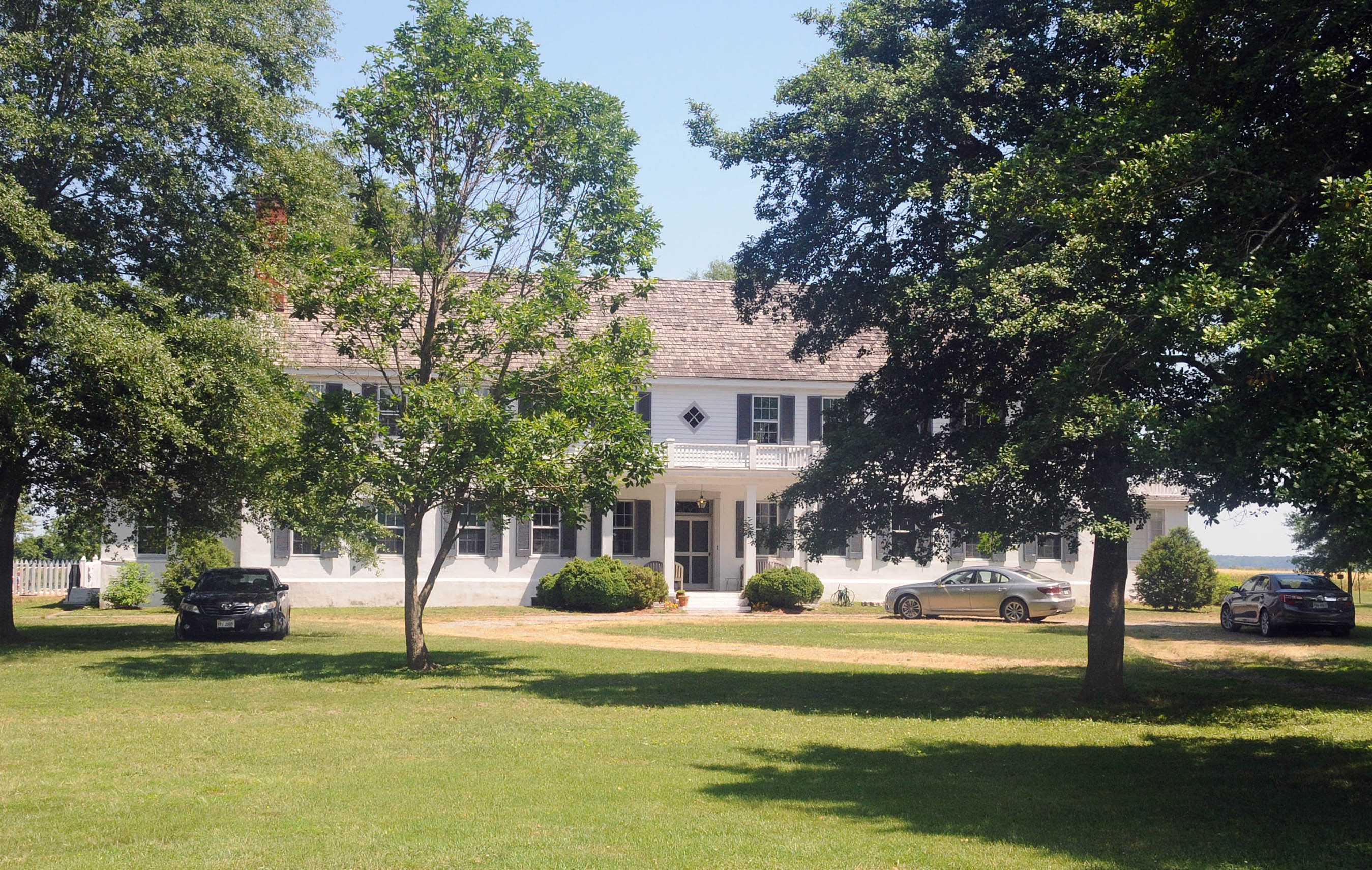

- Location within Virginia Location within the United States
- Location: East of Urbanna off VA 227, near Urbanna, Virginia
- Coordinates: 37°37′39″N 76°33′57″W
- Area: 400 acres (160 ha)
- Built: c. 1740, c. 1850
- NRHP reference No.: 73002040
- VLR No.: 059-0009

Significant dates
- Added to NRHP: November 27, 1973
- Designated VLR: February 10, 1973

Rosegill is a historic plantation house and farm complex located near Urbanna, Middlesex County, Virginia. It has been listed on the National Register of Historic Places since 1973.

== History ==
In 1649, Ralph Wormeley Sr. patented more than 3,200 acres of land on the lower side of the Rappahannock River, east of Nimcock Creek (a/k/a Rosegill Creek). It contained both the old and new Nimcock native American towns. Within a year Wormeley built a house for his bride, the former Agatha Eltonhead, who had survived her first husband, Luke Stubbinge of Northampton County. Wormeley was at the time a burgess for York County and the next year received an appointment to the Virginia Governor's Council. However, he died in 1651, leaving behind an infant son Ralph Wormeley Jr. His widow soon married Sir Henry Chicheley, who became the colony's lieutenant governor, as well as lived at and operated Rosegill. Chicheley died at Rosegill, as many years later would Ralph Wormeley Jr. Both Chicheley and his stepson Ralph Wormeley Jr. (who also served as a burgess before being named to the Governor's Council) supported Governor William Berkeley during Bacon's Rebellion in 1676, during which the plantation was plundered and both men imprisoned for a time.

Most of the buildings now on the side were constructed by the grandson of Ralph Wormeley Jr., Ralph Wormeley IV (1715-1790). Although his grandfather was the family's most powerful member, and served on the Virginia Governor's Council and briefly as acting governor, this man (or he and his son) represented Middlesex County in the House of Burgesses before the French and Indian War and in the Virginia House of Delegates following the American Revolutionary War. The last generation of Wormeleys to live at the plantation was Ralph Wormeley V, who ardently supported the British cause in the American Revolutionary War and was sent by his father to supervise lands in Berkeley County in western Virginia.

== Architecture ==
The house is an 11-bay, two story dwelling with a gable roof. The original section dates to about 1740, and the house was subsequently enlarged and modified to reach its present form about 1850. Another remodeling occurred in the 1940s. Also located on the property are a mid-18th century kitchen and wash house, mid-18th century office, a 19th-century frame smokehouse, and a 19th-century bake oven.

Captain John Bailey bought the property in 1849 and renovated it, including removing the roof and raising the second floor to a full storey with a gable roof, and replacing the porch. The property also underwent an extensive remodeling in the 1940s.

== Current status ==
It is currently privately owned and operated as a rental property.
