= Virginia Governor's Council =

Upper legislative house of Colony of Virginia

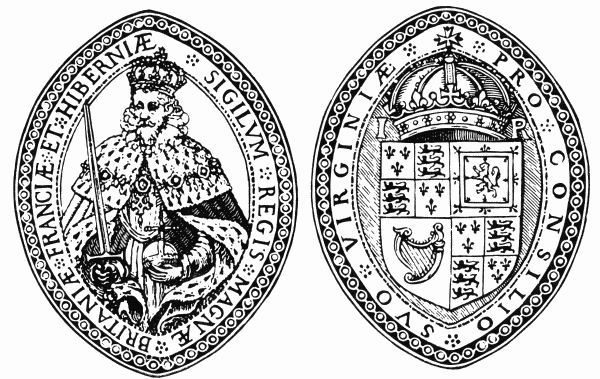
- Seal of the Governor's Council circa 1725

Type
- Type: Upper house, council of state

History
- Established: 1607
- Disbanded: 1852
- Succeeded by: Virginia Senate; Supreme Court of Virginia

Structure
- Seats: 8 (1776–1830); 3 (1830–1852)
- Length of term: 1–3 years

Meeting place
- Jamestown, Virginia (1619–1699); Williamsburg, Virginia (1699–1780); Richmond, Virginia (1780–1852)

The Governor's Council, also known as the Privy Council and Council of State, was the upper house of the legislature of the Colony of Virginia (the House of Burgesses being the other house). It also served as an advisory body to the royal governor and as the highest judicial body in the colony. Beginning in the 1630s, its 12 members were appointed by the British sovereign. After Virginia declared its independence from Great Britain in 1776, members were appointed by the General Assembly, and most of their powers were redistributed to the newly formed Senate of Virginia and the state's judiciary. The council was formally abolished after delegates to the 1850 Virginia constitutional convention voted to enact what became known as the "Reform Constitution," which vested many of its remaining functions in the popularly elected offices of Governor, Lieutenant Governor, and Attorney General.

== Organization ==
The Council consisted of no more than 12 men who served lifetime appointments to advise the governor and were, together with the governor, the highest court in the colony. Thus this body served as a legislative, executive, and judicial body. Modeled after the British House of Lords, the Governor's Council went through an evolution as the Virginia colony grew.

During much of the colonial period, the governor was absentee and the lieutenant governor was the beneficiary of the council's advice. When both were absent, the longest-serving member of the council, entitled the President of the council, would serve as acting governor.

During the Commonwealth of Oliver Cromwell between 1652 and 1660, the House of Burgesses elected the members of the council. After the restoration of the monarchy, the Crown again appointed the council, typically from among the landed and wealthy Virginia planters.

== History ==
=== Virginia Company (1607–1624) ===
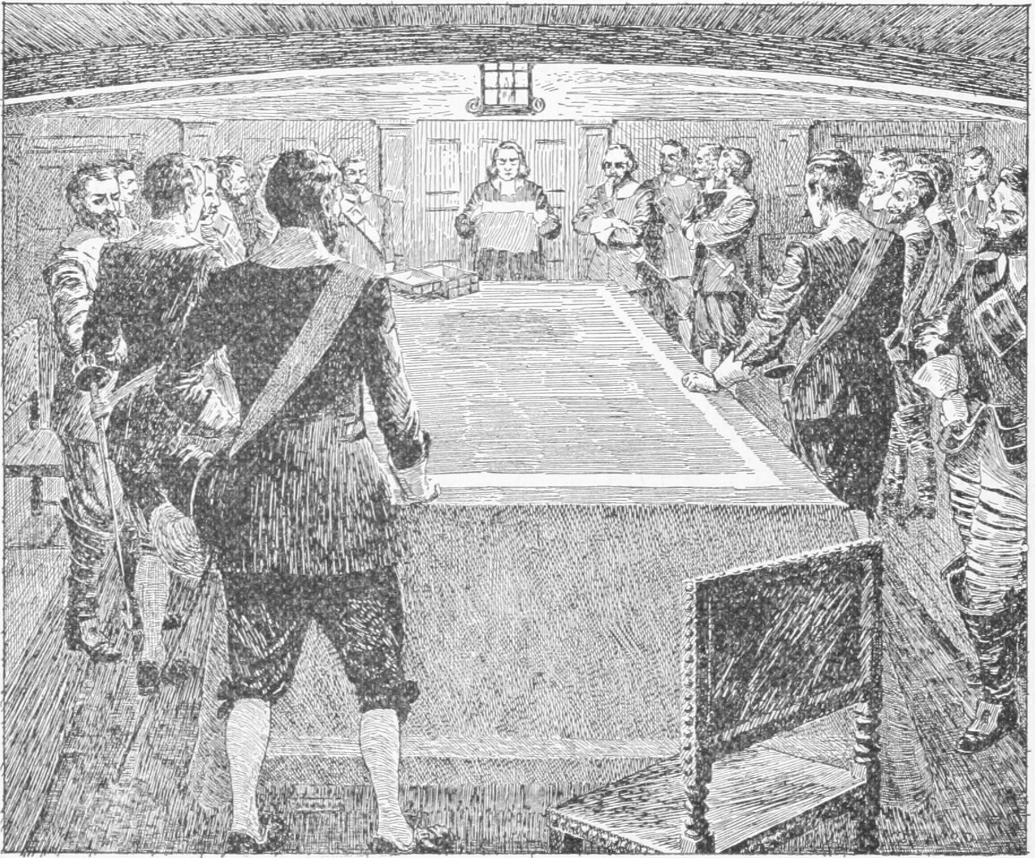
Reverend Hunt reads the chosen council members of Jamestown, Virginia as selected by the London Company, 1607

Virginia was founded under a charter granted by King James I to the Virginia Company in 1606. In 1607, the company's governing board in London appointed a small group of seven men to manage the day-to-day affairs of the colony on their behalf after the first settlers landed on the Virginia Peninsula. On April 26, 1607, the Council elected Captain Edward Maria Wingfield as its president, and he would later choose the site for the founding of the Jamestown settlement.

There was a lack of strong leadership among the council, which became apparent as soon as they landed at Jamestown in 1607. Internal dissension, allegations of lying, and the unexpected deaths of some councilors reduced the Governor's Council to a small group and finally only one person by the winter of 1608–1609. At that point, the Virginia Company essentially declared martial law and suspended the minimal semblance of collaborative government. The era of near-dictatorial power by the governor ended in 1618 following the king's issuance of the third royal charter.

As a result, a representative and consultative government was created. It was composed of the following establishments: a governor appointed by the Virginia Company of London, and a council of state, whose members were also chosen by the Virginia Company. The Governor's Council was charged with assisting the new governor in the execution of his duties, the first of which was, "the Advancement of the Honour and Service of God, and the Enlargement of his Kingdom amongst the Heathen People." The other branch of government was a General Assembly that included the Council and a House of Burgesses that included two "burgesses" from every town, hundred, and particular plantation "chosen by the [free] inhabitants thereof". This new political structure necessarily reduced the power of the governor, a previously unilaterally powerful office that had been appointed for life. Under the new charter, sometimes called the Great Charter, Council decisions were made by majority vote, and the governor was only able to cast the deciding vote in the case of a tie. The General Assembly, which included both a popularly elected (albeit not universally enfranchised) and an Executive-Legislative hybrid based somewhat on the British system, was to be the voice of the colonists in Virginia, providing a check on the power of the governor.

Members of Virginia's first legislative assembly, which was a unicameral session including burgesses, the council, and the governor, gathered at the rough-hewn Anglican Jamestown Church on July 30, 1619. This was the first representative government in the European colonies in North America. Before they adjourned, the assembly had adopted new laws for the colonists as well as programs designed to encourage settlement and improve economic growth in Virginia.

=== Royal colony (1624–1776) ===
In 1624, the Virginia Company's charter was revoked by King James I, and the Virginia Colony was transferred to royal authority as a crown colony. The Council continued to be appointed and serve as advisors to the now royally-appointed governor and serve as the highest court of the colony. Until 1643, the council and burgesses continued to sit as a unicameral legislature. After 1643, the General Assembly became bicameral and the council was the upper house. The council continued to exercise legislative, administrative, and judicial functions.

In the 1652–1660 period when Britain was not a monarchy due to the overthrow of King Charles I and execution in the English Civil War and erection of the Commonwealth of England under Oliver Cromwell, the members of the council, instead of being appointed by the head of state in London, were elected by the burgesses in Virginia.

Although the monarch appointed the members of the council, resident royal governors or lieutenant governors (who acted as governor in the absence of the royal governor) often made recommendations to the king when a vacancy occurred. The appointees were almost always among the most prominent planters and merchants in the colony. "The members of the Council were almost all wealthy and both socially and politically prominent. Independent wealth was required both for the social standing necessary for membership and also to permit the members to be absent from their families and plantations for long periods of time," according to the Encyclopedia Virginia.

During the years from 1643 to 1676, the Council met at the upper house of the General Assembly annually. From 1676 to 1776, the Governor's Council met about 8 times a decade as a legislative body, but starting in the middle of the 1600s the Council met quarterly for judicial sessions. Additionally, they convened as advisors to the governor at least annually, often for weeks at a time. In order to compensate the councilors for their time, starting in the 1640s the assembly granted them a dispensation from taxes. Encyclopedia Virginia states that "Membership on the governor's Council was the highest civil office to which natives or residents of the colony could normally aspire, and membership on the Council enabled wealthy and influential men to increase the wealth and influence of themselves and their families."

=== After independence ===
On June 29, 1776, Virginia ratified its constitution, which distributed state power among three branches of the new government: the executive, the judiciary, and the legislature. The council, part of the executive branch, lost most of its formal powers. Its members—appointed by the legislature—were primarily tasked with serving as advisors to the Governor, who was also appointed by the legislature. Delegates to the 1850 Virginia constitutional convention chose not to retain the council as a formal body, vesting many of its remaining functions in the popularly-elected offices of Governor, Lieutenant Governor, and Attorney General.

=== Records ===
The extant written records of the council begin in 1680 and are housed at the Library of Virginia.

== See also ==
- General Court of Virginia (colonial) – about the Council in its capacity as a court.
