= Francis Dade =

Francis Dade may refer to:

- Francis L. Dade (c. 1793–1835), U.S. Army officer
- Francis Dade (politician) (1621–1662), English-born Virginia politician and landowner

== See also ==
- Frances Dade (1910–1968), American film actress
