= Belle Air Plantation =

Historic house in Virginia, United States

- Belle Air
- U.S. National Register of Historic Places
- Virginia Landmarks Register
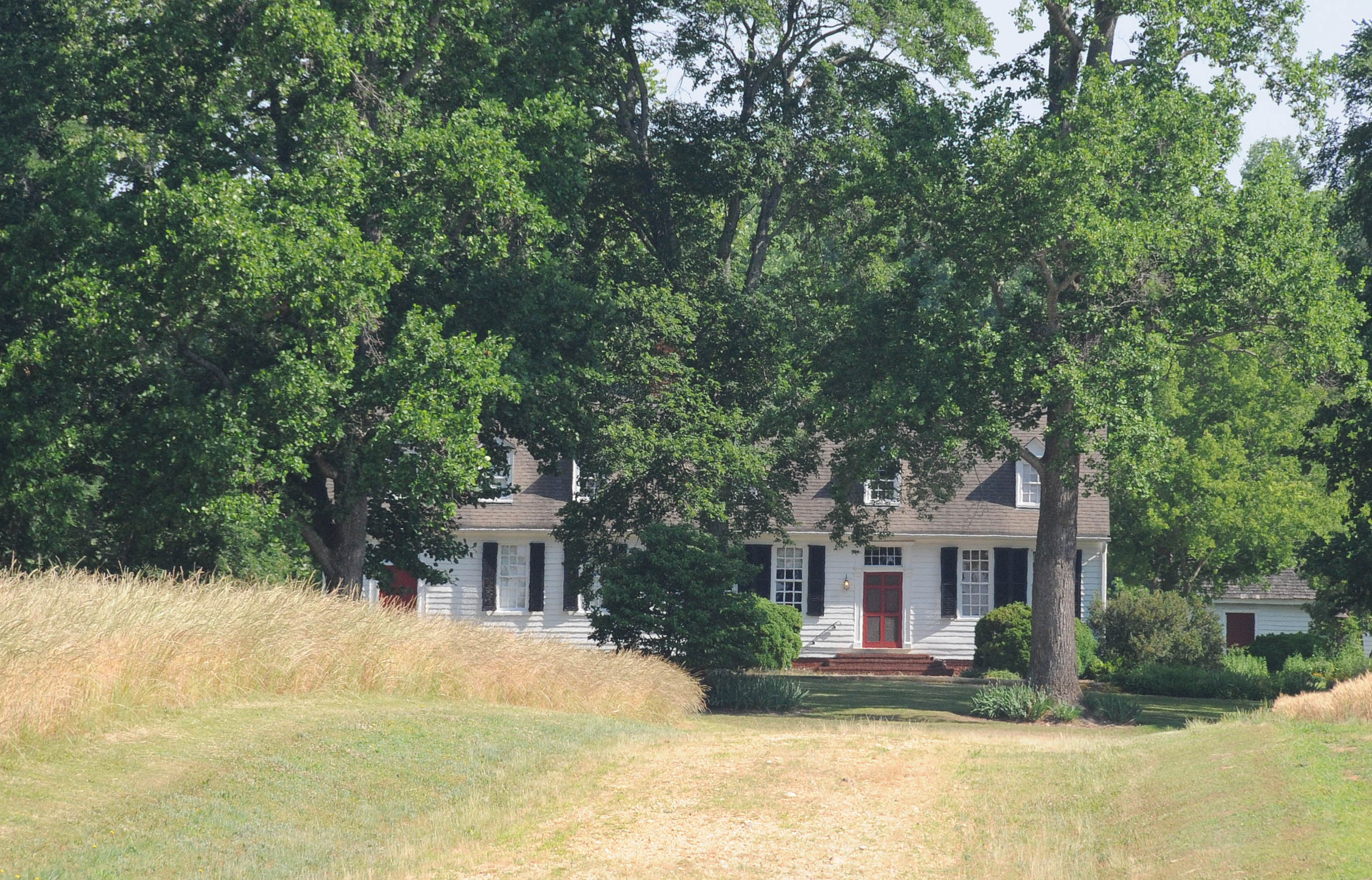
- Belle Air in May 2019
- Interactive map showing Belle Air's location
- Location: Charles City County, Virginia near Charles City, Virginia, U.S.
- Coordinates: 37°20′49″N 77°3′40″W
- Area: 135 acres (55 ha)
- Built: Circa 1725–40
- Architectural style: Vernacular
- NRHP reference No.: 74002232
- VLR No.: 018-0036

Significant dates
- Added to NRHP: July 18, 1974
- Designated VLR: January 15, 1974

Belle Air is a historic house and plantation located on the north bank of the James River near Charles City in the Tidewater region of Virginia. The plantation was the residence of several slaveholding Virginian families beginning around the late seventeenth century, although the existing house was probably not built until the first part of the eighteenth century. The site was listed in the National Register of Historic Places in 1974 for its architectural significance as an unusually well-preserved example of the vernacular style during the reign of William III and Mary II.

== History ==
Belle Aire was continuously occupied from the late seventeenth until the early twentieth century by successive generations of several Virginian families. In the 1950s, the property was acquired by Mr. and Mrs. Walter O. Major, who restored the eighteenth century plantation house and operated it as a historic house museum. The Majors conducted "extensive" research into the past ownership of the site and concluded that the original owner of the earliest occupant of the property had been Thomas Stegg Jr., who inherited the plantation from his father upon the latter's death in 1652. Stegg began construction of the original manor house in 1655. As the story goes, in 1662, David Clarke purchased part of Stegg's holdings in Charles City County, including the original manor house, which he christened "Windsor." Clarke and his descendants continued to own the property until 1800, when it was purchased by Hamlin Willcox; during this time, the present house was constructed, probably between 1725 and 1740, and the property acquired the name "Belle Air." The property remained in the Willcox family until 1945, although the house was probably deserted sometime in the 1920s. The Majors' research became the basis for the 1974 nominating petition to list the property in the Virginia Landmarks Register and the National Register of Historic Places, and as of 2026 remains the generally accepted account of the site's history by both the National Park Service and the Virginia Department of Historic Resources.

In his 1994 monograph, The Bradfords of Charles City County, Virginia, genealogist David Thomas Bradford contradicted the Majors' account and asserted that the plantation had in fact belonged to his ancestor, Richard Bradford I. Bradford cited the work of fellow genealogist Peter Sandlund to argue that the Bradford family (and not David Clarke) acquired the property sometime during the 1650s and continued to operate the plantation until 1729. Based on the work of architectural historian Cary Carson, Bradford concluded that the existing house was built after the Bradford family left the site in the late 1720s.

=== Slavery ===
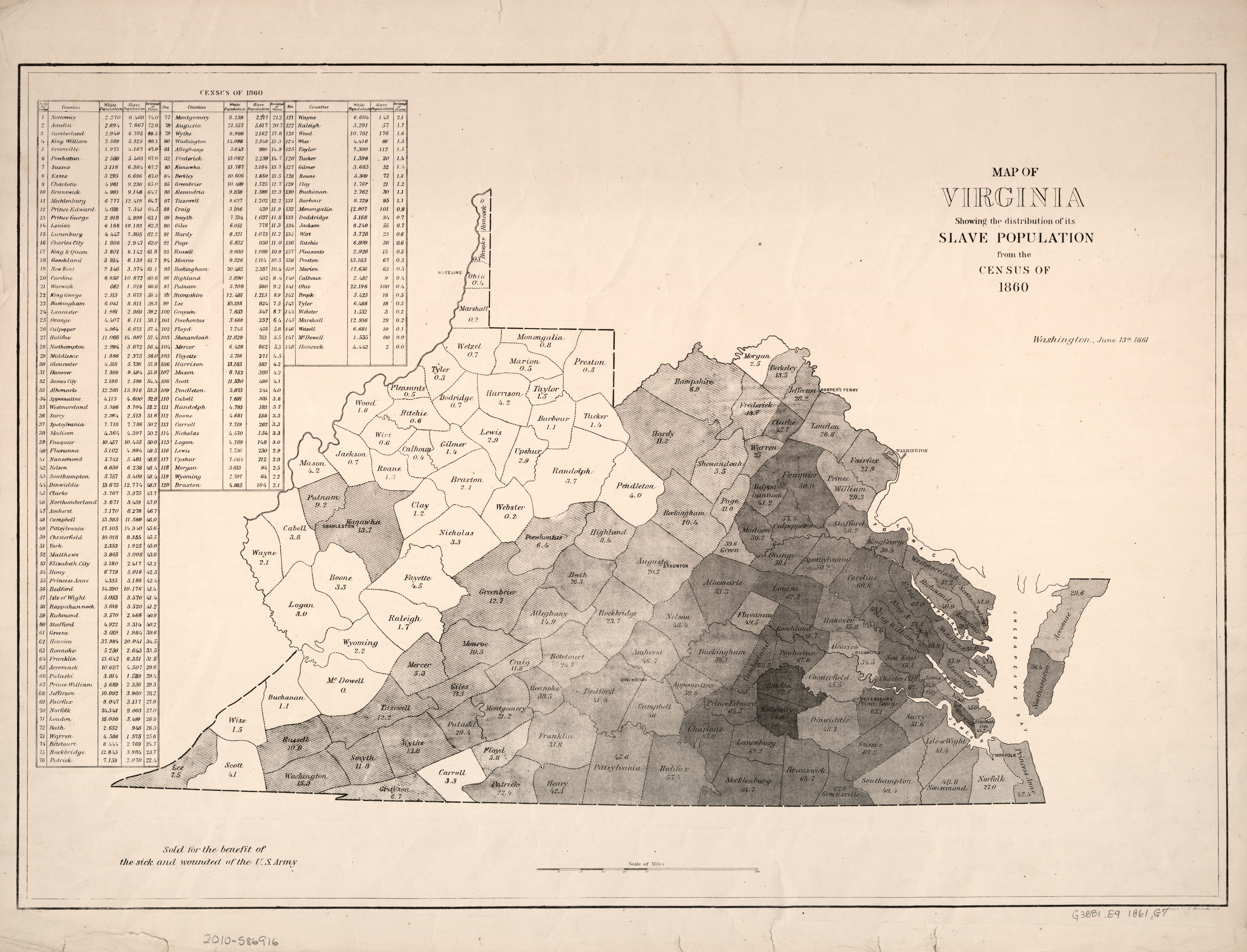
Map of Virginia Showing the Distribution of its Slave Population from the Census of 1860

The owners of Belle Air Plantation were slaveholders. Slavery was ubiquitous in Southeastern Virginia; enslaved people outnumbered free people in the region, whose economy was based on the cultivation of tobacco and other cash crops. Slavery and the Atlantic slave trade tied Virginia to the Atlantic World and formed the basis for the wealth and influence of the planter class. The Virginian-born economist and slaveholder Thomas Roderick Dew calculated the capital value of the enslaved population of Virginia at $100,000,000 in 1832, or roughly one-third of the state's total accumulated wealth. The apportionment of representation in the Virginia General Assembly allowed Tidewater planters to dominate the legislature despite representing a minority of the voting population, while the Three-fifths Compromise similarly multiplied their influence in the United States Congress. Simultaneously, the willingness of enslaved people to adopt violent methods of resistance—resulting in major planned or effected rebellions in 1800 and 1831—led the planters to adopt increasingly draconian measures of social control in the decades preceding the American Civil War.

The plantation economy of the Chesapeake Bay was more diversified than that of the Carolinas, and enslaved people were skilled workers as well as agricultural laborers. Ninety percent of enslaved people in Virginia were born in North America in the late eighteenth century, compared to 65 percent in the Carolinas. Enslaved people accounted for 62 percent of the total population of Charles City County in the 1860 United States census conducted immediately prior to the Civil War.

== Architecture ==
Belle Air is a surviving example of a wooden house with post medieval-style exposed interior timber framing. It may the oldest plantation dwelling along State Route 5.The original five-bay portion of Belle Air possesses architectural details characteristic of seventeenth century construction with a floor plan and façade fenestration characteristic of 18th-century design. The post medieval-style exposed interior timber framing is the only example found in a frame building in Virginia. The hand-hewn timbers serve as both structural framing and decorative woodwork. Summer beams, which run through the center of the ceilings into the chimneys, serve as the principal supporting members for the floor joists above. On the property there is also a contributing frame smokehouse with a pyramidal roof, and a frame kitchen.

== See also ==
- List of James River plantations

== Bibliography ==
- Bradford, David Thomas (1994). The Bradfords of Charles City County, Virginia [...]. Baltimore: Gateway Press.
- Curtis, Christopher Michael (2012). Jefferson's Freeholders and the Politics of Ownership in the Old Dominion. New York: Cambridge University Press.
- Eichstedt, Jennifer L. (2002). Representations of Slavery: Race and Ideology in Southern Plantation Museums. Washington: Smithsonian Institution Press.
- Hergesheimer, E. (1861). Map Showing the Distribution of the Slave Population of the Southern States of the United States. Washington.
- National Park Service (n.d.). "Charles City County: Belle Air". National Park Service.
- Roberts, Bruce (1990). Plantation Homes of the James River. Chapel Hill: University of North Carolina Press.
- Tomlins, Christopher (2020). In the Matter of Nat Turner: A Speculative History. Princeton: Princeton University Press.
- Virginia Department of Historic Resources (August 23, 2024). "Belle Air". Virginia Department of Historic Resources.
- Virginia Historic Landmarks Commission (January 1974). Belle Air (PDF) (Report). National Register of Historic Places.
- Wood, Gordon (2009). Empire of Liberty: A History of the Early Republic, 1789–1815. New York: Oxford University Press.
