= Edward Hill (Virginian politician) =

Virginia planter, soldier and politician (died c. 1662)

Colonel Edward Hill Sr.
- Shirley historical marker

Speaker of the Virginia House of Burgesses
- In office 1659–1659
- Preceded by: John Smith
- Succeeded by: Theodorick Bland of Westover
- In office 1654–1655
- Preceded by: William Whitby
- Succeeded by: Francis Moryson
- In office 1644–1645
- Preceded by: Thomas Stegg
- Succeeded by: Edmund Scarborough

Member of the Virginia Governor's Council
- In office 1660-1663

Member of the Virginia House of Burgesses representing Charles City County, Virginia
- In office 1659–1659 Serving with Warham Horsmenden
- Preceded by: Robert Wynne
- Succeeded by: Robert Wynne
- In office 1654–1655 Serving with Stephen Hamlin, Henry Perry, Abraham Wood, John Holmewood
- Preceded by: John Bushopp
- Succeeded by: Daniel Lluellin

Member of the Virginia Governor's Council
- In office 1651

Member of the Virginia House of Burgesses representing Charles City County, Virginia
- In office 1647–1652 Serving with Francis Poythers, Charles Sparrow, John Bushoppe
- Preceded by: Daniel Lluellin
- Succeeded by: Daniel Llewellin
- In office Nov. 20, 1645 – March 1, 1646 Serving with William Barker, Francis Eppes, Rice Hooe, Edward Prince, Charles Sparrow, Anthony Wyatt
- Preceded by: Thomas Stegg
- Succeeded by: Daniel Lluellin
- In office 1640–1642 Serving with Francis Eppes, Joseph Johnson, Thomas Pawlett, Walter Chiles, Walter Aston
- Preceded by: position created
- Succeeded by: Thomas Stegg

Personal details
- Born: before 1619
- Died: c. 1662
- Children: Edward Hill, Jr.
- Occupation: Planter, soldier

Colonel Edward Hill (d. c. 1662) was a Virginia planter, soldier and politician. In addition to representing Charles City County for many terms in the House of Burgesses, fellow members three times selected him as its Speaker (1644–45, 1654–55, and 1659), and he sat in the Virginia Governor's Council in 1651 as well as from 1660 to 1663. Burgesses also sent Hill to Maryland to put down Richard Ingle's 1646 rebellion, and he acted as the colony's temporary governor, but later contested nonpayment of monies promised to him and Virginia militia troops for that action. Col. Hill also led a militia with Pamunkey Native Americans against other tribes in Hanover County in 1656, with less success.

== Early and family life ==
Coat of Arms of Edward Hill

This man's origins are uncertain, although modern genealogists consider him the son of "Master Edward Hill" of Elizabeth City County who distinguished himself defending his home (and 100 acres of farmed land) against Native Americans in the uprising of 1622, and who was buried on May 15, 1624. That Edward Hill's widow, the former Hannah Boyle (1602-1659), survived two subsequent husbands. This man thus had several step-relatives on the Eastern Shore, even if he inherited property in several different counties by primogeniture from his father. His full sister Elizabeth reached adulthood and married William Pindley. Hannah Hill next married neighbor Thomas Spellman (who helped settle Edward Hill's estate but himself died by March 1627, leaving his property in England to their daughter Mary, and his Virginia property to his widow). Her third husband, Alexander Mountney (an ancient planter who had arrived in the Virginia colony in 1610, sold Elizabeth City property in 1633/1634 and moved to Accomack County by 1635, when he became a vestryman of that Accomac County parish.), but died by February 1644. In 1655, Hannah Mountney stated in a deposition that she was about 53 years old, and in 1657/8, she and Edwin Connaway patented 1659 acres in Lancaster County on Virginia's Northern Neck. Hannah may have borne another two sons and daughters by her third husband, and was also named the executor of William Pindley's estate for his orphaned children. Hannah Mountney's estate was ultimately administered by William Crompe "her son in law," who moved to Talbot County, Maryland.

== Career ==
Hill established Shirley Plantation in Charles City County by 1638. Two years later he was a tobacco viewer for the county, and 1660 he patented nearly 2500 acres in the county which became part of the plantation.

In 1640, Hill first represented Charles City County in the House of Burgesses, alongside Francis Eppes, Joseph Johnson, and Thomas Pawlett. In that session, as with previous sessions, the assembly had a clerk (Richard Lee) but no Speaker. Hill continued to represent Charles City County in the House of Burgesses in 1642, this time alongside Walter Aston and Walter Chiles, as well as Joseph Johnson. However, he was not among the county's three representatives (Walter Aston, Walter Chiles and Thomas Stegg) in 1643, when burgesses elected Thomas Stegg as the legislature's first Speaker. In 1644, Hill succeeded Stegg as the Speaker. At that 1644 assembly, Hill represented Charles City County alongside John Bishop, Francis Poythress and John Westropp, and the following year continued as Speaker, but represented the county alongside Rice Hooe, Francis Poythress and Edward Prince. The Grand Assembly of 1645-1646 did not re-elect Hill as Speaker, instead selecting Edmund Scarborough, although Hill did represent Charles City County, this time alongside Francis Eppes, Rice Hooe, Edward Prince, William Barker, Charles Sparrow and Anthony Wyatt. In 1646, Hill was not one of Charles City County's two representatives in the House of Burgesses (they being Rice Hooe, and Daniel Lluellin), presumably because of his activities in Maryland described below.

In March 1645, the assembly ordered Captain Hill and Captain Charles Willoughby to take troops to Maryland to capture and return some Virginians who remained there without permission. While there, Hill acted as Maryland's governor, and he remained in Maryland and in that office for several months. He had a commission dated July 30, 1646 which had a signature purportedly of Gov. Charles Calvert, but without proof that the governor actually signed it. On January 18, 1646, Hill wrote Leonard Calvert from Northumberland County (on Virginia's Eastern Shore) requesting "sallary in that unhappy service", and Maryland Governor Thomas Greene replied that Hill's demands should be satisfied. By the year's end, Governor Calvert, in command of a small body of troops, recaptured the Maryland capitol in Annapolis and reinstated himself in the government, which prompted Hill to surrender and return to Virginia. Nonetheless, Calvert died, prompting the executor of his estate, Lady Margaret Brent to liquidate part of his estate to secure the departure of Hill and his troops. Thus in August 1647, Mr. Broadhurst declared "there is now no governor in Maryland, for Captain Hill is governor, and him only he acknowledged." Captain Hill attended a meeting of the Maryland governor's council on June 10, 1648, and demanded payment of the money promised him by Leonard Calvert as governor, namely half of the Governor's receipts for 1646, as well as half the customs duties collected that year. On August 26, 1649, Lord Baltimore responded by declaring that in 1646 Hill was only his pretended lieutenant in that province and that Lord Baltimore had never fully authorized that payment.

In 1649, Hill then resumed his seat in the House of Burgesses, again representing Charles City County, this time alongside Charles Sparrow. Burgesses elected Thomas Harwood as their Speaker and John Corker as their clerk, since former clerk John Carter was representing "Nansimum" county in that assembly. However, in 1650, the Virginia Governor's Council summoned Hill to explain the authority under which he had collected fifty men to accompany him on an expedition to land west of the fall line of either the James, Rappahannock, or Potomac river, "with the avowed intention of finding gold or silver in these parts." The next assembly at which Charles City County was represented was from April 26 til May 6, 1652, and Hill not only represented the county alongside John Bushopp, but again became its Speaker, with John Corker continuing as clerk. However, Hill's election as Speaker prompted former Henrico burgess William Hatcher to complain to the Governor and Council that Hill was an atheist and blasphemer, since similar charges in the Quarter Court had been dismissed. Not only did the burgesses clear Hill of that charge, they forced Hatcher to on bended knee before the bar of the House to acknowledge his offense against Hill and the Burgesses, similar to the practice in the House of Commons. In late 1654, Hill again not only represented Charles City County (alongside Stephen Hamlin, Henry Perry and Abraham Wood), but the Burgesses again elected him Speaker, this time with Charles Norwood elected as the clerk. On March 31, 1654, Hill had also begun serving on the governor's advisory council (normally a lifetime appointment, to what later became the legislature's upper house).

About a year later, in March 1655, the Virginia Governor's Council ordered that Hill be given command of at least 100 men and sent to remove some 600 or 700 Native Americans from the colony's west and inland regions, particularly those who had traveled down from the mountains the previous year and settled near the falls of the James River (which later became the city of Richmond, Virginia). Hill then became commander in chief of the militias of Henrico and Charles City Counties, and led a force of 100 colonists and 100 Pamunkey Native Americans (mostly from what became New Kent County). The military action became the last of the great battles between the Richahecrians, Tutelo and Manahoac on one side and the Pamunkey on the other. One of the many Native American casualties when Hill removed his troops from the battlefield was Tottopottomoy, the chief of his Pamunkey allies. The burgesses demanded a report from Colonel Hill, and suspended him from all civil and military offices pending investigation. However, authorities seemed satisfied with his response, for in April 1658, Hill again sat on the Governor's Council, and in March 1659, again became Speaker of the House of Burgesses, as well as one of the two members representing Charles City County (the other being Warham Horsmenden).

== Personal life ==
Hill married and had children, although as with his birth origin, the identity of his wife and most children is unproven. He clearly was the father of son Edward Hill, Jr., who inherited Shirley Plantation, as well as married and had children, including Edward Hill III who like his father and grandfather served as a burgess and lived at the plantation. On August 5, 1658, an Edward Hill and his wife Elizabeth conveyed a lot in Jamestown (the colonial capital, where members of the council were supposed to have living space) to Walter Chiles II. This original Edward Hill may have married or remarried a woman originally named Hannah Jordan (widow of burgess Walter Aston who had represented Shirley Hundred Island or related entities most years between 1630 and 1643; Aston or a namesake son died in 1656). Edward and Hannah Hill may also have had a son named Thomas and daughters Hannah and Mary since several people with the Hill surname lived in Charles City County before 1700. In the winter of 1661/2, Edward Hill Jr. had a land/dower dispute with his mother or stepmother Hannah Hill, which indicates his father's death, and an October 1663 court notation indicated she was too ill to appear in court or surrender the land.

== Death and legacy ==
Hill died, probably in what we now consider the early months of 1662, although his place of death and burial have been lost. In 1663, he was finally paid for procuring powder and shot for the colony. His son, Edward Hill, Jr. continued both the family's political involvement representing Charles City County in the House of Burgesses, and served one term as its Speaker, as well as cultivated Shirley Plantation and other vast landed estates.

Shirley Plantation remains today, as one of the Commonwealth's longest operating plantations, and is on the National Register of Historic Places. Upper Shirley Vineyard, immediately adjacent to the plantation house, on what had been the same property during Edward Hill's lifetime (and that of many of his descendants) has tasting rooms open to the public, including on days that the plantation house is closed to the public. Cockacoeske, Totopotomoy's widow, reminded the Virginia General Assembly of her husband's death in 1676 when they again requested assistance during Bacon's Rebellion. The National Park Service administers a battlefield named "Totopotomoy Creek" near Mechanicsville on the outskirts of Richmond, but as the site of a battle in May 1864, not 1656.
