= Matthew Edloe Jr. (burgess) =

Politician of The Colony of Virginia

Matthew Edloe

Member of the House of Burgesses for James City County
- In office 1659–1660 Serving with Walter Chiles, Thomas Foulke, William Whittacre
- Preceded by: William Corker
- Succeeded by: Robert Ellison

Personal details
- Born: c. 1615 England
- Died: 1668 Charles City County, Colony of Virginia
- Resting place: unknown
- Spouse: Tabitha Minge
- Children: John
- Relatives: Mathew Edloe Sr. (father)

Mathew Edloe or Edlowe (c. 1615 – 1668) was a planter and politician who served a term as burgess representing James City County in the House of Burgesses.

== Early and family life ==
His father, also Mathew Edloe, had emigrated to the Virginia colony in 1618, and in 1629 served as one of the burgesses representing (the short-lived) "Plantation of the College" district alongside Thomas Osborne. This boy was probably born to his father's first wife, for his father did not marry Alice, the widow of Luke Boyse (who had represented "The Necke of Land" district in the House of Burgesses in both 1624 and 1625), for about a decade, and they jointly submitted an account of her late husband's estate in 1629. The elder Mathew Edloe died before 1635.

== Career ==
Upon reaching legal age (generally 21 years old), in 1637, this man patented 1200 acres in then developing and vast Charles City County. He also owned (probably inheriting his father's) land in James City County near the colony's capital. Edloe became captain and later lieutenant colonel of the James City County militia.

James City County voters elected Edloe as one of their four representatives to the House of Burgesses in 1659, refusing to re-elect any of the previous year's four representatives (including future Speaker Henry Soane), and Edloe served a single term alongside Walter Chiles Jr. (the son of former Speaker Walter Chiles and the only one of the four to win re-election) as well as Thomas Foulke and William Whittaker.

== Personal life, death and controversy ==
Edloe had died by 1668. Earlier, he had married a widow named Tabitha who had at least a previous daughter, and who bore a son John of this marriage (who was significantly younger than legal age at the time), as well as remarried again. By 1671, Robert Wynne had been names as John Edloe's guardian, after complaints had been made that a later husband of Edloe's widow was not managing those lands for the boy's benefit. The husband of John's elder half-sister contested the guardianship, arguing that he deserved to be guardian, but the general court ruled that because he (really his wife) would inherit the father's estate should young John die, he was ineligible to serve as the boy's guardian. Young John Edloe married and had children before dying circa 1705, and the land he owned came to be in Henrico County (which had been formed from then-vast Charles City County, whose records were destroyed in the Civil War).
