= William Hatcher =

William Hatcher may refer to:

- William Hatcher (politician), Colonial American politician
- William S. Hatcher (1935–2005), American mathematician
- Will Hatcher (William Da Corean Hatcher), American basketball player
