= Edmund Jenings (governor) =

English lawyer and colonial administrator

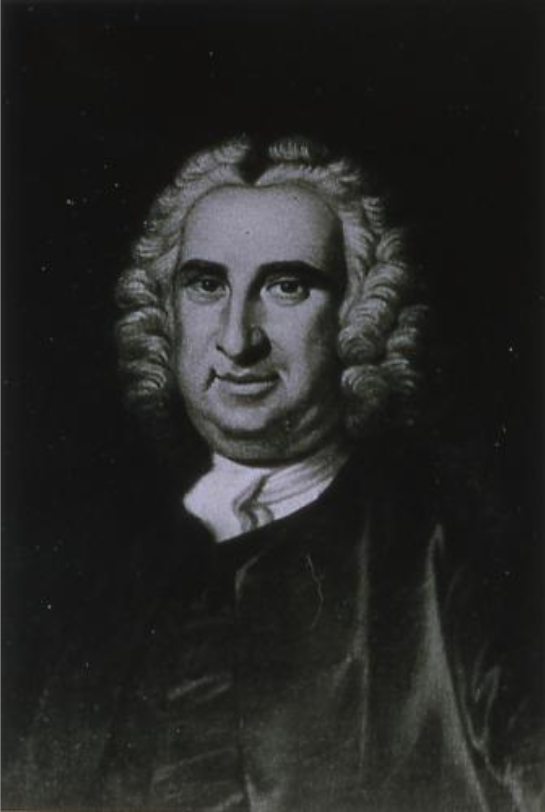
- Edmund Jenings portrait by Godfrey Kneller

Acting Royal Governor of Virginia
- In office 1706-1710
- Monarch: Anne
- Preceded by: Edward Nott
- Succeeded by: Robert Hunter

Member of the Virginia Governor's Council
- In office 1691-1726

Attorney General for the Virginia colony
- In office 1680–1691
- Preceded by: Edward Hill
- Succeeded by: Edward Chilton

Personal details
- Born: 1659 Ripon, Yorkshire, England
- Died: July 5, 1727 (aged 67–68) Williamsburg, Virginia
- Spouse: Frances Corbin (ca 1688 - 1713, her death)
- Relatives: Sir Edmund Jenings (father); Edmund Jr. (son)
- Occupation: Politician

Edmund Jenings (1659 – July 5, 1727) was an English lawyer and colonial administrator who held important posts in the colony of Virginia including as the attorney general, on the Governor's Council and as acting governor, but encountered controversy and experienced financial problems in his final years.

== Early life and education ==
His father Sir Edmund Jenings was a barrister and Member of Parliament from Ripon in Yorkshire, England. In the 16th century, the Jenings men had traditionally worked as stewards for the Barons Clifford and Earl of Cumberland. His mother Margaret was the daughter of Sir Edward Barkham, 1st Baronet, of South Acre, and wife Frances Berney, and granddaughter of Sir Edward Barkham, a merchant who became the lord mayor of London in 1621-1622, and wife Jane Crouch. Edmund was their third son. His elder brother Jonathan became M.P. for Ripon, and this Edmund named his Virginia plantation "Ripon Hall". His great-grandfather Peter Jenings who died in 1651 in Silsden, Yorkshire, England was the brother of William Jenings of Silsden, whose son Capt. Peter Jenings (1630-1672) was the second attorney general for the Virginia colony (in 1670-1671). The Silsden Peter Jenings had three sons but both elder sons (Peter and Edmund) died unmarried and without children, in 1623 and 1624. This Edmund was descended from the third son, Jonathan, who was a barrister and who died in 1649, shortly before his father.

== Career ==
Emigrating to Virginia when perhaps 20 years old, Jenings settled in York County near the colonial capital (which moved from Jamestown to Williamsburg during his service as discussed below). Appointed the colony's attorney general in 1680 (accounts differ as to whether Jenings arrived with a commission from England or a simple letter of introduction), he continued to serve until at least 1691 and possibly until 1700, with interruptions, as discussed below. Appointed to the Virginia Governor's Council in 1681, Jenings may have continued to serve until shortly before his death, although some scholars believe he was deposed during trips to England, and he was clearly involved in controversies during his final years.

=== Colonial officer to governor ===
As attorney general, one of Jening's responsibilities remained resolving the aftermath of Bacon's Rebellion, nearly a decade earlier. Jenings did so in part by not confiscating the estates of all former rebels after their deaths, but allowing them be left in the hands of their nearest relatives.

In 1684-1685 Jenings accompanied Col. William Byrd, Virginia Governor Lord Howard of Effingham, New York Governor Col. Thomas Dongan, Ralph Wormeley Jr., Stevens V. Courtland, John Spragg, and magistrates from Albany, New York to negotiate with the Seneca. This negotiation helped secure a treaty with the Senecas and other northern tribes. In 1696, when Wormeley was having difficulties fulfilling his duties as the colony's secretary of state, Jenings was named his deputy. On January 1, 1702, the King's Council formally named Jenings as the Colony's Secretary. But it was not until Wormeley's death that Jenings presented his commission to the Virginia governor's council, on June 20, 1702. The following year he was given leave to go to England a second time, and as in the two previous years, petitioned the House of Burgesses to receive the commissions owed him for issuing appointments as that job required. William Cocke received the royal warrant as the colonial secretary in 1712, but when Cocke died in 1720, Jenings again was appointed the colony's secretary, this time by Lt. Gov. Alexander Spotswood.

Jenings may have become a member of the Governor's Council as early as 1684, but the next April the Council ruled that if Jenings was a member of that body, he had to resign as attorney general, and no evidence exists that he did so, and in fact received some payments for his legal work. The English government revised its colonial structure and in 1696 created the Board of Trade to handle colonial relations. About the same time, the House of Burgesses decided to move the colony's capital from Jamestown (notoriously unhealthy in summers) to Williamsburg, and Jenings clearly supervised much of the transition in 1699-1700, though the capacity in which he did so is unclear. Moreover, one of his legal jobs was to compile the colony's laws for transmission to the Board of Trade, and the Speaker of the House of Burgesses found the result inadequate in 1699, and so did not appoint Jenings to that committee until one of the original committeemen (Edward Hill) died. Thus, some accounts list Jenings as becoming a councilor in 1699 or 1701. Another controversy involved whether Jenings overstayed his leave during trips to England, particularly an extended trip in 1704-1705 in which he met with the Board of Trade in London, or another trip in 1711 in which he met with Lady Fairfax and was named as agent for the Northern Neck Proprietary (together with Thomas Lee replacing Robert Carter from 1713 to 1719).,

Meanwhile, as the member of the Governor's Council with longest service, Jenings eventually became President of the Council of Virginia. Thus when Col. Edward Nott died in office and his successor Col. Robert Hunter was captured at sea by the French, Jenings became the acting governor from August 1706 to June 1710, but declined a second term at the end of his life citing feeble health. Jenings did not call the House of Burgesses into session during his time as acting Governor, and showed little initiative before the arrival of Gov. Alexander Spotswood. In 1710, while lieutenant governor, Jenings became involved in a case involving two slaves who had organized a rebellion, and declared afterward that their execution "will strike such terror" in others not to rebel.

Jenings' most recent biographer details the factional strife in Virginia in the early 19th century, in which Jenings was perceived as too strenuously defending Gov. Francis Nicholson and part of a faction including Ralph Wormeley Jr. and Richard Lee II, and opposed by several powerful councilors, particularly Robert Carter, Rev. James Blair and Benjamin Harrison II. Furthermore, part of Jenings' second trip to England involved not only burying his wife, but setting the estate of an elder brother, which did not yield the money Jenings expected, and needed given his borrowing from the Northern Neck proprietary accounts. In any event, when Lady Fairfax died in May 1719, her executor (re) appointed Robert Carter as the new agent, and Carter soon charged Jenings with failing to transmit the quitrents due to the proprietor in England. John Carter his son then persuaded Jenings to mortgage his lands to raise the money due to Lord Fairfax, as he informed the proprietor in 1722. Two years later, Robert Carter wrote the Fairfax representative that all Jenings' land and slaves were mortgaged. When Robert Carter died, his will (dated in 1728, after this man's death) mentioned a judgment against Jenings by the General Court in chancery. In any event, several high-ranking Virginians accused Jenings of mental illness in his final year, so he may have resigned from the council in March 1725. Lt. Gov. Drysdale shortly after he announced that he was returning to England, formally removed Jenings from the council, on June 25, 1726. Thus, when Drysdale died on July 22, 1726, Robert Carter became the colony's acting governor for about a year.

=== Planter and land speculator ===
Jenings speculated in land in the Virginia colony, and also grew and shipped tobacco, using enslaved labor by at least his final years, although many records have been lost. Virginia's last colonial capital, Williamsburg, in whose platting this man had significant involvement, before becoming chartered as a town in its own right was split down main street between York County and James City County, Virginia. In 1686 Jenings was among the prominent men who asked to patent land on Pamunkey Neck (now in King William County) when such was legally available (a previous treaty with the Pamunkey having restricted resettlement), and the following year he purchased a mill on St. Andrews Creek in York County. In October 1691 Jenings patented 6,513 acres in Henrico County on Tuckahoe Creek and the James River. When the town of Yorktown was planned, about 12 miles downstream on the York River from Jenings's main Ripon Hall plantation, Jenings secured a town lot with building. The following year he was among the Council members ordered to build a house in Jamestown. In 1696 he and his wife sold land farmed by a tenant in Hampton parish (probably in Elizabeth City County. In 1706 Jenings was awarded 4,000 acres in King William County upstream of York County in recognition of his service to the crown. Thus that year Jenings paid taxes on 200 acres in James City County, 4000 acres in King William County and 1500 acres in York County.

=== Local offices ===
Among the local offices Jenings held were: the James City County sheriff in 1681, clerk of York County, one of the churchwarden of Bruton parish in 1691, and at some point probably in the early 1700s the commander in chief of the York County militia, with the rank of colonel. Jenings also grew and shipped large quantities of tobacco and was collector of customs for the James River's Upper District (which included Henrico County).

== Personal life ==
Edmund married Frances, the daughter of Henry Corbin of Buckingham House, and wife Alice Eltonhead, and had several children. Frances died in London in 1713 and is likely buried at St. Clement's Dane's. His son and grandson were also named "Edmund Jenings" and both returned to England before their deaths. Edmund Jenings Jr. (d. 1756) married the twice-widowed Adriana Vanderheyden Frisby Bordley (1690-1741), became a noted Maryland lawyer and politician who served in both houses of the Maryland legislature and had a primary residence in the state capital and properties in diverse areas including Baltimore and Prince George's and Charles counties (also serving as clerk of the latter). While his son Peter died before reaching adulthood, the other son Edmund Jenings III (1731-1819) (this man's grandson, and a daughter and her husband) returned to the mother country around the time of the American Revolutionary War, practiced at Lincoln's Inn and died in Yorkshire. Edmund Jenings III also traveled back to the colonies and presented a portrait of the Earl of Chatham to the Gentlemen of Westmoreland County, Virginia in 1769. This man's daughter, Elizabeth Jenings also returned to Yorkshire, and married Robert Porteus. He son (this man's grandson) was Beilby Porteus, Bishop of Chester and London. Two other daughters remained in Virginia: Frances, who married future burgess Charles Grymes, and Margaret, who married Issac Hill in 1708). Their brother William Jenings also moved to Maryland. His great-grandson (son of Edmund Jr.'s daughter also named Ariana) was Edmund Randolph, who became Governor of Virginia and the first Attorney General of the United States under George Washington. However, his relation to Thomas Jennings (1736-1796) who became Maryland's attorney general is unclear.

== Death and legacy ==
In early June 1726, John Randolph visited Jenings and found him suffering from a palsy, likely a stroke or Parkinson's disease, barely able to write, and composing his thoughts only with difficulty. However, when William Robertson as the council's clerk informed Jenings he was being removed for incompetence, Jenings resisted. Various accounts of Jenings' death place it in England on December 5, 1727 (which is unlikely given that Robert Carter of Virginia wrote the Board of Trade about the death on July 24, 1727), or at Ripon Hall on June 2 or July 5. He was buried at Bruton Parish Church, which he had helped build, and modern excavation of the worn tombstone indicates a date of "Ju-- 1727".

After Jenings' death, creditor Robert Carter I foreclosed on the mortgage and took over Jenings' main Ripon Hall plantation. Another major creditor was Thomas Corbin, his brother in law. A plaque commemorating Jenings was placed at Bruton Church in 1907, but neither his last will and testament nor other personal papers have survived.

Government offices
| Preceded by Edward Nott | Colonial Governor of Virginia; 1706-1708 | Succeeded by Robert Hunter |
