= Robert Wynne (Virginia politician) =

Virginia politician and landowner (1622–1675)

14th Speaker of the Virginia House of Burgesses
- In office 1662–1674
- Preceded by: Henry Soane
- Succeeded by: Augustine Warner Jr.

Representative from Charles City County in the Virginia House of Burgesses
- In office 1658–1675 Serving with Warham Horsmenden, Edward Hill, Theodorick Bland, Charles Sparrow, Stephen Hamelyn
- Preceded by: Abraham Wood
- Succeeded by: Edward Hill Jr.

Personal details
- Born: 1622 Canterbury, England
- Died: 1675 (aged 52–53) Virginia
- Spouse: Mary Poythress
- Children: sons Thomas and Joshua, daughter
- Occupation: Planter, politician

Robert Wynne (1622–1675) was a Virginia politician and landowner, who had the second longest tenure of any Speaker of the House of Burgesses, having been elected by his fellows during the Colony's "Long Parliament" as well as represented Charles City County from 1658 until his death in 1675 (as Bacon's Rebellion was beginning).

== Early life ==
Wynne was born in Canterbury, England, being baptized there on December 22, 1622. His grandfather, also Robert Wynne, had been mayor of Canterbury in 1599, and other relatives had served in Parliament.

== Career ==
After emigrating to the Virginia colony during its tobacco boom as well as military skirmishes with the Dutch, Wynne settled in Charles City County, Virginia by early 1656, though he may have arrived in Virginia earlier during the English Civil Wars. Wynne became one of the county's justices of the peace, which jointly administered counties in that era, though he was fined for poor attendance in September 1659. He also did not serve as a burgess in that year's assembly, though he did the years before and after. By 1671, Wynne also served as guardian for John Edloe, the son of former burgess Matthew Edloe of nearby James City County, after complaints had been made that a later husband of Edloe's widow was not managing those lands for the boy's benefit.

Governor Sir William Berkeley convened the House of Burgesses in 1661 and did not dissolve it and convene another session until 1676 (after Bacon's Rebellion began). Thus the same legislature (albeit with some replacements after resignations or deaths) met in seventeen sessions during that period. At the Long Parliament's second session in 1662, members elected Wynne as their Speaker to replace Henry Soane, who had died during that first recess. Under Wynne's leadership, the House took an active role in business previously left to the Governor and Council, creating a standing committee to advise the Governor between sessions. Fellow burgesses elected Augustine Warner Jr. as their speaker, replacing Wynne, in the 1674 session.

== Personal life ==
He married Mary, the widow of former Charles City County burgess Francis Poythress, who had already borne children (including a son named Francis Poythress (d. 1688)) with her first husband. She also bore children of this second marriage, including at least two sons and a daughter.

== Death and legacy ==
Wynne died in 1675; his will was dated July 1. That will admitted to probate mentioned a daughter who had married George Woodliffe and had a grandson named after that son-in-law.

== See also ==
- Hugh Gwyn (c. 1590-1654)
