= Edward Major =

Virginia soldier, landowner and politician

6th Speaker of the Virginia House of Burgesses
- In office 1652–1652
- Preceded by: Thomas Harwood
- Succeeded by: Thomas Dew

Member of the House of Burgesses representing Nansemond County, Virginia
- In office 1652-1653 Serving with Thomas Dew, Peter Montague
- Preceded by: Toby Smith
- Succeeded by: Samuel Stoughton
- In office 1646 Serving with Samuel Stoughton
- Preceded by: position created
- Succeeded by: Moore Fauntlaroy

Member of the House of Burgesses representing Upper Norfolk County
- In office 1645-46 Serving with Philip Bennett, Richard Wells
- Preceded by: position created
- Succeeded by: Thomas Davis

Personal details
- Born: 1615 England
- Died: c. 1655 (aged 39–40) Nansemond County, Virginia
- Spouse(s): Martha (d. 1650); Susannah Alston
- Children: Edward, Robert, William, Martha
- Occupation: Farmer, politician, military officer

Military service
- Branch/service: Virginia militia
- Rank: Lt. Colonel

Edward Major (1615 – c. 1655) was an English religious dissenter who emigrated to the Virginia where he became a planter, military officer and politician who represented the area variously called Upper Norfolk County or Nansemond County and became Speaker of the Virginia House of Burgesses.

== Early life ==
Major was born in England around 1615, and dissented from the ruling Church of England, probably aligning with the Puritan sect. Complicating matters, as explicated by genealogist James Branch Cabell a century ago, other men of the same name lived in Virginia during his lifetime, particularly Edward Major who lived in Accomack County, on Virginia's Eastern Shore, bore sons named Thomas, John and Richard and died before 1645.

== Career ==
Major sailed on the Bonaventure to the Colony of Virginia, landing in January, 1635. He was listed as a headright by Robert Bennett, brother of future Virginia Governor Richard Bennett, who would represent Parliament's interests in negotiations with the Virginia Colony before it accepted Parliamentary leadership during the English Civil War.

Major briefly lived in Charles River County (and his son William would inherit land in that county) but settled to the south near the Nansemond River, where other Puritans had settled. In May 1637 Major patented 450 acres near the land of burgess Daniel Gookin (based on his own emigration and that of eight other people), and renewed that patent while also adding another 50 acres for another headright in 1646. In September 1645 he also patented 300 acres in Warwick County.

Major became a prominent farmer as well as militia leader in what was sometimes called Upper Norfolk County or Nansemond County. The Nansemond Puritans went so far in 1642 as to write the Governor of the Massachusetts colony, John Winthrop, asking for clergy, and three clergymen soon arrived, to the great displeasure of Virginia Governor William Berkeley, who ordered them to leave (Some Puritans later blamed that edit for the Native American uprising of 1644). Circa 1648, during his absence from the legislature as noted below, Major probably also helped Richard Bennett to establish the Puritan settlement in Maryland. In any event, Governor Richard Bennett, sympathetic to the religious nonconformists, named Major Lieutenant Colonel of the Nansemond militia in 1653.

Whether titled of Nansemond, Nanzimond or Upper Norfolk County, local voters at least five times elected Major as one of the men representing them in the House of Burgesses. The first occasion was in 1645, when the county received an additional seat in the House of Burgesses, and Major won re-election once despite the number of burgesses representing the county again becoming two. A similar legislative increase in 1653 also led to Major's addition as a burgess, but he also served in the first of two 1652 sessions in which Nansemond only had two burgesses in the assembly' lower house. In one of the 1652 sessions, Virginia's assembly recognized Parliamentary control of the British government and acceded to its governance of the colony.

Major was closely associated with Puritan settlers in the colony, and was elected Speaker of the House of Burgesses in 1652, just after Virginia acceded to the authority of Parliament following the execution of King Charles I. His successor as speaker in the other 1652 session, was Nansemond's other burgess, and fellow religious nonconformist Thomas Dew. James Branch Cabell believed that Governor Bennett ousted Speaker Walter Chiles in 1653 in order to assist in Major's election, which did not occur (burgesses instead electingWilliam Whitby, either because Major was already ill, or because Major was considered too radical).

== Personal life ==
Major married twice. He survived his first wife, Martha Butler (1614-1650), who bore three sons (Edward, Robert and William) and a daughter (Martha Buckner) who survived their parents and were named in this man's last will and testament. The widower remarried to Susannah Aston, daughter of Lt. Col. Walter Aston (and possibly the widow of Humphrey Leisher), who survived him, but did not bear his children.

== Death and legacy ==
Major wrote his last will and testament in November 1652, and it was admitted to probate in February 1655. It divided his land mostly among his sons, with Edward Jr. inheriting in Nansemond County, William in York County, and Robert in Warwick County.

His widow Susannah had remarried, to William Batt (or Batte) by December 4, 1656.
