= Thomas Dew =

Thomas Dew may refer to:

- Thomas Roderick Dew (1802–1846), American educator and writer
- Thomas Dew (politician) (died c. 1681), Virginia landowner and politician
