= Francis Moryson =

American politician

Lt. Governor of Virginia
- In office April 1661 – 1662
- Preceded by: William Berkeley
- Succeeded by: William Berkeley

10th Speaker of the Virginia House of Burgesses
- In office 1656–1656
- Preceded by: Edward Hill, Sr.
- Succeeded by: John Smith

Member of the Virginia House of Burgesses for James City County
- In office 1656–1656 Serving with Robert Ellyson, John Flood, Robert Holt, Theophilus Hone, George Lobb, William Whittaker
- Preceded by: Henry Soane
- Succeeded by: Henry Soane

Personal details
- Born: before 1628 England
- Died: 1680/81 England
- Spouse: Cecilia
- Relatives: Richard Moryson (father)

Francis Moryson (bef. 1628–1680/81) was an English soldier who became a Virginia colonial official and agent. A Royalist in the English Civil War, he emigrated to the Virginia Colony, where he held several posts before returning to England and becoming the colony's agent, and finally briefly served on the commission investigating Bacon's Rebellion.

== Early and family life ==
His father Sir Richard Moryson (c.1571-1628) had been lieutenant general of the ordnance for King James, as well as a member of Parliament for Leicester in 1621. His mother Elizabeth Harrington, was the daughter of Sir Henry Harrington. He had at least two brothers, Richard and Robert Moryson, and a sister, Letitia, who married Lucius Cary, Lord Falkland. He married Cecelia, sister of Giles Rawlins, and both she and their son Henry survived him.

== Career ==
Coat of Arms of Francis Moryson

A Cavalier refugee, Major Moryson emigrated to Virginia in 1649 around the time of the execution of Charles I, sailing on The Virginia Merchant in September alongside Col. Henry Norwood and Majors Richard Fox and Francis Cary. However, their vessel ran aground off Cape Hatteras during a November storm. Rather than deposit the passengers at Jamestown, the colony's capital as planned, the ship's crew left them on a small island in Assateague Bay on the Eastern Shore, where they nearly starved, as Norwood later recalled in a book. Native Americans discovered the party, nursed them to health, and a Virginia fur trader, Jenkin Price, transported them first to Northampton County and then to George Ludlow's York County home. Finally Ralph Wormeley brought Moryson to Jamestown, where Moryson became the guest of Governor Sir William Berkeley. When The Virginia Merchant had grounded again in the James River, Berkeley had ordered a search for Moryson's party, possibly because they may have carried a payment of 1000 pounds from Edmund Custis. Moryson may have also stayed with relatives, for his brother Richard, who died in 1648, had for a decade served as commander of Fort Point Comfort, and left a plantation nearby. Richard's widow twice claimed Francis as a headright in 1650. Another brother, Robert Moryson, also later commanded the fort, as would Robert's son Charles Moryson after this man returned to England. In 1654, Francis Moryson bought 24 acres near Jamestown, and the following year leased 120 acres on the James River.

Voters in James City County elected Moryson as one of their delegates to the House of Burgesses, and fellow burgesses elected him as their Speaker in 1656. By March 1656, Moryson probably moved to Jamestown, the assembly having purchased a house there from Berkeley as a residence for their Speaker. They also voted Moryson 6,000 pounds of tobacco for the time and care he was devoting to the public business. As Speaker, Moryson wrote a letter to Oliver Cromwell, and another to Secretary of State ,John Thurlow, supporting Edward Digges, Samuel Mathews Sr., and Richard Bennett as the Virginia colony's agents in England in a continuing boundary dispute with the Maryland Colony. When the late Speaker William Whitby's widow Katherine returned to England in 1657, the Lancaster County Court named Moryson as guardian of her three young brothers, who remained in Virginia.

When Berkeley began his second term in 1660, Moryson received an appointment to the Governor's Council, which the king's commission approved by July. Two years later, he became the commander of the fort at Point Comfort, the post his brothers had previously held. Moryson also became the colony's acting Governor when Berkeley left for England on April 30, 1661. Moryson remained the colony's acting governor through 1662, and in addition to seeking peace with the local Native Americans, he also supervised revision and publication of The Lawes of Virginia Now in Force (London 1662), which had a provision which proved problematic that allowed parish vestries to fill their own vacancies, rather than allow such to be chosen by parishioners. Before leaving to England in March 1663, Moryson also donated a silver communion service to the church at Jamestown.

Moryson returned to his wife and home in Bishop's Waltham, Hampshire, in 1663, with his nephew Charles succeeding him as commander at Point Comfort. Morison then acted as the Virginia colony's English agent for a 200 pound sterling annual salary, with particular directions to protest against the grant of the Northern Neck Proprietary to royal favorites. Moryson secured a charter for the Virginia colony before his final (and brief) trip back in 1677. He was a member of the royal commission investigating Bacon's Rebellion, which had destroyed the colonial capital at Jamestown. The report proved critical of Berkeley's management.

== Death and legacy ==
Moryson died in 1680 or 1681 in Bishop's Waltham. By 1699, his son Henry was colonel of the Colstream Foot Guards. His silver communion service remains, occasionally used by historic Bruton Parish Church in Williamsburg.
