= William A.G. Dade =

Virginia politician, judge and landowner

Virginia judge for the 3rd judicial circuit
- In office May 1813 – October 15, 1829

Member of the Virginia State Senate for Fairfax and Prince William Counties
- In office November 30, 1812 – May 25, 1813
- Preceded by: William Tyler
- Succeeded by: J. Gibson

Member of the Virginia House of Delegates for Prince William County, Virginia
- In office December 7, 1807 – 1808 Serving with Stephen French
- Preceded by: Gerard Alexander
- Succeeded by: John H. Peyton

Personal details
- Born: circa 1782 Stafford County, Virginia
- Died: October 15, 182 Clover Hill plantation, Prince William County, Virginia
- Resting place: Effingham plantation, Prince William County, Virginia
- Spouse: Elizabeth Westwood James
- Children: daughter, 3 sons
- Occupation: attorney, judge

William Alexander Gibbons Dade (Circa 1782 – October 15, 1832), was a Virginia planter, lawyer, judge and politician who briefly served in both houses of the Virginia General Assembly before becoming a judge for the Northern Neck of Virginia circuit.

== Early life and education ==
Born to the former Sarah Ashton and her husband Col. Langhorne Dade (b. 1755) shortly after the conclusion of the Revolutionary War, William A.G. Dade could trace his descent to a 17th century English Royalist Francis Dade who emigrated to Virginia and became Speaker of the House of Burgesses, as well as major of the Westmoreland County militia before the creation of most of the counties where this man would hold judicial responsibilities. His paternal grandfather was Horatio Dade (1724-1782). Several cousins fought for the patriot cause, including Captain Francis Dade and Baldwin Dade, both of whom served in the 3rd Continental Light Dragoons. Furthermore, his cousin Cadwallader Dade served in the House of Delegates representing King George County during the War of 1812 and Lawrence Taliaferro Dade served in the 2nd Virginia Artillery in that conflict and later and served in the Senate of Virginia, 1819-1832. His planter father sympathized with the patriot cause during the American Revolutionary War. William A.G. Dade received a private education appropriate to his class, and read law with a local lawyer.

== Career ==
Admitted to the bar by 1805, Dade would practice in Prince William County, Virginia and adjoining counties, initially living in Dumfries before the port silted up, then moving inland to near Brent Town when the county seat moved. In June 1805, local judges appointed Dade as Commonwealth's attorney (prosecutor), and he continued to hold that public office until he was elected judge as described below. Dade owned 3 slaves in the 1810 federal census (shortly before his father's death), and eight slaves a decade later (including a boy and girl younger than 14 years old).

Prince William County voters elected Dade as one of the men representing them in the Virginia House of Delegates in 1807, and he was succeeded by his investor partner John Howe Peyton, who had a much longer political career, albeit mostly after moving to Augusta County, Virginia. In 1812, Dade was elected to the Virginia State Senate but did not serve a full term. Fellow legislators elected him as judge for the Third Judicial District, which included Tidewater counties formerly part of the Northern Neck Proprietary, spanning from Prince William, Stafford, and Fairfax Counties to Westmoreland and King George Counties. Judge Dade continued to serve in this position until his death.

Interested in promoting education, and as a father with children, Dade served as trustee for the new academy established in Dumfries before the town's decline. He also gathered a library of more than 400 volumes, mostly on legal topics. In 1818 the General Assembly appointed Dade as one of the six men authorized to determine the location of the University of Virginia. Other committee members included former Virginia governor and U.S. President, Thomas Jefferson, and former U.S. President James Madison. When the school was organized, Jefferson offered Dade a position as professor of law, but Dade declined, citing the personal sacrifices that would be required of him, given that he had been "tolerably well established" in his career.

When the Virginia General Assembly decided to call a convention to revise the state constitution, Dade received the most votes among candidate in the large district approximating that for his judicial duties. However, he grew ill and did not travel to Richmond to attend what became the Virginia Constitutional Convention of 1829-1830. Instead, he resigned on the day the convention opened, October 5, 1829. A week later, the other three delegates for the district chose Alexander F. Rose as his replacement.

Dade was also a planter, like his father, and, together with John H. Peyton, invested in mortgages. He came to own about 1,000 acres in Prince William County, which he farmed using enslaved labor. Dade raised wheat as well as cattle, sheep, hogs, and horses, and he owned more than 40 slaves by the time of his death.

== Personal life ==
By May 1809, Dade married Elizabeth Westwood James. They had a daughter and three sons. The eldest son, Charles Edward Dade, inherited the main plantation (by the terms of his will rather than primogeniture which had been abolished.

== Death and legacy ==
Judge Dade died on October 15, 1829, at his Clover Hill plantation. He was buried at Effingham plantation, the traditional graveyard of the members of the Alexander family. His house in the old Brent town section, which was bought by James Nokes in 1859, was in ruins except for a stone meat house for many years before being destroyed by fire in the 1920s.
