= Francis Dade (politician) =

Virginia politician and landowner

Major Francis Dade a/k/a John Smith

11th Speaker of the Virginia House of Burgesses
- In office 1658–1658
- Preceded by: Francis Moryson
- Succeeded by: Edward Hill, Sr.

Member of the Virginia House of Burgesses for Warwick County, Virginia
- In office 1658–1658 Serving with Thomas Davis
- Preceded by: n/a
- Succeeded by: n/a

Personal details
- Born: Francis Dade; 1621 England
- Died: 1662 or 1663 At sea
- Spouse: Beheathland Bernard
- Children: Francis Dade II
- Occupation: merchant, soldier, planter

Military service
- Rank: Major
- Unit: Militia of Westmoreland County, Virginia

Francis Dade (1621 – May 1, 1662), was a Virginia soldier, politician and landowner. An English Royalist who emigrated to Virginia some time after the death of Charles I. In Virginia he officially used the name "John Smith" when he served as one of the two delegates representing tiny Warwick County and as Speaker of the Virginia House of Burgesses in 1658. He died at sea in 1662 or 1663.

== Early and family life ==
Coat of Arms of Francis Dade

The seventh son of William Dade, Esq. (1579 - February 22, 1660), Francis immigrated from Tannington, county Suffolk, England and settled in Virginia about 1650. He used the name "John Smith", so historians believe he was involved in some royalist plot against Oliver Cromwell.

Smith/Dade married Behethland Bernard, daughter of Captain Thomas Bernard, who thrice served as Burgess for Warwick County in the 1640s. Her grandfather was Capt. Robert Behethland. Francis and Behethland had one son, Francis Dade II (d. 1698), who married Frances Townshend, one of the co-heiresses of Col. Robert Townshend. They had sons (Robert) Townshend, Cadwallader and Francis Dade III. Either Francis II or his father bought 1300 acres next to Robert Townshend's patent in then-vast Northumberland County. They also had two daughters: Anne who married William Lane, and Mary who married Capt. Robert Massey then Col. Rice Hooe. Frances Townshend Dade's parents were from Northumberland County, England, her grandfather being Needham Langhorne and her brother was Sir William Langhorne (hence another unusual first name used in later generations). Francis II' grandson Horatio Dade served on the King George County Committee of Safety during the American Revolutionary War and Horatio's son Townshend Dade served as that county's sheriff and much later represented King George county in the Virginia House of Delegates, as well as like his father and uncle Cadwallader helped supply Patriot troops. Confusion may result from males of various generations sharing the name "Townshend Dade", including one Rev. Townshend Dade who was subjected to a trial in Albemarle County for misconduct. Two grandsons of Francis Dade II and his wife Frances served in the 3rd Continental Light Dragoons during the conflict: Baldwin Dade and Captain Francis Dade (IV). During the War of 1812, grandsons Townshend and Cadwallader Dade served in the Virginia General Assembly representing King George County. Great-grandson General Lawrence Taliaferro Dade served in the 2nd Virginia Artillery during the War of 1812, then in the Senate of Virginia, 1819–1832. Another great-great-grandson, William A.G. Dade served briefly in both houses of the Virginia General Assembly representing Prince William County and Fairfax County, Virginia, and then served for decades as a judge for most of the Northern Neck before dying early in the Virginia Constitutional Convention of 1829–1830. Francis Dade II's great-great-grandson Francis Langhorne Dade (Francis L. Dade) was massacred in the Second Seminole War, and then became the namesake of Miami-Dade County, Florida, Dade County, Missouri, and Dade County, Georgia.

== Career ==
Royalist Henry Norwood mentioned a "John Smith" as aboard The Virginia Merchant with future Speaker Francis Moryson in 1649, and the same name also appears under the headrights listed by royalists Sir Henry Chicheley and Col. Richard Lee. In 1754 Smith/Dade patented 3,000 acres in then-vast Westmoreland County, Virginia, in what was later known as the Northern Neck Proprietary north of Warwick County. He had received headrights for transporting 60 people to the Virginia Colony, including Katherine Whitby, the wife of Speaker William Whitby. Dade moved his family to Westmoreland County by January 1660 and became a major in the Westmoreland County militia.

Francis Dade as "John Smith" served in the House only during the 1658 session, representing Warwick County alongside Thomas Davis, who had been its burgess in the 1656 session. Fellow burgesses chose him as Speaker for that session. Governor Samuel Mathews tried to dissolve the House on April 1. Under Smith's leadership, the House replied that the dissolution was illegal; it swore its members to secrecy and threatened to censure anyone who left the session. The following day, Mathews and his council offered to refer the dispute to Cromwell. The House refused and declared the governor's and councilors' offices vacant. It then proceeded to reelect Mathews and his council, forcing them all to swear an oath to honor the sovereignty of the House. During the next session, in 1659, Warwick county only elected one burgess, John Harlow.

== Death and legacy ==
Dade last purchased Virginia land in mid-1662, and died at sea in late 1662 or 1663. His widow married Major Andrew Gilson, a merchant.

== See also ==
- Hayden, Horace Edwin (1891). Virginia Genealogies. Pennsylvania: Wilkes-Barre. LCCN 66-26936.
- Stanard, William Glover (1911). Some emigrants to Virginia: memoranda in regard to several hundred emigrants. Richmond VA: Wm. Ellis Jones' Sons, Inc., Printers. LCCN 12000215.
- Howard, Joseph Jackson (1887). Some Pedigrees from the Visitation of Kent, 1663-68. London: London, Mitchell and Hughes. LCCN 21021730.
- Maurer, C. F. William (June 2005). Dragoon Diary. Authorhouse. ISBN 978-1-4208-3145-0.
