= Francis Poythress =

Politician of The Colony of Virginia

Member of the House of Burgesses for Northumberland County
- In office 1649 Serving with John Trussel
- Preceded by: William Presley
- Succeeded by: William Presley

Member of the House of Burgesses for Charles City County
- In office 1647-1648 Serving with Edward Hill
- Preceded by: Daniel Lluellin
- Succeeded by: Charles Sparrow
- In office 1644-1645 Serving with Edward Hill, John Bishop, John Westropp, Rice Hooe, Edward Prince
- Preceded by: Thomas Stegg
- Succeeded by: Francis Epps

Personal details
- Born: circa 1609 England
- Died: 1651 Charles City County, Colony of Virginia
- Resting place: unknown
- Spouse: Mary
- Children: Francis Poythress Jr. (d. 1688)

Francis Poythress (circa 1609–1651) was an English-born merchant, planter and politician who survived a lawsuit and served four terms in the House of Burgesses, all but the last representing Charles City County.

== Career ==
Poythress emigrated to the Virginia colony by 1633, when he patented lands on the James River in the part of Charles City County that later became Prince George County (records of both counties being destroyed in the American Civil War more than two centuries later). In 1633 the colony's General Court also appointed him administrator of the estates of Roger Kidd and Thomas Hall. Poythress may have traveled back and forth across the Atlantic Ocean (possibly as a sea captain), for he named himself (or conceivably his infant son of the same name) in two headrights in 1637. He was agent for London merchant Lawrence Evans, who brought suit against him. However arbitration by four Virginia merchants found Poythress not at fault.

Charles City County voters thrice elected Poythress to the House of Burgesses—first in the 1644 assembly, and then he was one of thee two men re-elected in 1645, along with Speaker Edward Hill, and then after a two term gap, again in the 1647-1648 session. In the 1649 session, Poythress (or conceivably his son of the same name) was an elected from developing Northumberland County north of the colonial capital. Poythress was also a tax collector in that county. In 1650 Poythress appeared in the Northumberland county court and assigned some headrights due him (generally for importing indentured servants, for he was identified as a captain) to other individuals.

== Personal life, death and legacy ==
Poythress had died by 1651. His widow, Mary, who had already born a son named Francis after his father, remarried, to Robert Wynne. Wynne died in 1675 and his will mentions Francis as his son-in-law, which in that era meant step-son. Francis Poythress Jr. never held legislative office but was a justice of the peace in Charles City County in 1677, as well as married and had children. The first name Francis was often held by later generations of the family, but only two men with that Poytress surname would serve in the Virginia General Assembly--John Poythress represented Prince George County (created from Charles City County south of the James River in 1702) for one session in the House of Burgesses, and Peter Poythress represented Prince George County in the last session of the House of Burgesses, and served many times in the Virginia House of Delegates after the Revolutionary War. His ancestor, the younger Francis Poythress (1630–1688) attained the rank of major in the militia by 1688.
