= John Howe Peyton =

Virginia lawyer and planter (1778–1847)

Member of the Virginia Senate for Augusta and Rockbridge Counties
- In office December 2, 1839 –
- Preceded by: David W. Patteron
- Succeeded by: Samuel McD Moore

Member of the Virginia House of Delegates from Prince William County
- In office December 5, 1808 – December 2, 1810 Serving with William Tyler, Gerard Alexander
- Preceded by: William A.G. Dade
- Succeeded by: William Fairfax

Personal details
- Born: April 27, 1778 Stony Hill plantation, Stafford County, Virginia
- Died: April 3, 1847 (aged 68) Montgomery Hall plantation, Augusta County, Virginia, US
- Relations: John Peyton (burgess) (grandfather)
- Education: Princeton College
- Occupation: lawyer, Planter, politician
- Profession: attorney

John Howe Peyton (1778–1847), was a Virginia lawyer and planter who served in both houses of the Virginia General Assembly, representing Prince William County (part-time) in the House of Delegates from 1808 through 1810, and Augusta and Rockbridge County senate seat in the Virginia from 1839 until his death. One source incorrectly states that his cousin John Henry Peyton, also born in Stafford County but whose birth and death dates as well as plantation location are unspecified, was the Prince William delegate.

== Early and family life ==
He was born in 1778, to the former Ann Hooe (1754-1833), who had been raised in neighboring Prince William County.

His father, John Rowzée Peyton (1754-1798) was serving in the Virginia Line of the Continental Army at the time, and was often away during this boy's early years. The boy's name honors his grandfather, Col. John Peyton (1691–1760), who had represented Stafford County in the House of Burgesses, and also owned land in what became Alexandria as well as in Prince William County. The family included an elder brother, Garnett Peyton (b.1775), as well as younger brothers Rowzee Peyton (b. 1784) and future general Bernard Peyton (b. 1792), as well as sisters Lucy Peyton (b. 1780 who married Thomas Green) and Ann Peyton (b. 1786 or 1790, who married Robert Green). The Virginia tax census of 1787 confirms that John Rowzee Peyton owned slaves in Stafford County, as did his youngest brother, Dr. Valentine Peyton (1756-1815), this man's uncle who served as a surgeon in the Virginia Line of the Continental Army during the Revolutionary War, then operated a boarding school at Tusculum, before serving as clerk of Stafford County during the War of 1812. John Henry Peyton his cousin was born to the former Mary Butler Washington (daughter of Bailey Washington and Catherine Storke) and that Dr. Valentine Peyton, and married Elizabeth Dent Ashton.

This boy received a private education locally. He traveled to New Jersey for higher education at Princeton College. After graduation, John H. Peyton read law with Bushrod Washington.

== Career ==
Peyton was admitted to the Virginia bar in 1799, a year after his father's death. At first he practiced law Fredericksburg and adjoining Counties, living in Dumfries, Virginia, the Prince William county seat (and a tobacco port). In 1807 Peyton, fellow lawyer William A.G. Dade and Benjamin Botts of Spotsylvania County were involved in settling the more than decade long litigation involving a plantation at the confluence of Quantico Creek and the Potomac River, which involved the estates of William Carr and the widow of William J. Tebbs. The following year, 1808, Prince William County voters elected John H. Peyton to succeed William A.G. Dade as one of their representatives in the Virginia House of Delegates (a part time position), and re-elected him once.

In June 1812, a month after Admiral Cockburn's incursion into Chesapeake Bay and raids along the Maryland and Virginia shore, Peyton became a member of Augusta County's committee of correspondence for a military association in Staunton, which initially wanted to establish a school to instruct potential recruits before what seemed a potential engagement with Great Britain. When the conflict began later that year, Peyton accepted a commission as major under former Revolutionary War officer now General Robert Porterfield, as chief of staff, and served until the conflict's end.

By 1810, John Peyton had moved to Augusta County, Virginia, where in 1811 he bought land about a mile west of town that he developed into his Montgomery Hall plantation residence. Peyton may have moved westward because a relative, Henry J. Peyton, had moved there in 1796, had become clerk of that Chancery Court in 1802, and was experiencing health issues that led to his death in 1814. Alternately, Peyton initially was appointed as assistant prosecutor by the Augusta circuit court in 1809, and in 1812 won election to formally succeed the county's long-term Commonwealth attorney, Chapman Johnson.

Peyton owned (and paid personal property tax on) slaves in Prince William County while he lived in Dumfries, although he did not own land there (only land in Stafford County he had inherited from his father). Upon moving to Staunton, he reported to the census-taker in 1810 he owned six slaves. Two decades19 slaves in 1830 (including four boys and four girls ten years old or younger), and 20 slaves in the final census of his lifetime, in 1840 (including 5 boys and 3 girls 10 years old or younger). Peyton served as Augusta County's Commonwealth's attorney (prosecutor) for decades before his service in the Virginia Senate. In 1820 Peyton declined to become the Whig candidate for Congress, and also declined the offer of a judgeship in 1824. Voters in Augusta and nearby Rockbridge Counties elected him to the Virginia Senate in 1839 (where he replaced multi-term veteran David W. Patteson) and re-elected him until his death, when Samuel McD Moore filled the remainder of his term. Some sources state Peyton resigned from the legislature in 1844 or 1845 citing injuries incurred falling from his horse.

Peyton was also active in the Episcopal Church, which had declined in Virginia after the new state disestablished it (stopped state support). Peyton was one of the signatories of a letter to Bishop James Madison urging his consecration of a local Methodist minister, who became rector of Trinity Episcopal Church in Staunton (1811-1818). Peyton also served for a decade as chairman of the board of the Western Virginia Lunatic Asylum, as well as on the Board of Visitors for the U.S. Military Academy in 1840.

== Personal life ==
In 1802 Peyton married Susanna Smith Madison (1780–1820), daughter of William Strother Madison and cousin of President James Madison. They had a son, William Madison Peyton (1805–1868), who became a distinguished citizen of Roanoke. Peyton then married Ann Montgomery Lewis (1803–1850), daughter of John Lewis of Sweet Springs plantation who had helped establish Monroe County. They had eight daughters and two sons. John Lewis Peyton (1824–1896) became a lawyer and author and married a North Carolina heiress, moved to Chicago in 1855 but as the Civil War began moved to Europe and became an agent for the Southern cause) and Yelverton Peyton (who never married and moved to Texas). Their daughters included Susan Madison Baldwin, Ann Montgomery (who never married), Mary Preston Peyton Grey (1827–1907; who would live in Harrisonburg), Lucy Garnett Hendren, Elizabeth Peyton Telfair (who moved to Ohio), Margaret Lynn Peyton Cochran, Virginia Peyton Kent (who moved to Wythe County) and Cornelia Peyton Brown Greene.

== Death and legacy ==
Peyton died at his Montgomery Hall home near Staunton on April 3, 1847, and was buried in Augusta County. An Alexandria newspaper published an obituary noting this "high merit and distinguished reputation" but incorrectly stated he was born in Prince William county. However, most of his papers were destroyed by the end of the century. A descendant wrote Adventures of my Grandfather about this man's father, John Rowzee Peyton.
