= Edward Chilton (attorney) =

British colonial lawyer and author)

Attorney General for the Virginia colony
- In office 1692–1698
- Preceded by: Edmund Jenings
- Succeeded by: William Randolph

Attorney General for the Barbados colony
- In office 1699–1707

Personal details
- Born: c. 1658 Cambridgeshire, England
- Died: 1707 (aged 48–49) Portsmouth, England
- Spouse: Hannah Hill
- Education: Trinity College, Dublin; University of Cambridge
- Occupation: lawyer, author

Edward Chilton (March 9, 1658 – July 7, 1707) emigrated to the colony of Virginia where he served as clerk of the Governor's Council and the Virginia General Assembly (1682-1686) as well as became a landowner, then became the colony's Attorney General(1691-1694). He may be best known as one of the three authors of "The Present State of Virginia" a 1697 report to the Board of Trade in London about the Virginia colony. Near the end of his life he also was the Attorney General of Barbados.

== Early life ==
Born in Cambridgeshire, England to Katherine and Edward Chilton, who may have been the local probate registrar, he received an education appropriate to his class, including on April 24, 1674, beginning studies at Trinity College in Dublin, Ireland. On January 12, 1676, Chilton was admitted to St. John's College at Cambridge University, on the condition that he work to receive financial aid, his father having died the previous year.

== Career ==
=== Virginia ===
By April 1682, Chilton was in the Virginia colony, serving as clerk both of the Governor's Council and of the Virginia General Assembly, which in November awarded him 20,000 pounds of tobacco for his services in organizing the colony's records. In the spring of 1684 Chilton received an additional 10,800 pounds of tobacco for subsequent work (about half the amount the governor had recommended). On October 24, 1686, Chilton provided the assembly with two books of land patents, the core of his clerical. He may have returned the England a couple of months later, for last document naming him as clerk was dated November 17, 1686.

Meanwhile, Chilton had invested in land in the colony, beginning with two acres in Jamestown (the colony's capital) in the spring of 1683. By the end of the year he also married Hannah Hill, daughter of planter and powerful politician Edward Hill, who granted the couple 2,717 acres of land. In the next two years, Chilton and partners secured patents for more than 1000 acres of mostly escheated land in New Kent County and a similar amount in Surry County.

Upon returning to England and being admitted to the Middle Temple, Chilton returned to Virginia by October 1691, when governor Francis Nicholson named him as the colony's attorney general. Chilton succeeded Edmund Jenings who had been promoted to the Governor's Council. However, the appointment needed approval from the new Board of Trade in London, which was not forthcoming. Jenings had become unpopular in the colony for his defense of the governor, and faced allegations of financial misconduct, but also had allies on the Board. Having received letters from both sides of the controversy, the Board of Trade conducted hearings in London and eventually appointed a committee to investigate the situation, and appointed Chilton, as well as Rev. James Blair (commissary of the Bishop of London but suspended from the Governor's Council by Nicholson) and attorney and burgess Henry Hartwell. The committee submitted its report (which also suggested reforms) on October 27, 1697. Although the report was soon consigned to archives without the reforms having been implemented, Robert Beverley consulted it and used it as a significant source in his History and Present State of Virginia, In Four Parts, published in 1705.

=== Barbados ===
Although Chilton was expected to return to Virginia in 1698 after receiving a post with the admiralty court for Virginia and North Carolina, he instead sailed to Barbados. In the next year, he wrote the Board asking to be appointed attorney general for that colony. In fact, before leaving Virginia, Chilton had given a power of attorney for his Virginia lands to his father in law (who died in 1700), and his wife had not born any children. Chilton took the oath of office as attorney general for Barbados on January 16, 1700. He soon became involved in that colony's tumultuous politics. The following July he was assaulted by two men. Although Chilton survived his injuries, one of his assailants died. In 1705, governor Sir Bevil Granville accused Chilton of high misdemeanors. Chilton was tried, found guilty and imprisoned. However, Chilton managed to flee to England to defend himself against the governor's accusations. While there, he helped merchants block a bill allowing paper money, but did not identify himself as the colony's attorney general.

== Death and legacy ==
While in Portsmouth, possibly waiting for a ship to return him to Barbadoes, Chilton fell ill and dictated his last will and testament, which he was unable to sign. He died by July 27, 1707, when the Queen issued a commission to another man to become the attorney general of Barbados, which document referred to Chilton as deceased.
