= Bernard Hooe Jr. =

American politician (1791–1869)

Member of the Virginia House of Delegates representing Prince William County
- In office December 6, 1819 – December 3, 1820 Serving with John Fox
- Preceded by: John Linton
- Succeeded by: John Bronaugh

Member of the Virginia House of Delegates representing Prince William County
- In office December 3, 1821 – December 1, 1822 Serving with Redmond Foster
- Preceded by: John Bronaugh
- Succeeded by: Walter Harrison

Personal details
- Born: January 20, 1791 Prince William County, Virginia
- Died: February 4, 1869 (aged 78) Washington, D.C.
- Resting place: Christ Church, Alexandria, Virginia
- Occupation: planter, merchant, politician

Bernard Hooe Jr. (January 20, 1791 – February 4, 1869) was a Virginia planter, merchant, lawyer, justice of the peace and legislator, who twice represented Prince William County in the Virginia House of Delegates, and served as mayor of Alexandria, Virginia.

== Early and family life ==
Bernard Hooe Jr. was the firstborn son of planter and lawyer Bernard Hooe (1739–1825), and born in Prince William County. More than a century earlier, his ancestors Rice Hooe had established plantations and a ferry across the Potomac River at the tip of the Northern Neck of Virginia in King George County. His grandfather Howson Hooe Sr. (1696–1780) had married Ann Frances Harris (1703–1751) and raised their large family on the family King George County plantations. His father's elder brothers Howson Hooe Jr. (1726–1796) and John Hooe (1728–1798) received a plantation in Prince William County in 1751 known as "Buckhall", which their mother had inherited, upon her death. Howson Hooe Jr. became a leading citizen of Prince William County, including a vestryman of Dettingen parish and justice of the county Court, but no longer lived in the county by 1787. He had married Mary E. Dade (1727–1796) and they had at least eight children, including sons Henry Dade Hooe (1747–1806), Robert Howson Hooe (1748–1832), Howson Hooe III (1750–1833), John Hooe (1752–1819), and Dade Hooe (1757–1837), as well as daughters Ann (1755-1834), Frances (1760-1818), Elizabeth (1765–1850) and Mary (1772–1832).

Like his elder brother Howson, Bernard Hooe Sr. also became a leading citizen of Prince William County, in part due to his service as a militia officer under Col. William Grayson during the American Revolutionary War. By 1787, he had become a lawyer like Grayson, and held more wealth in the county than his elder brothers, including 20 adult slaves and 29 slaves under 16 years of age, as well as 15 horses and 30 cattle, compared to 9 adult and 20 younger slaves owned in the county by his brother Howson, and 5 adult and 5 younger slaves owned by his brother Col. John Hooe, and 8 adult and 10 younger slaves owned by his nephew Robert Howson Hooe. Later, Bernard Hooe Esq. served as overseer of the Poor in Dettingen Parish (beginning in 1791), and as one of the justices of Prince William County (beginning in 1790). He became trustee of the new town of Haymarket near the then-large county's center in 1798, and won election as the county sheriff in 1800 (an office often held by succeeding generations of Hooes). In 1800, the elder Bernard Hooe purchased 145 acres near Bull Run and what decades after his death twice became a battlefield. About 1809, the same Bernard Hooe bought another 343 acres of land nearby and by 1815 had erected a house and lived on that plantation with his family, including this Bernard Jr. He died at that house in 1828, and his daughter Elizabeth Thacker Hooe inherited the house and plantation (which had increased to 957 acres and tax books came to list as "Hazel Plain"). Although the family retained the burial ground, Elizabeth's second husband, William H. Fowle, divided the property within a decade, and after succeeding sales Benjamin T. Chinn bought the estate, now known as the "Chinn House" and within Manassas National Battlefield Park.

Complicating matters, this man's uncle John also had a son named Bernard Hooe (1770–1809), who inherited part of that Buckhall tract upon his father's death in 1798, and lived on that estate he called "Locust Grove". Cousin Bernard Hooe actually won political office first, a special election in 1809 after former state senator Richard Brent (for neighboring Fairfax and Prince William counties) became U.S. Senator, but never assumed the office, having died in October 1809, of a gunshot wound from a Maryland duel with James Kempe (which caused the Virginia General Assembly to increase penalties for the previously outlawed practice).

== Career ==
Bernard Hooe became a lawyer as well as a merchant in northern Virginia, and also became a planter using enslaved labor in Prince William County using enslaved labor. Prince William County voters elected him to the Virginia House of Delegates in 1819. Though he did not win re-election, he was elected a second time in 1821, and again served a single term. He owned 20 slaves in Prince William County in 1820, and his father 32 slaves.

In 1817, Bernard Hooe advertised Prince William county land for sale in the Alexandria Gazette, and three years later used the same newspaper to offer his legal services in the courts of Prince William, Fairfax and Fauquier counties. In 1804, his sister Elizabeth had married Alexandria merchant and lawyer James H. Hooe (a distant cousin), who retired from Robert T. Hooe & Co. in 1809, three years after winning a seat on Alexandria's city council. Perhaps in 1807, and definitely in 1818 James H. Hooe became president of Alexandria's common council. He continued as a city councilor until 1821 and was active in the movement to have Alexandria retroceded from the District of Columbia (although Elizabeth would die a widow in Prince William County in 1831).

By 1830, this Bernard Hooe had moved much of his legal practice and family (including 11 slaves) to Alexandria, Virginia. Hooe may also have owned four additional slaves in Fairfax County in 1830. Hooe became a member of Alexandria's city council in 1833, and fellow councilors selected him for what had become a three-year term as mayor (1833–1836). In March 1840, Bernard Hooe and fellow attorney Henry M. Thomas defended four "negroes" charged in Fairfax County with rebellion and insurrection for beating John Ashford; two of the accused prisoners were convicted and sentenced to hang; the other two were acquitted.

By 1850, Bernard Hooe (who now identified himself as a clerk), his wife and sons Philip (a merchant) and Bernard Jr. had moved to the District of Columbia and owned no slaves, although a distant relative Abram B. Hooe in King George County owned 51 slaves in that census and 65 slaves a decade later. By 1860, Philip Hooe had left his father's household and returned to Alexandria, where he would soon enlist and fight for the Confederacy; his parents now lived with Mrs. Caroline McCallister and her family as the elder Bernard Hooe continued to work as a clerk and his younger son as a draftsman. By this time, his cousin John Hooe had become one of Prince William County's largest landowners, using enslaved labor at his plantations including Mayfield, which would become a key fortification protecting the Manassas Junction Railroad in the Civil War. A more distant relative, Dr. Abram Hooe of King George County, would receive a Presidential pardon for his Confederate service in 1866.

== Personal life ==
In 1811 this Bernard Hooe married Eleanor Buchanan Briscoe (1793–1862) in St. Mary's County, Maryland, and they would have at least eight children. Although their son John Bernard Hooe did not survive infancy, and Bernard Hooe Jr. (1831–1870) barely survived his father, CSA Capt. Philip Beverley Hooe (1833–1895) enlisted in the 17th Virginia Infantry as the American Civil War began, and although not re-elected as his company's lieutenant in early 1862, by the end of the year he survived his battle wound defending Richmond and became captain of Company A. After the conflict, P.B. Hooe became an Alexandria businessmen as well as leading member of Confederate veterans organizations. Two of Bernard Hooe's daughters survived their parents: Mary Elizabeth Hooe (1815–1887) married D.C. physician Dr. Johnston; and Sarah Ellen Hooe (1823-1882), married Alexandria commission merchant George Dashiel Fowle in 1843, and their daughter (this Bernard's granddaughter) Ellen would marry General (and later Virginia governor) Fitzhugh Lee.

== Death and legacy ==
Bernard Hooe survived his wife (who died in 1862) and died in Washington, D.C., on February 4, 1869. His remains were returned to Alexandria for burial beside his wife and several of their children in the graveyard of Christ Church.
