= Dade Monument (West Point) =

Monument in honor of Francis L. Dade

Coordinates: 41°23′50.43″N 73°58′1.39″W

- United States
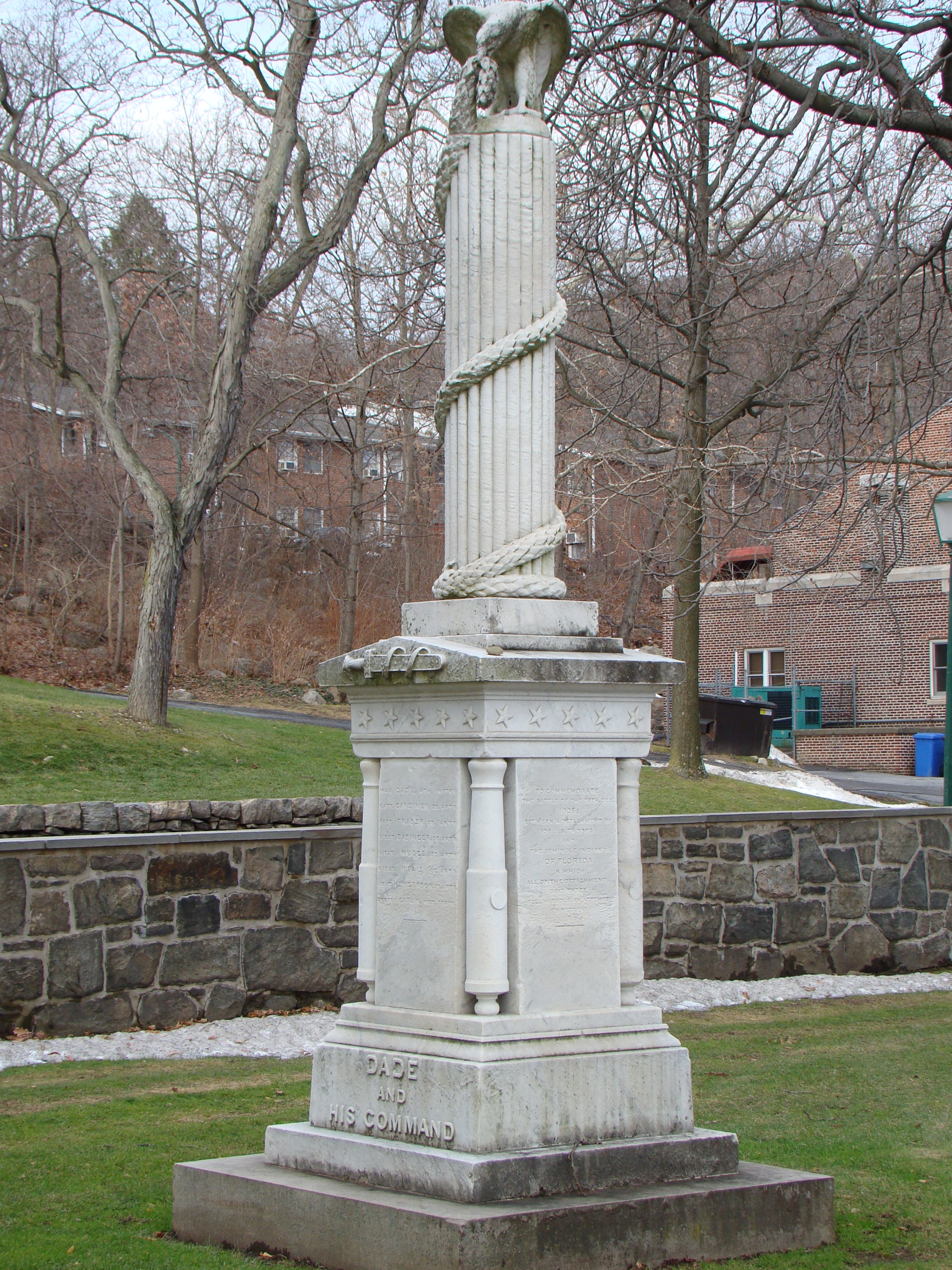
- Dade monument near the entrance to the West Point Cemetery
- For Francis L. Dade Dade Massacre
- Unveiled: 1845
- Location: near Highland Falls, New York

Burials by war
- Second Seminole War
- "Dade and his command"

Dade Monument is a monument and United States Military Academy Cemetery, in honor of Major Francis L. Dade and his command of 110 men who were defeated by Seminole warriors at Dade Massacre on 28 December 1835. The monument has moved several times in its history. First erected in 1845, it originally stood overlooking the Hudson River on the east edge of the Plain. It was moved further inland prior to 1898 to make way for the construction of Cullum Hall. In 1917 it was moved further south in front of the Old Cadet Library. In 1948, it was relocated to its current location near the entrance to the West Point Cemetery to make way for the Patton Monument.

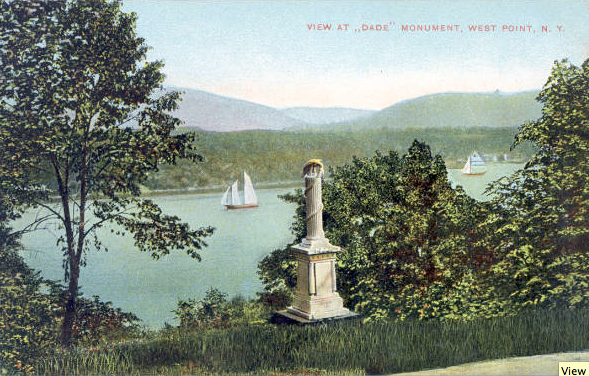
Pre 1898 post card showing the monument's original location on the edge of The Plain
