= Henry Soane =

Virginia politician, real estate investor and landowner

13th Speaker of the Virginia House of Burgesses
- In office 1661–1661
- Preceded by: Theodorick Bland of Westover
- Succeeded by: Robert Wynne

Member of the House of Burgesses for James City County, Colony of Virginia 1
- In office 1660-1662 Serving with Walter Chiles Jr., Robert Ellison, Richard Ford, William Morley
- Preceded by: Thomas Foulke
- Succeeded by: Edward Ramsay
- In office 1658 Serving with William Corker, Thomas Loveinger, Richard Webster
- Preceded by: Robert Ellyson
- Succeeded by: Walter Chiles Jr.
- In office 1652-1655 Serving with John Fludd, Daniel Mansill, George Stevens, Robert Wetherall, William Whittakers, Abraham Watson, Walter Chiles, Thomas Dipnall,
- Preceded by: Walter Chiles
- Succeeded by: Robert Ellyson

Personal details
- Born: 1622
- Died: 1661 (aged 38–39) Virginia
- Spouse: Judith Fuller
- Children: Henry Jr., Judith Soane Randolph, John, Elizabeth, William
- Occupation: Farmer

Henry Soane (1622–1661) was an English politician, real estate investor, and landowner in the colony of Virginia, who served in the House of Burgesses. He was a member of the House from 1652 to 1655, in 1658, and from 1660 to 1661, and he was the House Speaker in 1661.

== Early and family life ==
He married Judith Fuller, which whom they had five children. His son William Soane and grandson Henry Soane II would also serve in the House of Burgesses representing Henrico County and James City County, respectively. His daughter Judith Soane first married Henry Randolph I (the clerk of the House of Burgesses) and after his death in 1673, Major Peter Field of Henrico County. His son John Soane became a noted surveyor, as well as agent of the Royal African Company, but never married and gave his plantation in Henrico County, Poplar Spring, to his brother William and his surveying instruments to Williams' son Henry Soane II. The progenitor of a political dynasty that spanned two centuries, Soane is the great-great grandfather of U.S. president Thomas Jefferson.

== Career ==
Soane began speculating in Virginia real estate by 1651, patenting land on the upper side of the Chickahominy River, as well as the northeast side of the Mattaponi River and the south side of the Rappahannock River. His main plantation was in James City County, and in 1656, he purchased 2200 acres. His and his eldest son Henry Jr.'s land in New Kent County totalled 2800 acres by 1656. Some of the land was along Diascund Creek, which became the dividing line between James City County and New Kent County in 1651. The Mattaponi land was then in New Kent County. He assigned his 45- acres on the Rappahannock River patented in 1652 to Governor Sir Henry Chicheley in 1654

James City County voters repeatedly elected Soane as one of the men representing them in the House of Burgesses, and burgesses elected him as their Speaker. During his speakership, he asked Colonel Francis Moryson and Randolph to prepare a collection of acts passed by the legislature, for which he received tobacco worth 50 pounds sterling, and which was published in London in 1662.

== See also ==
- Ancestry of Thomas Jefferson
