= Thomas Stegg Jr. =

British merchant and politician

Thomas Stegg

Member of the Virginia Governor's Council
- In office 1662–1667

Personal details
- Born: Britain
- Died: 1670
- Spouse: Sarah
- Occupation: Merchant, politician

Military service
- Branch/service: cavalry
- Rank: Captain
- Commands: Henrico and Charles City counties

Thomas Stegg Jr. (died 1670), like his father of the same name, was a British merchant and politician in the Colony of Virginia.

== Career ==
Stegg helped his father import indentured servants into the Virginia colony, and after his father's death at sea in late 1651 or early 1652, inherited property in Charles City County. He patented land in Henrico County with Manwaring Hammond, who was a justice of the peace in Charles City County, and made it his home and trading post.

In 1661, Gov. Francis Morrison appointed Stegg Captain of all the horse (cavalry) militia raised in Henrico and Charles City Counties, under Col. Abraham Wood, Lt. Col. Thomas Drewe and Major William Harris, with Drewe and Harris also gathering and commanding infantry companies based on geographic areas draining into the James River, and other such geographic infantry companies led by Captains John Epes, William Farrar (Jr.), Peter Jones, Edward Hill Jr. and Francis Gray.

In 1662 Stegg was appointed to the Virginia Governor's Council, and served until shortly before his death in 1670. On November 24, 1664, his formal royal commission as the colony's auditor general was read at the colony's General Court session.

== Death and legacy ==
After Stegg died in 1670, his widow Sarah married burgess Thomas Grendon, Jr. of Charles City County, and bore a son. During Bacon's Rebellion, Sarah vociferously endorsed Nathaniel Bacon and the rebels, incurring the wrath of Governor William Berkeley.
