= Francis L. Dade =

United States Army officer (1792–1835)

Francis Dade
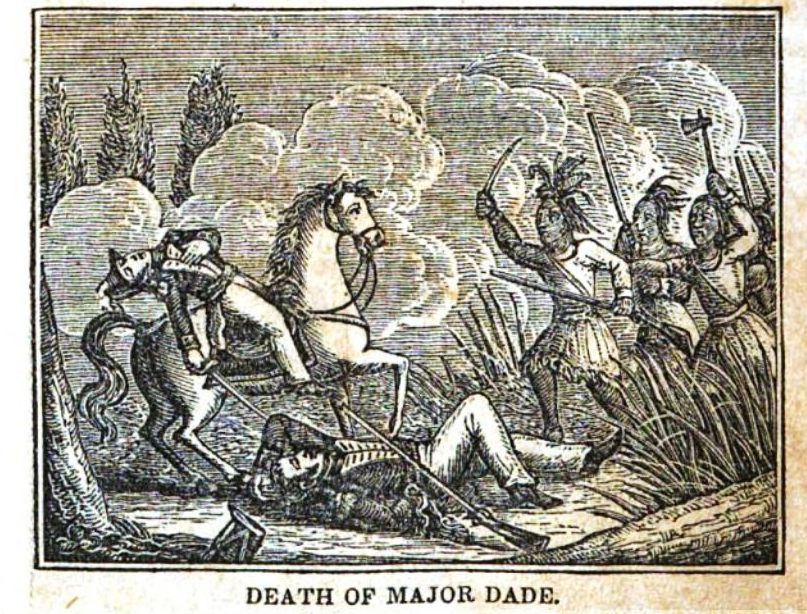
- Engraving of the death of Dade (on horseback)
- Born: February 22, 1792; King George County, Virginia
- Died: December 28, 1835 (aged 43); Sumter County, Florida
- Burial place: St. Augustine National Cemetery
- Spouse: Amanda Middleton
- Military career
- Allegiance: United States
- Branch: United States Army
- Service years: 1813–1835
- Rank: Major
- Unit: 4th Infantry Regiment
- Commands: Key West Army Base
- Conflicts: War of 1812; First Seminole War; Second Seminole War; Dade battle †

Major Francis Langhorne Dade (February 22, 1792 – December 28, 1835) was a United States Army officer who served in the War of 1812 and the Seminole Wars. Dade was killed in an ambush by Seminole warriors that came to be known as the Dade battle, the first engagement of the Second Seminole War, and one of the worst U.S. military defeats at the hands of Native Americans. After his death, Dade became the namesake of several places, most notably Miami-Dade County, Florida.

== Life and career ==
Francis Langhorne Dade was born in King George County, Virginia in 1792. Dade's family was part of the elite Planter class of the South. His ancestor, also named Francis Dade, migrated from England to the colony of Virginia in 1650, and was elected as speaker of the House of Burgesses. Dade initially studied to be a lawyer under the tutelage of his cousin Lawrence Taliaferro Dade, but he later chose to pursue a military career instead. In March 1813 (during the War of 1812) he joined the U.S. Army 12th Infantry Regiment as a Lieutenant. During the war he was stationed in Louisa County. After the war ended he was transferred to the 4th Infantry Regiment in May 1815.

In 1818, Dade was part of Andrew Jackson's army that invaded Florida. During this invasion, Dade participated in the occupation of Spanish Pensacola and the raising of the U.S. flag over the city. He was also promoted to Captain in 1818. Dade was later appointed as the duty officer under Andrew Jackson in Pensacola. In 1821, after Florida was annexed, Dade was involved in the arrest of Spanish official José Callava, who had refused to hand over documents to the United States. Dade apprehended Callava and personally brought him to Andrew Jackson. Dade later led two expeditions, in 1825 and 1826, from Fort Brooke to Fort King, which paved the way for a military road between the two forts. In November 1826, Dade and his soldiers built Fort Duval, a military fort on the mouth of the Suwannee River. In January 1827, Dade and his soldiers displaced a number of Seminole Indians from their villages, using the pretext of the murder of a White settler family by the Aucilla River. In December 1827, Dade married Amanda Middleton in Pensacola, which was one of the first Protestant marriages in the city.

Dade was later put in command of the United States Army base on Key West. He was promoted to Brevet Major in February 1828 after ten years of service as a Captain. At Key West he led a garrison of 47 soldiers, half of whom were European immigrants. Dade was stationed in Key West until late 1835, when tensions rose with the Seminoles over the Indian Removal Act, which would soon culminate in the Second Seminole War. Because of these tensions, General Duncan Clinch ordered Dade to leave 1 NCO and 3 Privates in Key West before taking the rest of his men to Fort Brooke to prepare for the impending conflict with the Seminole Indians.

Major Dade's final mission was to lead a U.S. Army column of 108 soldiers (100 Enlisted men and 8 Officer, including himself) and 1 six-pounder cannon from Fort Brooke up north to Fort King. The soldiers under Dade's command were part of the 4th Infantry Regiment, 2nd Artillery Regiment, and 3rd Artillery Regiment. As the Army column marched north, the Seminoles destroyed bridges over the Hillsborough River and Withlacoochee River in order to delay the progress of the column. On December 28, 1835, Seminoles warriors led by two chiefs, Micanopy and Chipco, ambushed the U.S. Army column, killing Dade and nearly all of his soldiers, leaving only two survivors. This ambush would become known as the Dade battle. On that same day, a group of Seminoles warriors assassinated U.S. official Wiley Thompson at Fort King. Both of these attacks marked the beginning of the Second Seminole War. These events were followed in 1836 by widespread Seminole attacks on white settlers in Florida, and then by a U.S. military offensive led by General Winfield Scott. Dade and his men were not formally buried until a unit led by Edmund P. Gaines arrived at the site of the battle in February 1836. Dade's remains were only identifiable by his vest and infantry buttons.

== Legacy ==
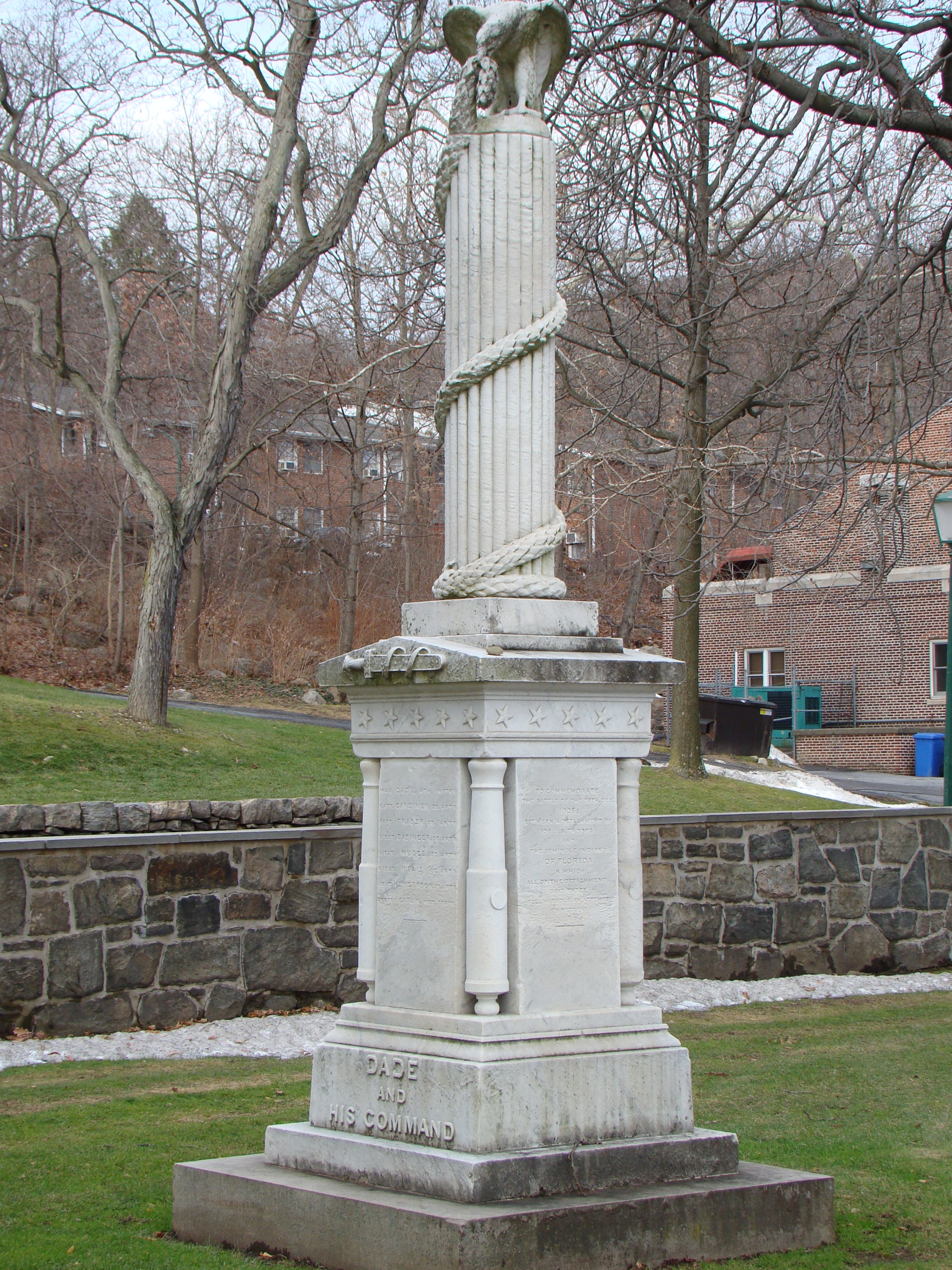
The Dade Monument, located at the West Point Cemetery.

When hostilities ceased, the Army proposed to transfer the remains of all who died in the territory, including those who fell with Dade, to a single burial ground. Reinternment took place at the St. Augustine Post Cemetery, which would become St. Augustine National Cemetery. In addition to Dade's command, more than 1,400 soldiers were interred in three mass graves. These men are memorialized by the Dade Monument, which is composed of three distinct pyramids, constructed of native coquina stone, and an obelisk. The dedication of the memorial at a ceremony on August 14, 1842, marked the end of the Second Seminole War.

The Dade Monument was built in 1845 at the West Point Cemetery to honor Major Dade and the men under his command who were killed in battle.

Miami-Dade County, Florida (until 13 November 1997 named Dade County); Dade County, Georgia; Dade County, Missouri; Dadeville, Alabama; and Dade City, Florida are all named after Major Dade. A U.S. military fort on Egmont Key called Fort Dade was also named after him. The battle is re-enacted at the Dade Battlefield Historic State Park each year. In 2002, the Dade County Courthouse was renamed the Major Francis Langhorne Dade County Courthouse by the Board of County Commissioners of Miami-Dade County. In the resolution changing the courthouse's name, the Board noted that it found "that Major Francis Langhorne Dade is a person who made a significant contribution to Miami-Dade County".
