= Lawrence Taliaferro Dade =

American politician (1785–1842)

General Lawrence Taliaferro Dade

Member of the Senate of Virginia
- In office 1819–1832

Member of the Virginia House of Delegates representing Orange County
- In office 1811 – May 16, 1813 Serving with Philip Barbour
- Preceded by: James Barbour
- Succeeded by: Robert Mallory

Personal details
- Born: 1785 Sylvan Ledge, Orange County, Virginia, U.S.
- Died: March 25, 1842 (aged 56–57) Owensboro, Kentucky, U.S.
- Spouse: Anne Mayo (m. 1815)
- Children: 7

Military service
- Rank: Captain
- Unit: 2nd Regiment of the Virginia Artillery, 1812

Lawrence Taliaferro Dade "of Bell Forest" (1785 – March 25, 1842) was a Virginia state senator, planter and captain in the US Army.

At the time he was serving as a member of the Virginia Assembly (1808–1819). He also served as a member of the Virginia State Senate from 1819 to 1832.

Before his death in 1842, he moved with his family to Owensboro, Kentucky.

== Early and family life ==
Lawrence Taliaferro Dade was born to Captain Francis Dade and Sarah Taliaferro in 1785. Captain Francis Dade and his cousin Baldwin Dade were patriots of the Revolutionary War serving in the 3rd Continental Light Dragoons. Lawrence Taliaferro Dade's great-great-grandfather was Francis Dade, also known as John Smith.

He married Anne Mayo on May 4, 1815, in Henrico, Virginia. They had children: Mary Jackson Dade, Lawrence Alexander Dade, Lucy Fitzhugh, Alexander Dade, Francis Cadwallader Dade, Virginia Elizabeth Dade and Agnes Macon Dade.

== Military ==
Dade entered the War of 1812 as Captain of the 2nd Regiment of the Virginia Artillery.

== Career ==
After admission to the Virginia bar, Dade had a law office in Orange County, Virginia. When his cousin Francis L. Dade finished school, he read law under Lawrence's supervision.

== Virginia Senate ==
Virginia voters first elected Dade to the Virginia Senate in 1811, and he was re-elected numerous times. Much of his correspondence with President James Madison has survived.

During a senate session in 1828, Dade praised Joseph Cabell of Nelson County Virginia who was nearly regarded as a co-founder of the University of Virginia, stating "If aught of good proceeds from the University, the pride and glory of Virginia, the member from Nelson cannot be forgotten; for he, in promoting that monument of wisdom and taste, was second only to the immortal Jefferson."
