= Edward Nott =

British Colonial governor (1657–1706)

Coat of Arms of Edward Nott

Colonel Edward Nott (1657 – August 23, 1706) was an English Colonial Governor of Virginia. He was appointed by Queen Anne on either April 25, 1705 or August 15, 1705. His administration lasted only one year, as he died in 1706 at the age of 49. He is interred at Bruton Parish Church in Williamsburg, Virginia. He is noted as having been a "mild, benevolent man."

== See also ==
- Colony of Virginia
- Governor's Palace
- List of colonial governors of Virginia
- History of Virginia
