= Rice Hooe =

Rhys Hooe

Member of the Virginia House of Burgesses representing Shirley Hundred Island
- In office 1633–1633
- Preceded by: Cheney Boys
- Succeeded by: n/a

Member of the Virginia House of Burgesses representing Charles City County
- In office 1645–1646
- Preceded by: John Bishop
- Succeeded by: Francis Poythress

Personal details
- Born: circa 1599 Wales
- Died: after 1655 Charles City County
- Occupation: planter, soldier, legislator, justice of the peace

Rice Hooe was the name of three Virginia colonists, two of whom served in the colonial House of Burgesses, and became ancestors of a family of planters important in northern Virginia and southern Maryland. Their descendants Alexander Hooe, Bernard Hooe Jr., James Hooe, two named John Hooe as well as John Hooe Jr., and William Hooe would all serve in the Virginia General Assembly before the American Civil War.

== The emigrant ==
Rhys Hooe (c. 1599 – after 1655) was born in about 1599 in Wales. He sailed to the Virginia Colony, possibly to Jamestown as early as 1618, and appeared as a resident of Charles City County in 1624–1625, after King James dissolved the London Company and made Virginia a royal colony.

Voters from Shirley Hundred Island elected Hooe to represent them in the Virginia General Assembly in 1632–1633 (when it was a single house body). Hooe sailed back to England, then finally emigrated to Virginia in 1635. In 1636 Hooe received a 1200-acre land grant in Charles City County for emigrating with his wife to the Virginia colony, and an additional 1100 acres in headrights for paying the transportation costs of 23 additional people. In 1639 he served as county commissioner. In 1638 Hooe received another land grant, this time of 700 acres in James City County along the James River because he had paid to transport 14 people to the Virginia colony. In 1639, Hooe received his final major land grant, 300 acres for transporting 6 people to James City County. He only had one child who survived him, as discussed below, and that son also only had one child.

In June 1641, Hooe joined with Walter Austin, Joseph Johnson, and Walter Chiles in a petition to explore land to the south-west of the Appomattake River (present-day Appomattox River). Accounts differ whether Hooe again won election as a Burgess for Shirley Hundred Island in 1642 and for Charles City County in 1644, but he was definitely one of the Charles City County burgesses in the legislative Assemblies of 1645 (alongside Edward Hill, Francis Poythres and Edward Prince), and 1645–1646 (alongside William Parker, Francis Epes, Edward Hill, Edward Prince, Charles Sparrow and Anthony Wyatt). In 1655 Hooe became one of the gentlemen justices of the Charles City County court. He also served as a Vestryman of Westover Parish.

Rice Hooe III

Member of the Virginia House of Burgesses representing Stafford County
- In office 1699–1699 Serving with George Mason I
- Preceded by: Thomas Ousley
- Succeeded by: William Fitzhugh

Member of the Virginia House of Burgesses representing Charles City County
- In office 1703–1705 Serving with Richard Fossaker
- Preceded by: William Fitzhugh
- Succeeded by: William Fitzhugh

Personal details
- Born: circa 1660 Charles City County
- Died: after 1715 King George County
- Occupation: planter, soldier, legislator, justice of the peace

== Northern Neck planter ==
Either Rhys Hooe, or his son or grandson of the same anglicized name, moved north in the Tidewater region to what is now called the Northern Neck, where they operated plantations using enslaved labor. By the early 18th century, the Hooe family operated an important sailboat ferry across the Potomac River linking Pope's Creek on the Virginia shore with Mathias Point near Port Tobacco, Maryland, for which multi-term burgess William Fitzhugh had secured a legislative charter in 1699. By 1713 the ferry was described as linking Col. Rice Hooe's to Cedar Point, Maryland.

Either Rice Hooe II (1640–1694) or (more likely) Rice Hooe III (b. in Charles City County circa 1660, d. after 1715) served in the House of Burgesses representing then vast Stafford County, together with George Mason I in 1699 (Rev. John Waugh having been ruled ineligible to serve as a burgess because of his clerical status). While not immediately re-elected, Hooe again won election to the House of Delegates and served alongside Richard Fossaker in the Assembly of 1703–1705.

The second Rice Hooe married twice, first to Susannah Nicholas, then to the widow of Thomas Howard. The third Rice Hooe married three times: first to the widow Mary Dade Massey in 1691, then in 1695 to Anne Howson (the daughter of Welsh sea captain Robert Howson, who had patented 6000 acres in 1669 which later became Alexandria, Virginia for bringing 120 people to the Virginia colony, and sold the land to Stafford County merchant and surveyor John Alexander, who would become the city's namesake), and finally to the widow Frances Townsend Withers. Rice Hooe III gained land by these marriages, as well as secured a 200-acre land grant in Stafford County in 1704.

He erected what would become the family home, Barnesfield, at the ferry's Virginia terminus, beginning in 1715. Five years later, the Virginia General Assembly split Stafford County, and the area around Barnesfield became King George County, Virginia. Hooe III had several sons. His son by Anne Howson, Howson Hooe Sr. (1696-1790) would marry Anne Frances Harris, who inherited "Buckhall" plantation in Prince William County, and who bore several sons, including Howson Hooe Jr, William Hooe, John Hooe, Bernard Hooe, John Hooe and Harris Hooe, some of whom also served in the legislature). By another marriage Hooe III had sons Capt. John Hooe (who at different times served as delegate and justice of the Peace in Stafford and Prince William County) and Rhys Hooe IV. Capt. John Hooe patented 2900 acres in what became Prince William County, Virginia after settlement increased and the legislature again split Stafford County, near what would later become Manassas National Battlefield Park.

Richard Hooe, grandson of Rice Hooe III, was probably the last family member to operate that 3-mile long Potomac ferry. Barnesfield, at which the Dr. Abraham Barnes Hooe resided in 1861 and "spinster Hooe" occupied during the American Civil War, reportedly was burned by federal troops.
