= Thomas Dew (politician) =

Virginia landowner and politician

7th Speaker of the Virginia House of Burgesses
- In office 1652–1652
- Preceded by: Edward Major
- Succeeded by: Walter Chiles

Member of the Virginia Governor's Council
- In office 1654-1660

Member of the House of Burgesses representing Nansemond County, Virginia
- In office 1652-1655 Serving with Edward Major, Peter Montague, Thomas Godwin, Samuel Stoughton
- Preceded by: John Carter
- Succeeded by: Edward Stretter
- In office 1642 Serving with John Carter, Daniel Coogan, William Parker
- Preceded by: John Gookin
- Succeeded by: Randall Crew

Personal details
- Died: c. 1691
- Occupation: Farmer

Thomas Dew (died c. 1691) was a Virginia landowner and politician representing Nansemond County.

== Early life ==
His birth date and location are uncertain, though he had to have reached legal age (21) before he settled in Nansemond County in 1634 as discussed below. In 1672 Dew became a Quaker, possibly after William Edmundson, an associate of Quaker George Fox visited Nansemond County. Complicating matters, in 1660, a man named "Andrew Dew" bought land in Essex County considerably northwest of Nansemond County. That man had a wife named Ann and sons named Andrew and Thomas, but no proof exists of a family relation between the two Dew families.

== Career ==
Dew settled in the vicinity of the Nansemond River by 1634, and in 1642 represented what was then-called "Upper Norfolk County" (but a decade later became Nansemond County) in the General Assembly. Nansemond County voters then re-elected Dew to what became called the House of Burgesses in every session until 1656, and in the second (November) session of 1652 he succeeded his neighbor Edward Major as Speaker; with burgesses electing Walter Chiles of Charles City County their speaker in the next session. Dew served on the Governor's Council of State from 1655 until 1660.

In 1656 Virginia's governor authorized Dew to explore the coast of North Carolina between Cape Hatteras and Cape Fear.

== Death and legacy ==
The date of Dew's death is unknown, but was after 1681.

Notwithstanding later Quaker opposition to slavery, his descendants or that of family members likely owned slaves.
