= Edward Hill Jr. =

Virginia planter, local official and politician

Member of the Virginia Governor's Council
- In office 1691-1700

Speaker of the Virginia House of Burgesses
- In office 1684–1684
- Preceded by: Thomas Ballard
- Succeeded by: William Kendall

Member of the House of Burgesses for Charles City County
- In office 1688–1688 Serving with Peter Perry
- Preceded by: John Stith
- Succeeded by: Robert Bolling
- Incumbent
- Assumed office 1684 Serving with James Minge
- Preceded by: James Biss
- Succeeded by: John Stith

Member of the House of Burgesses for James City County
- In office 1679–1679
- Preceded by: Richard Lawrence
- Succeeded by: Thomas Ballard

Member of the House of Burgesses for Charles City County
- In office 1676–1676 Serving with Nicholas Wyatt
- Preceded by: Robert Wynne
- Succeeded by: James Biss

Personal details
- Born: 1637 Shirley Plantation, Charles City Shire, Colony of Virginia, English America
- Died: November 30, 1700 (aged 62–63) Shirley Plantation, Charles City County, Colony of Virginia, English America
- Children: Edward Hill III
- Parent: Edward Hill
- Occupation: planter, officer, politician

Edward Hill Jr. (circa 1637–November 30, 1700) was a controversial Virginia planter, local official and politician, who like his father operated Shirley Plantation in part using enslaved labor, as well as briefly served as 20th Speaker of the Virginia House of Burgesses (in 1684), and several times represented Charles City County in that body.

== Early and family life ==
Coat of Arms of Edward Hill

Edward Hill Jr. was part of a four-generation line of Edward Hills, spanning from his grandfather to his son. Like his father, Col. Edward Hill, he served on the Council of State (the Virginia Governor's Council), the upper house of the Virginia General Assembly. The senior Hill had a distinguished career prior to his council appointment—establishing Shirley Plantation, serving multiple terms as Speaker of the House of Burgesses, and leading Virginia forces against Native Americans and Maryland usurpers.

This Edward Hill married twice, both times within the First Families of Virginia, daughters of burgesses. In 1680, Hill married Anne Goodrich (1625–1696). Following her death, but in the same year, he married Tabitha Scarborough (1640–1717). One of his wives was the mother of Edward Hill III (died 1726) who continued to operate Shirley Plantation as well as also served in the House of Burgesses.

== Career ==
Like his father (and as his son would later), Hill operated Shirley Plantation in Charles City County, using indentured and (increasingly) enslaved labor. Hill participated in the African slave trade, including receiving headrights for land based on those imported slaves.

At various times, Hill commanded the militia of Charles City County and Surry County across the James River. Charles City County voters elected Hill (like his father) multiple times as one of their representatives in the House of Burgesses, and after the reorganization of 1680, fellow delegates once elected him as their Speaker (so he served a single term in 1684).

On the first day of Bacon's Rebellion in 1676, some rebels attempted to get Hill to join them, but he was a friend of Governor Berkeley, and took an active part in suppressing the rebellion, although Bacon's friends expelled him from the House of Burgesses in 1676. Bacon's rebels also imprisoned Hill's pregnant wife and children during the rebellion, although they survived, and the baby eventually born became this man's heir (Edward Hill III).

Hill became a subject of the "Charles City Grievances" of May 10, 1677, which accused him of misappropriating county taxes for his own use." He was also accused of misappropriation of public funds before the 3-member royal commission investigating the rebellion, which included his son-in-law Edward Chilton and which ultimately recommended that Hill be left out of the new Governor's Council. Nonetheless, on September 29, 1679, during the royal investigation, Deputy Gov. Henry Chicheley (one of Gov. Berkeley's supporters) appointed Hill as the colony's attorney general, although the following year Edmund Jenings arrived from Britain and was sworn in as the colony's attorney general. The commissioners called Hill "the most hated man of all the county where he lived."

A decade later, around 1690, the Lords of Trade again reorganized the British colonial structure, which led to a power struggle between the Burgesses and the new Governor Francis Nicholson. The Burgesses elected Hill as the colony's treasurer in 1691, but the governor refused to acknowledge the Assembly's power to appoint that position, considering it his prerogative. Hill compromised by accepting the lucrative position of collector of revenue for the upper district of the James River. In 1697, Governor Edmund Andros named Hill as Judge of Admiralty for Virginia and North Carolina.
