= Thomas Stegg =

British merchant and politician

1st Speaker of the Virginia House of Burgesses
- In office 1643–1643
- Preceded by: position created
- Succeeded by: Edward Hill, Sr.

Member of the Virginia House of Burgesses for Charles City County, Colony of Virginia
- In office 1643 Serving with Walter Aston, Walter Chiles
- Preceded by: Edward Hill, Sr.
- Succeeded by: Edward Hill, Sr.

Member of the Virginia Governor's Council
- In office 1642-1642, 1647-1650

Personal details
- Born: Britain
- Died: 1652 Atlantic Ocean, aboard the ship John
- Children: Thomas Stegg Jr., Grace Stegge Byrd
- Occupation: Merchant

Thomas Stegg (or Stegge) (died 1652) was a British merchant and politician in the Colony of Virginia. He served in both houses of the Virginia General Assembly, and became the first elected Speaker of the Virginia House of Burgesses during the 1643 session, when the Burgesses first met as a separate lower house.

== Career ==
Stegg divided his time between Virginia and London. He imported indentured servants into the Virginia colony and sold the contracts paying for their passage to planters seeking labor, and his son Thomas Stegg Jr. served as security. Stegg was a factor for London merchant Maurice Thompson, who was a principal architect of Parliament's commercial policy during the period, and also had business ties with London stationer Michael Sparke. also an ardent Puritan. Stegg invested with William Claiborne and others in the trading post on Kent Island, Maryland and owned more than 600 acres on Old Man's Creek which later became part of the Westover Plantation in Charles City County at the time of his death.

Stegg supported Virginia's Governor John Harvey, and helped Richard Kemp (the Colony's secretary) escape from Virginia in 1640, three years before he became a burgess. Although Stegg was on the Virginia Governor's Council in 1642 (the upper body of the Virginia General Assembly), he resigned, and became one of the three men representing Charles City County in the 1643 session, the first in which the upper and lower houses sat separately. He again served as a member of the Virginia Governor's Council in 1647 through his death in late 1651 or early 1652.

Stegg supported Parliament against the king during the English Civil War. In the summer of 1644, in Boston harbor, he brought his 24 gun ship abreast of the 100-ton ship 'Mary', which had sailed from the royalist port of Bristol and had been loaded with fish to be sold in Bilbao on the return trip. He showed the captain his commission from Lord High Admiral Robert Rich for the capture of royalist vessels, and successfully demanded its surrender.

== Personal life ==
Stegg's widow, primary heir and executrix was named Elizabeth. His son Thomas Stegg Jr. was named reversionary heir (and later also served on the Virginia Governor's Council, and Stegg also made bequests to his daughter Grace Stegg Byrd and her children. Her son (this man's grandson) William Byrd I would become a powerful planter and politician.

== Death and legacy ==
In September 1651, Parliament appointed Stegg, William Claiborne, Richard Bennett, Robert Dennis and Edmond Curtis as Parliament's commissioners to secure Virginia's and Maryland's surrender and due obedience to the Commonwealth of England. That was secured by Claiborne and Bennett, who sailed in the Parliamentary fleet aboard Captain Curtis's ship 'Guinea', and obtained Virginia's peaceful surrender on 12 March 1652. However, Stegg sailed with Captain Dennis and died aboard the 'John' after having written his last will and testament dated 6 October 1651, which was admitted to probate in July 1652. His widow married burgess Thomas Grendon, Jr., and bore a son, Thomas Grendon III. John Lightfoot succeeded him as auditor-general of Virginia, only to soon learn that the King had appointed Digges upon Governor Berkeley's recommendation, and that others objected to such a new immigrant being appointed before ever having been added to the Governor's Council.
