= List of speakers of the Virginia House of Burgesses =

The speaker of the Virginia House of Burgesses was the presiding officer of the House of Burgesses, the lower house of the Virginia General Assembly during the period in which Virginia was a colony of the Kingdom of England and, after 1707, the Kingdom of Great Britain.

The General Assembly itself was first organized in 1619, when the colony was owned and administered by the London Company. Twenty-two burgesses were elected to that Assembly, two each from eleven designated settlement areas in the colony. The Assembly formed a unicameral legislature made up of the burgesses and the appointed members of the Governor's Council, presided over by the Governor, George Yeardley. Yeardley designated his secretary, John Pory, a council member, as Speaker of the General Assembly. Pory, however, appears to have acted only as secretary of the Assembly.

The General (or Grand) Assembly met seventeen more times from that first session through 1642. Its legal standing was put in doubt when the London Company was dissolved in May 1624 and Virginia came under the direct administration of the Crown.

A crisis developed in the spring of 1635 when an unpopular governor, Sir John Harvey, was arrested and deported to England by his own Council. This led to the February 1639 reappointment of former Governor Sir Francis Wyatt. Wyatt's instructions acknowledged the legal status of the General Assembly and of land titles granted by the London Company, ending 15 years of legal limbo.

In late 1642 Sir William Berkeley was appointed Governor. He reorganized the Assembly into two houses along the lines of the English Parliament. The new lower house, the House of Burgesses, was to provide a counterweight to the Council-led group that had deposed Harvey. However, they maneuvered to elect one of their own, Thomas Stegg, as the first Speaker of the new House when it convened in March 1643.

Speaker Peyton Randolph supported independence in the 1770s. The House of Burgesses was called back by the Royal Governor Lord Dunmore one last time in June 1775 to address British Prime Minister Lord North's Conciliatory Resolution. Randolph, who was a delegate to the Continental Congress, returned to Williamsburg to take his place as Speaker. The House of Burgesses rejected the proposal, which was also later rejected by the Continental Congress. The burgesses met in conventions that served as a revolutionary provisional government for Virginia. Randolph served as the president of the conventions until his death in October 1775. The burgesses did not elect a new speaker, but did elect a new president for the conventions. They passed the role of the House of Burgesses to the House of Delegates when they adopted the Constitution of Virginia in June 1776.

Speakers of the House of Burgesses Those with non-consecutive terms are italicized
No.	Speaker	Term	County or city
Under the Kingdom of England
1	Thomas Stegg (d. 1652)	1643	Charles City County
2	Edward Hill Sr. (d. ca. 1663)	1644–1645	Charles City County
3	Edmund Scarborough (ca. 1617–1671)	1645	Northampton County
4	Ambrose Harmer (d. ca. 1647)	1646	James City County
5	Thomas Harwood (d. 1652)	1647–1649	Warwick County
6	Edward Major (1615–ca. 1655)	1652	Nansemond County
7	Thomas Dew (d. ca. 1691)	1652	Nansemond County
8	Walter Chiles (d. 1653)	1653	James City County
9	William Whitby (d. 1655)	1653	Warwick County
2	Edward Hill Sr.	1654–1655	Charles City County
10	Francis Moryson (bef. 1628–1680/81)	1656	James City County
11	John Smith also known as Francis Dade (1620–1663)	1658	Warwick County
2	Edward Hill Sr.	1659	Charles City County
12	Theodorick Bland (1629–1671/72)	1660	Charles City County
13	Henry Soane (d. 1661)	1661	James City County
14	Robert Wynne (1622–1675)	1662–1674	Charles City County
15	Augustine Warner Jr. (1642/43–1681)	1676	Gloucester County
16	Thomas Godwin (d. 1677/78)	1676	Nansemond County
15	Augustine Warner Jr.	1677	Gloucester County
17	William Travers (d. 1679)	1677	Rappahannock County
18	Mathew Kemp (d. 1682)	1679	Gloucester County
19	Thomas Ballard (1630–1690)	1680–1682	James City County
20	Edward Hill, Jr. (1637–1700)	1684	Charles City County
21	William Kendall (1621–1686)	1685	Northampton County
22	Arthur Allen (d. 1710)	1686–1688	Surry County
23	Thomas Milner (d. 1694)	1691–1693	Nansemond County
24	Philip Ludwell Jr. (1672–1726/27)	1695–1696	James City County
25	Robert Carter (1662/63–1732)	1696–1697	Lancaster County
26	William Randolph (1650–1771)	1698	Henrico County
25	Robert Carter	1699	Lancaster County
27	Peter Beverley (ca. 1668–1728)	1700–1705	Gloucester County
28	Benjamin Harrison III (1673–1710)	1705–1706	Charles City County
Under the Kingdom of Great Britain
27	Peter Beverley	1710–1714	Gloucester County
29	Daniel McCarty (1679–1724)	1715–1716	Westmoreland County
30	John Holloway (ca. 1666–1734)	1720–1734	1720–22: York County
30	John Holloway (ca. 1666–1734)	1720–1734	1723–26: Williamsburg
30	John Holloway (ca. 1666–1734)	1720–1734	1728–34: York County
31	Sir John Randolph (ca. 1693–1737)	1734–1736	Williamsburg
32	John Robinson Jr. (1705–1766)	1738–1765	King and Queen County
33	Peyton Randolph (1721–1775)	1766–1775	Williamsburg

== See also ==
- John Robinson estate scandal
- List of members of the Virginia House of Burgesses
- List of speakers of the Virginia House of Delegates
