= William Whitby =

17th century Colony of Virginia politician

9th Speaker of the Virginia House of Burgesses
- In office 1653–1653
- Preceded by: Walter Chiles
- Succeeded by: Edward Hill, Sr.

Member of the House of Burgesses representing Warwick River
- In office 1652-1655 Serving with Samuel Mathews Jr.
- Preceded by: Thomas Harwood
- Succeeded by: Thomas Davis
- In office March 1644 Serving with John Walker
- Preceded by: Thomas Flint
- Succeeded by: Thomas Bernard,
- In office 1642 Serving with Thomas Harwood, Thomas Barnett
- Preceded by: Thomas Flint
- Succeeded by: Thomas Flint

Personal details
- Born: fl. 1640 England
- Died: March–October 1655
- Spouse: Katherine Gorsuch
- Children: William Whitby Jr.

William Whitby (d. between March and October 1655) emigrated from England to the Virginia colony where he became politician and major landowner. He represented Warwick County as a burgess several times, and became Speaker of the Virginia House of Burgesses in the 1653 session.

== Early and family life ==
Whitby emigrated from England, but his religious inclinations are unclear. His wife, the former Katherine Gorsuch, was the daughter of Royalist Rev. John Gorsuch, the rector of Walkern parish in Hertfordshire from 1633 until 1642. However, several Virginia members of the family would later emigrate to the Maryland colony because of their Quaker faith. They had a son also named William, who chose Capt. Thomas Todd as his guardian and reached legal age, but died childless.

== Career ==
During the 1640s, Whitby was a justice of the peace in Warwick County (the justices jointly administering the county in that era, in addition to judicial duties). He owned land near the mouth of Waters Creek, but by March 1655 rented a rowhouse in Jamestown (which was a few miles upstream from Warwick County, as well as the seat of government). Whitby also bought land near the head of Tindall's Creek and he and George Ludlow bought land near Gloucester Point from Argoll Yeardley, which he sold to Richard Lee I in July 1653. During the tobacco land boom, Whitby patented thousands of acres of land in Warwick County, as well as north across the York and Rappahannock Rivers in the Middle Peninsula and Northern Neck. Warwick County voters first elected Whitby as one of their representatives in the House of Burgesses in 1642, and he also served in one of the sessions in 1644. Following Virginia's acceptance of Parliament's authority during the English Civil War, Whitby and Samuel Mathews Jr. were elected and re-elected as burgesses for Warwick County. In the 1653 session, following the resignation of Walter Chiles (who served as speaker only one day that session), fellow burgesses elected Whitby as Speaker over former Speaker (and Governor Bennet's friend and neighbor) Edward Major.

== Death and legacy ==
When Whitby died, his son was a teenager, and so was allowed to choose his guardian, and chose Thomas Todd to perform that function. His widow may have had financial problems in the early 1670s, for Theophilus Hone filed a lawsuit against her on May 26, 1671. In 1675, the General Court ruled that Whitby's land could not be sold to pay his debts until his son reached legal age, and reviewed his father's accounts. The younger William Whitby apparently fulfilled his own indenture as a servant to Robert Beverley, whom he named as an executor when he made his will in 1676 (which was accepted into probate in July 1677, so his role in Bacon's Rebellion is unclear). The younger William Whitby identified himself as a planter who lived on the Piankatank River in Middlesex County.
