= William Hatcher (politician) =

American politician

William Hatcher was an English immigrant to America and a member of the Virginia House of Burgesses.

== Family lineage ==
William Hatcher (abt. 1613 - bef 1680) emigrated from England. However, his family lineage is not known. The Hatcher Families Genealogy Association states, "It is commonly believed that William Hatcher descended from the Careby Hatchers of Lincolnshire, England, and many books and family trees record this belief, some claiming his father to be a Thomas Hatcher, others claiming William Hatcher. But none can provide even a shred of documentation to support this claim."

== Henrico County, Virginia ==
Hatcher came into the American Colonies about 1635, settling in as a resident of Henrico County, Virginia. On June 1, 1636, he received a patent for land for the importation of himself and three others into the colony. In the land grant office in Richmond, Virginia, are recorded the several grants of land issued to this William Hatcher, in Book 1, page 433, 850 acres; Book 1, page 559, 150 acres; and, Book 6, page 529, 227 acres.

== House of Burgesses ==
In their beginnings in Henrico County, the Hatchers were very well to do people, and William Hatcher became a member of the House of Burgesses from Henrico County. He served in the capacity of Burgess in 1644, 1645, 1646, 1649, and 1652 William was a very outspoken person with a high temper and was disciplined in the House and Court for his comments and actions.

=== House Session of November 1654 ===
At the beginning of the Session of November 1654, the House of Burgesses made the following order:

"Whereas, Coll. Edward Hill, unanimously chosen speaker of this house, was afterwards maliciously reported by William Hatcher to be an atheist and a blasphemer...And foreasmuch as the said William Hatcher...hath also reported, That the mouth of this house was a Devil...It is therefore ordered by this house, that the said William Hatcher, upon his knees, make a humble acknowledgement of his offence unto the said Coll. Edward Hill and Burgesses of this Assembly; which accordingly was performed, and then he, the said Hatcher, dismist paying his ffees.”

Speaker Edward Hill, Sr.

== His Majestie's Court ==
William Hatcher was again Burgess in March 1658-9. So far as extant records show, this was his last public service; but the temper which induced him to denounce Speaker Hill in 1654 got him into trouble again at the time of Bacon's Rebellion.

=== Court Hearing of March 15, 1676 ===
At a court held by the Governor and Council, March 15, 1676-7:

"William Hatcher being brought forth before the court for uttering divers mutinous words tending to the disquiett of this his Majesty's countrey, and it being evidently made appeare what was layd to his charge by divers oaths, and a Jury being impanelled to assesse the damages, who bring the verdict that they award te said Hatcher to pay ten thousand pounds of tobacco and caske, which verdict of the jury this honourable court doth confirme; but in respect the said Hatcher is an aged man, the court doth order that the said Hatcher doe pay with all expedition eight thousand pounds of drest pork unto his Majestie's commander of his forces in Henrico county, for the supply of the souldiers, which if he fayle to doe, that he pay eight thousand pounds of tobacco and caske the next cropp, and pay costs."

Governor Sir William Berkeley
