= Walter Chiles =

Virginia politician and merchant

8th Speaker of the Virginia House of Burgesses
- In office July 5, 1653 – July 6, 1653
- Preceded by: Thomas Dew
- Succeeded by: William Whitby

Member of the Virginia Governor's Council
- In office 1651

Member of the House of Burgesses representing James City County
- In office 1653 Serving with Henry Soane, Abraham Watson, William Whittaker
- Preceded by: Robert Wetherall
- Succeeded by: Thomas Dipnall
- In office 1649 Serving with William Barrett, John Dunston, George Read, Thomas Swann, William Whitaker
- Preceded by: Bridges Freeman
- Succeeded by: John Fludd
- In office 1645-1646 Serving with John Flood, Ambrose Harmer, Peter Ridley, George Stevens, George Jordan, Thomas Lovinge, Robert Shepeard
- Preceded by: William Barrett
- Succeeded by: William Davis

Member of the House of Burgesses representing Charles City County
- In office 1642-1643 Serving with Walter Aston, Edward Hill, Joseph Johnson, Thomas Stegg
- Preceded by: Francis Eppes
- Succeeded by: John Bishop

Personal details
- Born: 20 March 1607 Bristol, England
- Died: 1653 (aged 45–46) Jamestown, Colony of Virginia
- Spouse: Elizabeth
- Children: Walter Chiles Jr.
- Occupation: Merchant, planter, politician, soldier

Military service
- Branch/service: Virginia militia
- Unit: Lieutenant colonel

Walter Chiles (died 1653) was an English merchant who emigrated to the Colony of Virginia where in addition to his business interests, he became a prominent planter, military officer and politician who at times represented Charles City County and James City County in the House of Burgesses, as well as briefly served on the Virginia Governor's Council and as Speaker of the House of Burgesses until removed by Governor WIlliam Berkeley because of a conflict of interest in ongoing litigation.

== Early life ==
Chiles was born in Bristol, England, and sailed to the Colony of Virginia with his wife and at least two of their sons.

== Career ==
Chiles moved to Virginia around 1638 and immediately invested in real estate, patenting 400 acres in Charles City County along the Appomattox River, using as headrights his wife Elizabeth, sons Walter and William, and four other people for whose passage he paid. In 1649, he patented another 813 acres in what was then Charles City County, but which lay on the other side of the James (and Appomattox) Rivers in what became Prince George County. A March 23, 1649 document identifies Chiles as a merchant; it memorialized the sale to him by Governor William Berkeley of a lot in urban Jamestown (the seat of James City County and of the colony's government) with a brick house that had previously housed Secretary Richard Kemp and later Sir Francis Wyatt. Chiles made it his residence, and also acquired several other lots, as well as 70 acres at Black Point on the island's eastern end. Chiles also purchased servants from William Edwards.

Chiles also owned at least one ship, the Fame of Virginia which was confiscated by a privateer Capt. Richard Husband near Northumberland County, for having sailed from Rotterdam without a license (or for trading with the enemy during the periodic Anglo-Dutch wars). Despite a Northampton Court's order to release the vessel to Chiles, Capt. Husband sailed it from the colony, in a dispute that reached the General Assembly while Chiles was a candidate for its speakership, as discussed below.

Charles City County voters first elected Chiles as one of their representatives in the House of Burgesses in 1642, and re-elected him, but by 1645, he had become one of the elected representatives for nearly James City County. Chiles had clearly moved to James City County by 1646, and on and off from 1645 to 1653, he represented that county as a burgess. Chiles also served at least briefly in the legislature's upper house, the Governor's Council, having taken an oath of office in 1651 (the same year in which he took an oath as Lieutenant Colonel of militia), but was removed the following year because of his involvement in illegal trading with the Netherlands. Nonetheless, fellow burgesses elected Chiles Speaker of the Virginia House of Burgesses at the July 1653 session, but Governor Bennett forced his resignation the following day, based on his conflict of interest in the upcoming maritime case.

== Death and legacy ==
Chiles died, probably in Jamestown and probably in the winter of 1654-1655. His son and principal heir, Walter Chiles II also served as a burgess, representing James City County thrice beginning in 1659. He married Mary Page, daughter of Col. John Page, likewise a merchant and member of the Virginia House of Burgesses.
