= George Augustine Washington (nephew of George Washington) =

American soldier and nephew of George Washington

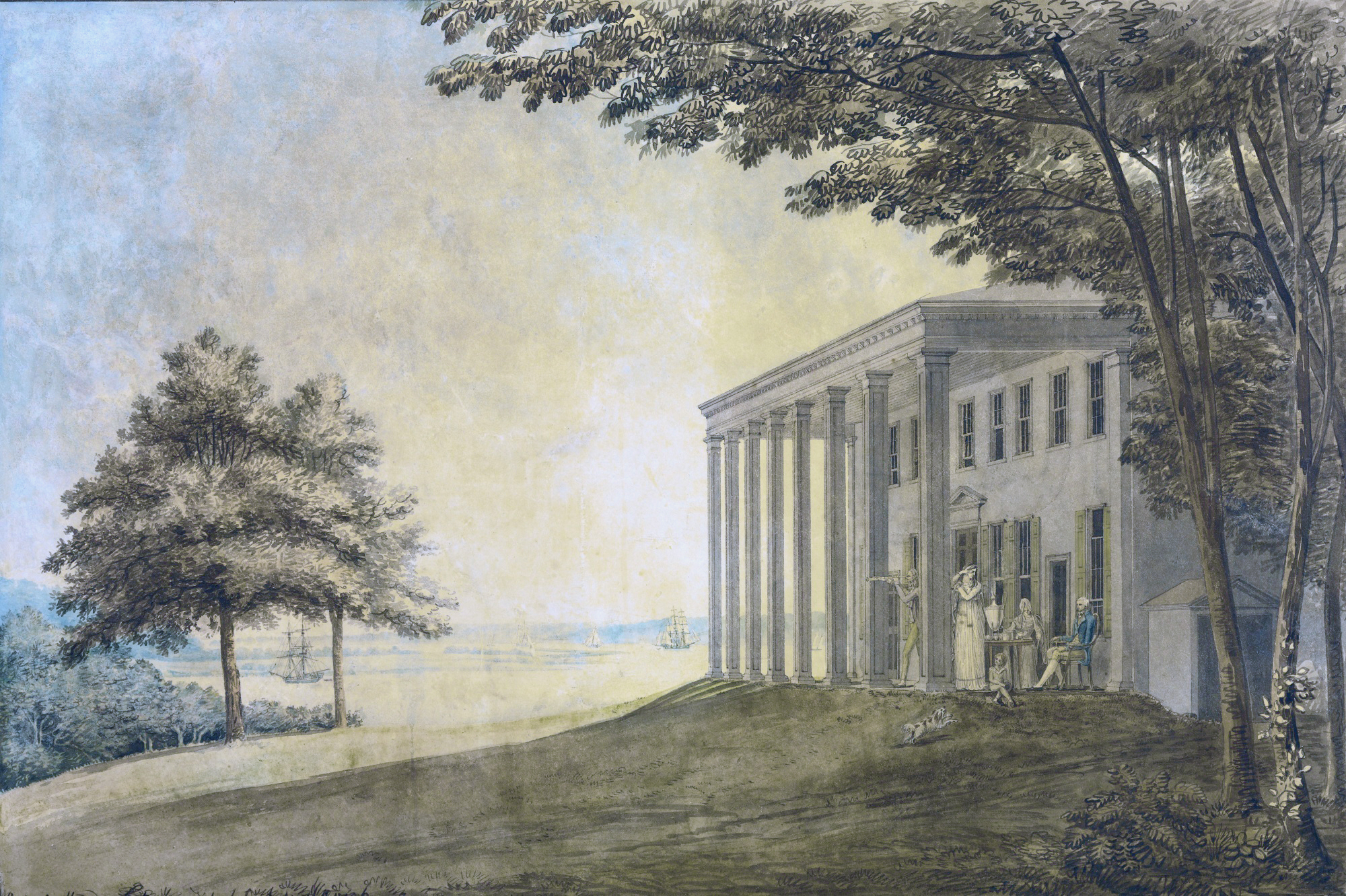
- Mount Vernon, a 1796 painting by Benjamin Henry Latrobe
- Born: c. 1759; Fredericksburg, Virginia
- Died: February 5, 1793
- Spouse: Frances “Fanny” Bassett
- Children: 4
- Parent(s): Charles Washington; Mildred Thornton Washington
- Family: Washington family

George Augustine Washington (c. 1759 – February 5, 1793) was a nephew of George Washington who served as manager of the Mount Vernon estate from 1786 to 1791. He also served as an officer in the American Revolutionary War, including as a cavalry soldier, as part of Washington's guard, and as an aide-de-camp to the Marquis de Lafayette.

== Early life and military career ==
George Augustine Washington was born around 1759. He was the firstborn of George Washington's youngest brother Charles and Mildred Thornton Washington. Little is known of his early life other than he grew up in or near Fredericksburg, Virginia. In 1777, at approximately age 18, he was offered a junior officer’s commission in a light horse regiment of the Continental Army. In 1778 he was commissioned as a Cornet under the command of Major Henry "Light-Horse Harry" Lee, the father of Robert E. Lee. At the end of 1778 he resigned his commission, probably due to poor health. The following summer he returned as an aide-de-camp at General Washington’s headquarters, then was commissioned as an Ensign in the 2nd Virginia Regiment in February 1780 and was detached for duty with the Commander-in-Chief’s Guard.

Some months later, when the Marquis de Lafayette was appointed to the command of a light infantry division, he invited George Augustine Washington to serve as an aide-de-camp on his staff. Young Washington fought with Lafayette’s corps in Virginia during the summer of 1781. He also played a role in the siege of the British Army at the battle of Yorktown in October 1781.

When the Marquis de Lafayette returned to France in December of 1781, George Augustine Washington resumed duty with the Commander-in-Chief’s military guard. Ill health forced him to give up his military duties again in the spring of 1782. He was plagued by illness, probably tuberculosis, throughout much of his adult life.

== Mount Vernon ==
For the next three years, George Augustine Washington traveled to a number of locations along the east coast of the United States, as well as to Barbados and Bermuda, in an effort to find relief from his illness. George Washington arranged for the support and financial assistance in the different locales of his nephew’s recuperation. In 1785 George Augustine returned to Virginia in better health, but still sickly. In October of that year he married Frances “Fanny” Bassett, a favorite niece of Martha Washington, in a ceremony at Mount Vernon. George and Martha Washington were fond of the couple and invited them to reside with them at the estate, which they did. In 1786 George and Martha Washington gave the newlyweds over two thousand acres of land which was part of the estate. The couple had at least four children.

Although George Washington largely ran the estate himself when he was present, the daily supervision of Mount Vernon had been the responsibility of Lund Washington, a distant cousin of Washington's, since the mid 1760's. Lund stepped down from the position in 1785 and George Augustine Washington took over the job in the spring of 1786. The farms that constituted Mount Vernon by that time had grown to 7,000 acres.

In May 1787 George Washington travelled to Philadelphia for four months to attend the Constitutional Convention. During this time he wrote frequent and voluminous letters to his nephew regarding the agricultural operations at Mount Vernon. For example, two days after the convention opened, he asked his nephew if he had "tried both fresh and salt fish as a manure" and recommended that he plant buckwheat. The two men consulted constantly about the operation of the estate during George Augustine's time there, on everything from crop rotation to mule breeding.

In April 1789, when George Washington travelled to New York City to assume his duties as the first President of the United States, he entrusted George Augustine “with the general management of all my concerns,”. A guest visiting Mount Vernon during this time described George Augustine as a “handsome, genteel, attentive man.” Nonetheless, the sickness that had afflicted him while he was a soldier returned. His health continued to steadily deteriorate. By October 1791 he was so ill he could scarcely ride a horse, and despite their trusted relationship, Washington asked him to step down from his position, replacing him with his secretary Robert Lewis.

== Death and legacy ==
George Augustine Washington died on February 5, 1793, at Eltham, the estate of his late father-in-law in New Kent County, Virginia. His passing affected his uncle George, who acknowledged, “Altho’ it had been long expected... I have felt it very keenly.” His remains were interred in the Washington family vault at Mount Vernon on April 11, 1793. Despite his many duties as President, George Washington acted as executor of his nephew's estate.

In his will, George Washington left legacies to the three surviving children of George Augustine and Fanny Washington, Anna Maria, George Fayette, and Charles Augustine Washington, stating: “as on account of the affection I had for, and the obligation I was under to, their father when living, who from his youth had attached himself to my person, and followed my fortunes through the viscissitudes [sic] of the late Revolution - afterwards devoting his time to the Superintendence of my private concerns for many years… thereby affording me essential Services, and always performing them in a manner the most felial and respectful.” After being widowed, Fanny married Tobias Lear, Washington’s secretary, in 1795. She died, however, only one year later, also of tuberculosis.

== Ancestry ==
Ancestors of Charles Washington

16. Lawrence Washington
8. John Washington
17. Amphyllis Twigden
4. Lawrence Washington
18. Nathaniel Pope
9. Anne Pope
19. Lucy (Luce) Fox
2. Augustine Washington
20. Augustine Warner
10. Augustine Warner Jr.
21. Mary Towneley
5. Mildred Warner
22. George Reade
11. Mildred Read
23. Elizabeth Martian (Martiau)
1. Charles Washington
24. William Ball
12. William Ball
25. Dorothy Tuttle
6. Joseph Ball
26. Thomas Atherold
13. Hannah Atherold
27. Mary Harvey
3. Mary Ball
28. Peter Montague
14. Peter Montague
29. Cicely Matthews
7. Mary Montague
30. Meindert Doodes
15. Mary Doodes
31.Mary Garrett (or Geret)
