= Appleby Grammar School =

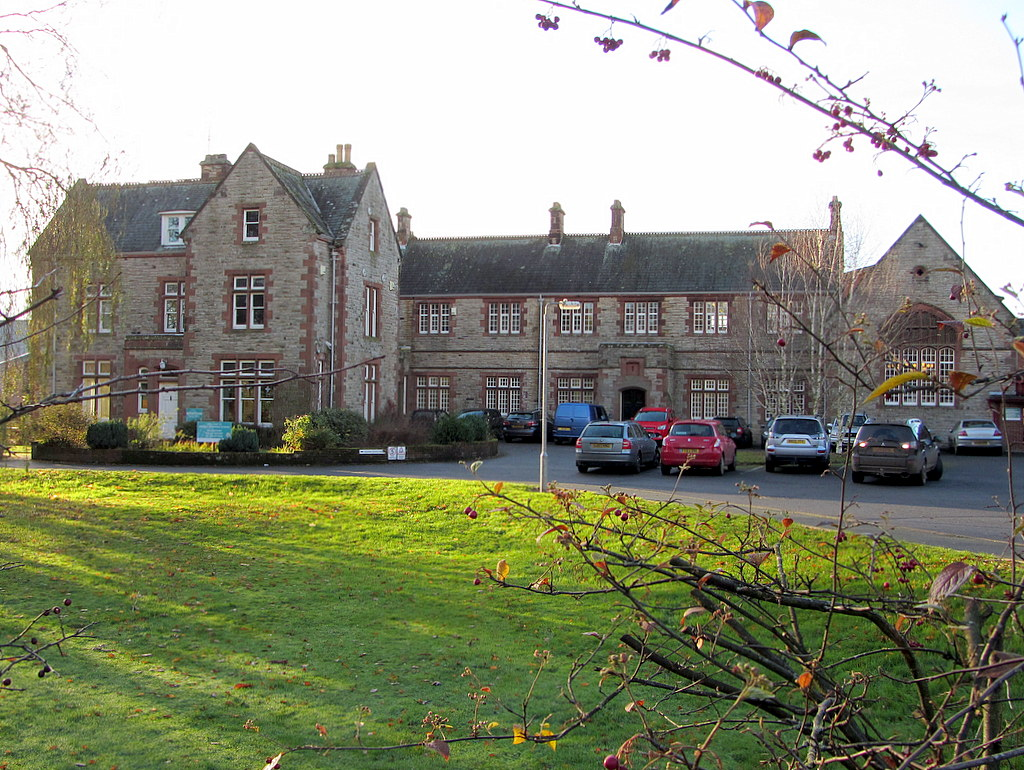
- Appleby Grammar School in December 2014

Location
- Battlebarrow; Appleby-in-Westmorland, Cumbria, CA16 6XU; England
- 54.5819°N 2.4916°W

Information
- Type: Comprehensive; Academy
- Local authority: Westmorland and Furness
- Department for Education URN: 137251 Tables
- Ofsted: Reports
- Head teacher: Phil Nicholson
- Staff: 28 + Support Staff
- Gender: Mixed
- Age: 11 to 18
- Enrolment: 653
- Houses: Hastings; Threlkelds; Yates; Whiteheads
- Colours: Black and red
- Website: www.appleby.cumbria.sch.uk

Appleby Grammar School is a co-educational comprehensive secondary school and sixth form in Appleby-in-Westmorland for students aged 11 to 18. Since 2011, it has been an Academy. Until 2013, the school was a registered charity.

== History ==
The origins of Appleby Grammar lie in the three chantries established in the town's two medieval churches; those of the Blessed Virgin Mary (founded c. 1260 by William de Goldyngton, Mayor of Appleby) and of St Nicholas (founded in 1334 by Robert de Threlkeld), both in the Church of St Lawrence, and that of the Virgin Mary, founded by William L'English before 1344 in the Church of St Michael, Bongate. These chantries, constituted to celebrate masses for the souls of their founders, were also endowed (as deeds of 1478 and 1518 [WSMB/A] and 1533 show) with monies to enjoin the chaplain to teach a free grammar school in the borough, initially in the church itself, as a part of his duty.

The first mention of a school in Appleby is shown by the sale in 1452 of a burgage house made by John Marshall, Vicar of St Michael's, to Thomas Lord Clifford (also responsible for erecting the greater part of the present Appleby Castle during the reign of Henry VI). The property was described in the sale as "on the west side of Kirkgate extending in length to a certain narrow lane called School-house Gate".

In consideration of the loss sustained by the dissolution of the chantries in the time of Edward VI, Queen Mary I granted to the school at Appleby a yearly rent charge of £5 10s. 8d., its revenues being replaced by a grant payable from the income of the Rectory of Crosby Ravensworth. Further bequests were made from the wills of Robert Langton (Archdeacon of Dorset 1486–1514, educated in Appleby) and Dr. Miles Spencer (d. 1569). These legacies enabled the Borough to purchase Royal Letters Patent, endowed by Queen Elizabeth I in 1574, and so provide a firm basis for the continued establishment and survival of the grammar school, "with ten governors, who are to appoint successors, nominate the master and usher, make statutes for the regulation of the school, and receive lands and possessions, so as they exceed not the clear yearly value of £40" (though this limitation has been greatly exceeded).

The incumbent headmaster in 1574, John Boste, later a Catholic convert and martyr (canonised by Pope Paul VI in 1970 as one of the Forty Martyrs of England and Wales) was followed in 1580 by Reginald Bainbrigg, a considerable scholar, who made tours of Hadrian's Wall in 1599 and 1601 and corresponded with William Camden and Sir Robert Cotton on antiquarian matters. On his death (c.1613) he bequeathed some 295 volumes to the school library, which grew considerably in size as witnessed by the catalogues of 1656, 1782 and 1847. Its funds were augmented each year by contributions from departing pupils. The library is now in the care of the University Library of Newcastle-upon-Tyne.

Official criticism of the school in 1869 by the Schools Inquiry Commission (1864–1868), which examined endowed grammar schools under the chairmanship of Lord Taunton, revealed an uncertain future as a high grade classical school. In 1868, there were only 16 pupils attending but by 1880 there were 80 boarders alone.

Fruitless proposals were made by the governors to rebuild and amend the existing buildings, and in 1887 construction of a new school was completed at Battlebarrow, on the outskirts of the town, on a site provided by land purchased from St Anne's Hospital and Lord Hothfield. A new scheme for the administration of the school along more modern lines was implemented in 1891. Thereafter, there followed a steady growth in pupil numbers, from 45 in 1887, 68 in 1914, 135 in 1940 to 170 in 1955, when girls were first admitted.

In the early 1950s, because of the large size of the catchment area and problems students would face under adverse weather conditions, there were Government proposals for comprehensive education to be provided on larger sites, for pupils of all academic abilities, offering modern and technical courses. Westmorland County Council (1889–1974) suggested a development plan for North Westmorland, which was considered and agreed upon by the governors of both Appleby and Kirkby Stephen Grammar Schools, for defined catchment areas to be set in place. Appleby would take pupils from an area including Appleby, Asby, the fellside villages and villages west of the A66. The catchment area would eventually extend to Cliburn, Morland, Newby, Reagill and Sleagill.

In 1955, an extension at Appleby was completed to accommodate domestic science, woodwork, science and art rooms, and a girls' cloakroom was added to the ground floor. A new school was also completed at Kirkby Stephen, both schools becoming co-educational for the 1955–56 academic year and Appleby ceasing to take boarders.

In 1959, while retaining the title of grammar school, Appleby and Kirkby Stephen schools became comprehensive and expanded rapidly so that, by 1974, 400 years after the establishment of the Elizabethan post-chantry grammar school, there were over 560 pupils on the school roll.

== George Washington ==
The father, probably, and two half-brothers, definitely, of the founding President of the United States, George Washington, attended the school.

On his death, the widow of Washington's paternal grandfather Lawrence Washington of Virginia, Mildred (née Warner), married George Gale. The Gale family were the chief tobacco merchants of Whitehaven, Cumberland. In 1700, pregnant, Mildred Gale moved with her new husband and three children, John (6), Augustine (3), and Mildred (an infant), to Whitehaven. In 1701, Mildred died in childbirth; she was buried in St Nicholas Churchyard in Whitehaven. Mildred's sister, Mary, is an ancestor of Queen Elizabeth II. George Gale sent the boys to board at Appleby Grammar until custody of the children was successfully challenged by the Washington family, and the boys returned to Virginia, to live near Chotank Creek.

Washington's father, Augustine, chose to enroll his two sons from his first marriage to Jane Butler, Lawrence and Augustine, at Appleby Grammar. George was the first son of his second marriage to Mary Ball. Were it not for the sudden death of his father in 1743, on reaching the age at which the two older boys had made the long voyage from Virginia, George would have most certainly followed in their footsteps.

== Ofsted and academic performance ==
In 2008, Appleby Grammar School was one of five Cumbrian schools presented with the DCSF International School Award in recognition of links with schools abroad. It was rated 'Good' in its Ofsted inspection in the same year. In the 2011 Ofsted inspection, the school was rated as 'Satisfactory'. In 2013 and again in 2016, Ofsted report's determined that the school required improvement.

In April 2022, the school was graded as 'Good' in all areas.

== Notable former pupils ==
- Sir John Lowther, 1st Baronet (1605–1675) — an English lawyer, landowner and politician who sat in the House of Commons for Westmorland in 1628 and in 1660.
- Bishop Thomas Barlow (1607/8–1691) — an English academic and clergyman who became Provost of The Queen's College, Oxford and Bishop of Lincoln.
- Bishop Thomas Smith (1615–1702) — Dean of Carlisle (1672–1684) and Bishop of Carlisle (1684–1702).
- Augustine Washington (1694–1743) — father of George Washington.
- Augustine Washington Jr. (1720–1762) — half brother of George Washington.
- Lawrence Washington (1718–1752) — half brother of founding U.S. President George Washington.
- James Whitehead (1834–1917) — Lord Mayor of London (1888–89).
- John Percival (1834–1918) — educator and Bishop of Hereford (1895–1918).
- Gavin Skelton (born 1981) — footballer.
- Helen Skelton (born 1983) — television presenter.
- Chloe Wilcox (born 1986) — Great Britain Water Polo.

== Bibliography ==
- Edgar Hinchcliffe (1974). Appleby Grammar School: From Chantry to Comprehensive. J. Whitehead and Son (Appleby) Limited for the Governors. ISBN 0-95-017473-4.
- John Flavel Curwen (1932). The Later Records Relating to North Westmorland Or the Barony of Appleby. Volume 8 of Record series. Titus Wilson & Son.
- Andrew Connell (2013), 'John Robinson (1727–1802), Richard Atkinson (1739–85), Government, Commerce and Politics in the Age of the American Revolution: "From the North"'. Northern History, Volume L. No.1 (March 2013), pp. 54–76. Many Publishing, University of Leeds.
