= Samuel Washington =

American politician (1734–1781)

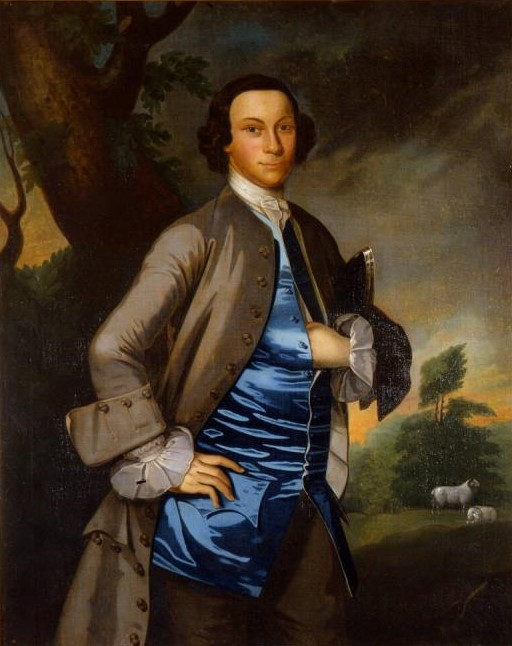
- Portrait by James Alexander Simpson after John Hesselius, 1855
- Born: November 16, 1734; Wakefield Plantation, Pope's Creek, Colony of Virginia, British America
- Died: September 26, 1781 (aged 46); Harewood Plantation, Berkeley County, Virginia (now Jefferson County, West Virginia)
- Spouses: Jane Champe (m. 1754; died 1755) Mildred Thornton (m. 1756; died 1762) Lucy Chapman (m. 1762; died 1763) Anne Steptoe (m. 1764; died 1777) Susannah Perrin (m. 1778)
- Children: 9, including George, Lawrence
- Parent(s): Augustine Washington; Mary Ball Washington
- Family: Washington family

Samuel Washington (November 16, 1734 – September 26, 1781) was an American planter, politician and military officer best known for being the younger brother of George Washington, the first president of the United States.

== Early life ==
Washington was born in at his father's Wakefield Plantation on Pope's Creek, in Westmoreland County, Colony of Virginia, in November 1734. He was the second son born to Mary Ball Washington and Augustine Washington. George Washington was his eldest full brother, but he also had elder half brothers from this father's first marriage: Lawrence Washington and Augustine Washington Jr. (Jane Washington, his half-sister, died shortly after his birth.) His other full siblings were Elizabeth Washington Lewis, John Augustine Washington, Charles Washington and Mildred Washington (who died young).

His father died when he was eight years old, and unlike his half-brothers, he did not travel to Britain for higher education, but received the best education his family could afford in the neighborhood (there being no public schools in the era). From 1735 to 1738, he resided with his father, mother and siblings at Mount Vernon, then his father moved the family to Stafford County, where he was raised on Ferry Farm.

Samuel Washington suffered from tuberculosis for much of his life, and would ultimately die from the disease at age 46; three of his four sons who reached adulthood also died of that communicable disease.

== Career ==
Upon reaching legal age, Samuel Washington inherited two pieces of land from his father: one tract of 600 farmed acres in the Potomac River watershed drained by Chotank Creek in northern Stafford County a mile or two west of the Dahlgren Bridge, and a 1,200-acre undeveloped tract in the Rappahannock River watershed drained by Deep Run southwest of Fredericksburg. He ultimately sold these properties, using some of the proceeds to purchase land in the Shenandoah Valley (by September 1770 when he moved across the Blue Ridge mountains he owned 2,500 acres in what was then Frederick County and that in 1772 became Berkeley County). His landholdings north and south of his Harewood plantation house discussed below would eventually reach 3,800 acres.

Washington served in numerous posts in Stafford County, Virginia, including justice of the peace (one of 27 men whose duties ranged from administrative to judicial) from November 1766 until he was listed as removed on July 27, 1767. Either the position or removal may have been caused by his opposition to "taxation without representation", as shown by his being the 5th of 115 signatures on the Westmoreland Resolves against the Stamp Act in February 1766, or because of his travels to develop his western properties. Washington also served as a vestryman of the local parishes (responsible for social services, including carrying for the poor) and was elected warden by the vestry of St. Paul's Parish in Stafford County, and would later become warden of Norborne Parish.

On February 5, 1771, Washington took the oath of office as one of the justices of the Frederick County court (likewise helping to administer that county), and on April 17, 1772 Governor John Murray, 4th Earl of Dunmore appointed Washington as one of the justices of the new Berkeley County court. In 1773 and again in 1776, Washington served as the Berkeley county sheriff. Beginning in 1775, Washington also served as colonel and led the Berkeley County Virginia Militia, but was forced to resign due to ill health on April 3, 1777.

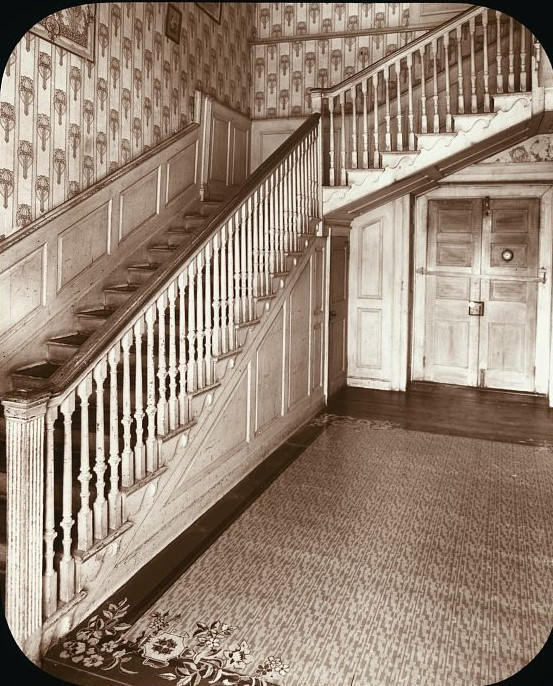
"Harewood," Samuel Washington house, designed by John Ariss in 1770, photographed by Frances Benjamin Johnston, ca. 1930s

He hired by the renowned architect John Ariss to design and in 1770 built Harewood, a Georgian-style mansion near then Charles Town, Virginia. Among prominent visitors to the home were his brother George, Louis Philippe I (later King of the French) and his two brothers, the Duke of Montpensier and the Count of Beaujolais, and the son of the Marquis de Lafayette. Prominent Virginia politician and eventual U.S. president James Madison married his wife Dolley Payne Todd at Harewood, since Dolly's sister, Lucy, had previously been married to one of Samuel's sons.

== Death and legacy ==
Washington died at age 46 from tuberculosis on September 26, 1781, at Harewood in then Berkeley County, Virginia (now Jefferson County, West Virginia) three weeks before the decisive Franco-American victory of Yorktown. He is probably buried on his former estate, in an unmarked grave. When Washington died, most of his children were below legal age, and his brothers who administered his estate discovered he had considerable debts. Through the efforts of his younger brother John Augustine Washington, as well as George Washington, Harewood house remained in the hands of his descendants (and remains today having been listed on the National Register of Historic Places in 1973).

== Personal life ==
Samuel married five times, surviving four wives, and had nine children who reached adulthood. His first marriage around 1754 was to Jane Champe (1724–1755). About two years later, in 1756, after his first wife's death, Washington married his second wife (and first cousin) Mildred Thornton (c. 1741 – c. 1762). She likewise died during or shortly after childbirth, possibly tuberculosis contracted from her husband progressed rapidly after the births. Her cousin, also named Mildred Thornton, married Samuel's younger brother Charles. Together, Mildred and Samuel were the parents of:

- Thornton George Washington (1760–1787), who married twice.
- Tristram Washington (c. 1762), who died young.

After Mildred's death, Washington married for the third time to Lucy Chapman (1743–1763), who also died during childbirth with:

- Infant Washington (1762–1762)

His fourth marriage, in 1764, was to a widow, Anne Steptoe (1737–1777), widow of Willoughby Allerton. This marriage produced four children before she died of complications following a smallpox inoculation during a Berkeley county epidemic during the Revolutionary War, including:

- Ferdinand Steptoe Washington (1767–1788), who died of consumption in Lancaster County.
- George Steptoe Washington (1773–1809), who married Lucy Payne, sister of Dolley Madison, wife of James Madison.
- Lawrence Augustine Washington (1775–1824), who married Mary Dorcas Wood.
- Harriot Washington (1776–1822), who married Andrew Parks of Fredericksburg.

His fifth and final marriage was in 1778 to another widow, Susannah Perrin Holden (1753–1783). Together, Susannah and Samuel were the parents of:

- John Perrin Washington (1781–1784), who died young.

=== Descendants ===
Through his son George, he was the grandfather of Samuel Walter Washington (1799–1831), who married Louisa Clemson, sister of Ambassador Thomas Green Clemson, who served as the United States Superintendent of Agriculture and founded Clemson University in South Carolina.

== Ancestry ==
Ancestors of Samuel Washington

16. Lawrence Washington
8. John Washington
17. Amphyllis Twigden
4. Lawrence Washington
18. Nathaniel Pope
9. Anne Pope
19. Lucy (Luce) Fox
2. Augustine Washington
20. Augustine Warner
10. Augustine Warner Jr.
21. Mary Towneley
5. Mildred Warner
22. George Reade
11. Mildred Read
23. Elizabeth Martian (Martiau)
1. Samuel Washington
24. William Ball
12. William Ball
25. Dorothy Tuttle
6. Joseph Ball
26. Thomas Atherold
13. Hannah Atherold
27. Mary Harvey
3. Mary Ball
28. Peter Montague
14. Peter Montague
29. Cicely Matthews
7. Mary Montague
30. Meindert Doodes
15. Mary Doodes
31.Mary Garrett (or Geret)
