= William Augustine Washington =

American politician

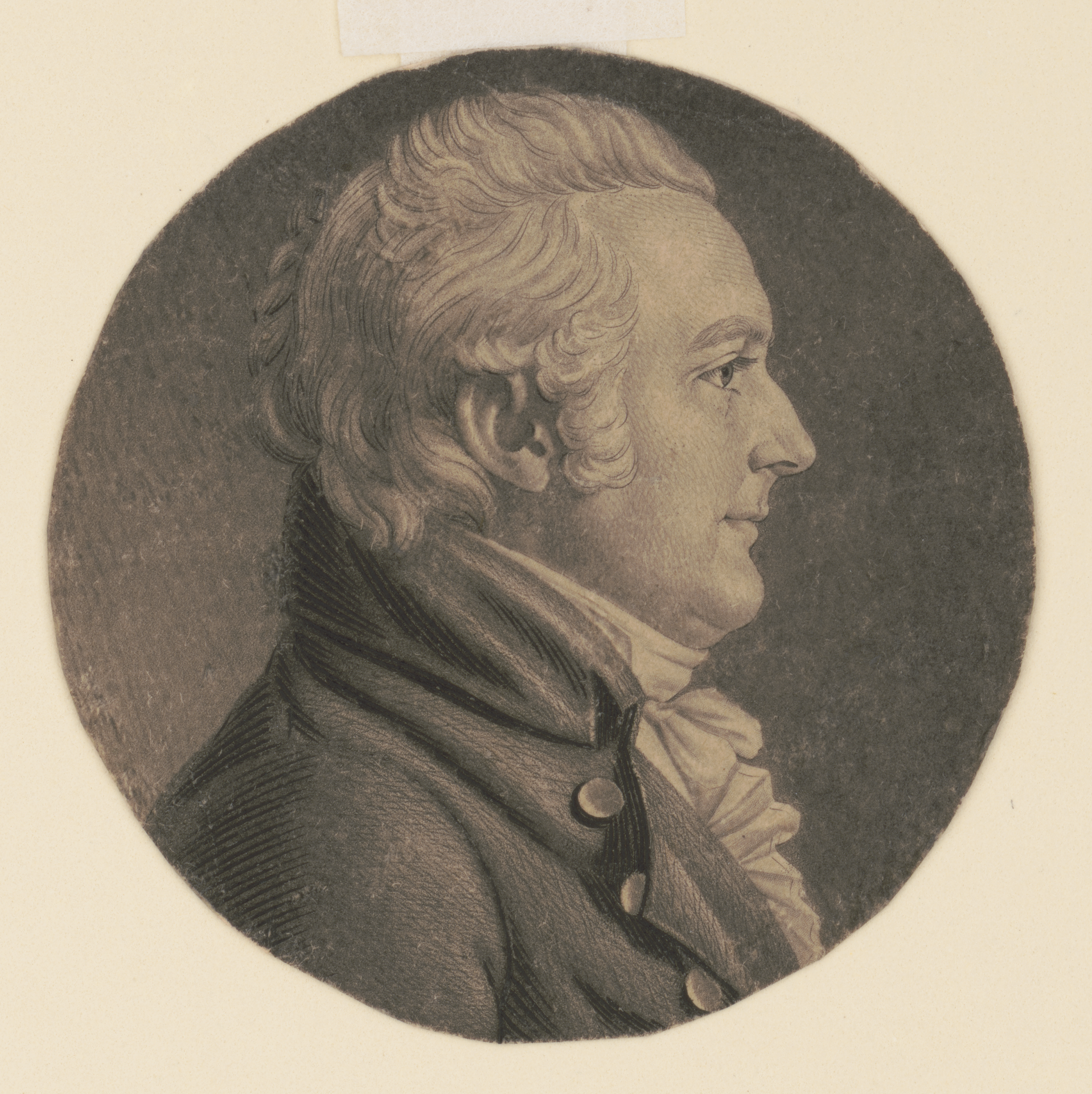
- William Augustine Washington

Member of the Virginia House of Delegates from Westmoreland County
- In office June 23, 1788 – October 18, 1789 Serving with Richard Lee
- Preceded by: Bushrod Washington
- Succeeded by: Henry Lee III

Personal details
- Born: November 25, 1757 Westmoreland, Westmoreland County, Colony of Virginia
- Died: October 2, 1810 (aged 52) "Rock Hill", Georgetown, District of Columbia, U.S.
- Resting place: Mount Vernon, Virginia
- Relations: George Washington (uncle)
- Children: 9, including George Corbin Washington
- Parent(s): Augustine Washington Jr. Anne Aylett
- Occupation: Planter, iron ore mining

Military service
- Allegiance: United States
- Branch/service: Virginia militia
- Years of service: 1776-1781
- Rank: Captain
- Battles/wars: American Revolutionary War

William Augustine Washington (November 25, 1757 – October 2, 1810) was a Virginia planter and officer who served one term in the Virginia House of Delegates representing Westmoreland County, as well as terms as colonel of the county militia and as the county sheriff, before moving to the newly established District of Columbia. The son of the half-brother of President George Washington, he was also one of the seven executors of the former President's estate.

== Early life and military service ==
Born to the former Anne Aylett and her husband Augustine Washington Jr. at his father's (and grandfather's) Wakefield plantation in Westmoreland County, the family included three daughters who reached adulthood: Elizabeth Washington Spotswood (wife of Gen. Alexander Spotswood), Jane Washington Thornton (wife of Col. John Thornton) and Ann Washington Ashton (wife of Burdet Ashton). His uncle George Washington years earlier had been born at Wakefield before his father moved his family to Ferry Farm in nearby Stafford County, Virginia.

He is sometimes confused with a cousin, Col. William Washington who was born in Stafford County and became a military hero in the Battle of Cowpens in South Carolina during the American Revolutionary War. During the American Revolutionary War, this William Washington served as captain in the Westmoreland County militia, protecting the county from offshore British forces but seeing little military action. A firearms accident in 1778 may have also limited his military service, although a decade later he was promoted to Colonel of the Westmoreland County militia and Washington also served at the Westmoreland County sheriff from 1784-1786.

== Career ==
Although then a child, William Washington inherited Wakefield plantation when his father died in 1762 (subject to his mother's right to live there until her death, which happened in 1774). However, the house burned to the ground on Christmas day, 1779. Washington moved his family about a mile inland from the Potomac River, to Blenheim another house on the inherited estate. He reputedly owned 69 slaves in 1782.

In 1783, William Augustine Washington reputedly used bricks from the burnt structure to build a house and brick barn at his nearby Haywood plantation, a 400 acre estate also overlooking the Potomac River. (The barn, also built with recycled Wakefield bricks and noted as historic in 1934 remains today). He also used some of those bricks to enlarge the Blenheim residence.

Westmoreland County voters elected William Augustine Washington as one of their representatives in the Virginia House of Delegates in 1788, when his cousin Bushrod Washington chose not to run for re-election. Washington served part-time alongside veteran Richard Lee and was replaced by his cousin Henry Lee III.

William Washington was a nephew of George Washington and inherited his choice of the General's swords, and also was the first listed of seven executors named in the late President's will, although the active executors were his cousins Bushrod Washington (son of John Augustine Washington, whose legal education General George Washington helped pay for and become the named heir to Mount Vernon plantation) and the late President's former secretary (and husband of his step-daughter Nellie Park Custis), Lawrence Lewis. The other executors were Martha Washington, George Steptoe Washington (son of Samuel Washington), Samuel Washington (son of Charles Washington) and Nellie's brother George Washington Parke Custis (when he reached legal age).

In 1802, William Washington offered the Wakefield property for sale, advertising it as about 6000 acres cultivated as four farms and "peculiarly adapted to the production of Indian corn, wheat and barley." Although the property did not sell until more than a decade after Washington's death, in 1804, Washington moved to "Rock Hill" in the Dumbarton Heights neighborhood of Georgetown neighborhood in the District of Columbia.

== Personal life ==
Washington married three times. His first wife was his cousin Jane Washington (1759–1791), whom he married in 1777. Their children included Hannah Bushrod Washington (1778–1797), Augustine Washington (1780–1798), Ann Aylett Washington Robinson (1783–1800), Bushrod Washington II (1785–1831), Corbin Aylett Washington (1787–1788) and George Corbin Washington (1789–1854). After her death, he married Mary Lee (1764–1795), the daughter of Richard Henry Lee and thus the second cousin of Governor Henry Lee, but no children survived. His third marriage, on May 11, 1799 at "Mansfield" in Spotsylvania County was to Sarah Tayloe (1765–1834), daughter of John Tayloe II of Mount Airy, and sister of John Tayloe III of The Octagon House in Washington, D.C., who survived him. Their daughter Sarah Tayloe Washington (1800–1886) would be the only one of this Washington's children to survive the American Civil War. She married her 4th cousin Lawrence Washington (1791–1875), although their son died as a child in 1803.

== Final years, death and legacy ==
Washington died at his Rock Hill home in the District of Columbia on October 2, 1810. Francis Scott Key was one of the witnesses to his will. His remains were interred at Mount Vernon, where they rest today. His papers may be at the Archives Center of the National Museum of American History.

His eldest surviving son, George Corbin Washington (1789–1854), continued living for the most part in the Dumbarton Heights neighborhood of the federal city. Educated as a lawyer, he became a politician and planter in Maryland. In 1818, G.C. Washington sold the Wakefield property to John Gray (reserving the family's burial ground and the area of the former house); the property returned to the Washington family in 1856 when his granddaughter Elizabeth Washington married John E. Wildson, whose father had purchased it in 1846.

Although the Haywood house that this Washington rebuilt also burned down, Blenheim remains both standing and owned by Washington family members. Washington's daughter by his third wife, Sarah Tayloe Washington, who married her cousin Lawrence Washington, inherited it after her father's death. Although that house deteriorated during the 20th century, it was restored by Lawrence Washington Latane, Jr. and placed on the National Register of Historic Places in 1975.
