= Augustine Washington Jr. =

American planter, military officer and politician (1720–1762)

Member of the House of Burgesses from Westmoreland County
- In office 1754–1758 Serving with John Bushrod, Philip Ludwell Lee, Richard Lee
- Preceded by: Robert Vaulx
- Succeeded by: Richard Henry Lee

Personal details
- Born: 1720 Wakefield plantation, Westmoreland, Westmoreland County, Colony of Virginia, English America
- Died: May 1762 (aged 41–42) Wakefield plantation, Westmoreland County, Colony of Virginia, British America
- Resting place: Popes Creek, Colony of Virginia, British America
- Spouse: Anne Aylett
- Children: 4, including William Augustine Washington
- Parent(s): Augustine Washington; Jane Butler
- Relatives: Washington family
- Occupation: Planter, iron ore mining

Augustine Washington Jr. (1720 – May 1762) was an American planter, military officer and politician best known for being the half-brother of George Washington.

== Early life ==
A member of the Washington family. He was the third and youngest son of Augustine Washington (1694–1743) and, his first wife, Jane Butler (1699–1729). From his parents' marriage, he had an elder brother, Lawrence Washington. After his mother's death in 1729, his father married Mary Ball. From this marriage, he had several younger half-siblings, including George Washington, Elizabeth Washington, Samuel Washington, John Augustine Washington, and Charles Washington.

His paternal grandparents were Lawrence Washington and Mildred Warner (the daughter of Augustine Warner Jr.). After his grandfather's death in 1698, his grandmother remarried to George Gale of Whitehaven, England, a prominent merchant who helped forge trade links between Whitehaven, England and Virginia. His mother, Jane Butler, had inherited about 640 acres (2.6 km^{2}) from her father, Caleb Butler.

== Career ==
According to the will of his father, Augustine Washington Sr., the land now known as Mount Vernon first was willed to this man's elder brother Lawrence Washington. However, the will instructed that in the case Lawrence should die without an heir the property would go to Augustine Jr., provided that he gave the Popes Creek property, known as "Wakefield", to George Washington. Augustine decided instead to keep the Popes Creek property and so George got the property now known as Mount Vernon.

Westmoreland County voters elected Augustine Jr. as one of their representatives in the Virginia House of Burgesses following the death of Robert Vaulx on August 24, 1754, and then elected him to the following term, so he served (part-time) from 1754 to 1758. He also was a member of the Ohio Company.

In 1753, he inherited his brother Lawrence's share in Accokeek Furnace near Stafford, Virginia.

== Personal life ==
In 1743 at "Nominy Plantation," Washington was married to Anne Aylett (1724–1774), the daughter and co-heiress of William Aylett of Westmoreland County, Virginia, and Anne Hardridge (née Ashton) Aylett. Together, they had six children, four of whom survived to adulthood, including:

- Lawrence Washington (1745–1745), who died young.
- Augustine Washington III (1747–1747), who died young.
- Elizabeth Lewis "Bettie" Washington (1749–1814), who married Gen. Alexander Spotswood, a son of Col. John Spotswood (son of Maj.-Gen. Alexander Spotswood, the Colonial Governor of Virginia from 1710 to 1722) and Mary West Dandridge (a cousin of Martha Washington), in 1769.
- Anne "Nancy" Washington (1752–1777), who married Burdett Ashton, a member of the Virginia Ratifying Convention and House of Delegates who was a son of Charles Ashton and Sarah Butler, in 1768.
- Jane Augusta Washington (1756–1833), who married her second cousin Col. John Thornton, a son of Col. Francis Thornton III and Frances Gregory, in 1784.
- William Augustine Washington (1757–1810), who would follow in his father's footsteps as a planter and represented Westmoreland County in the Virginia House of Delegates in 1788; he married his cousin Jane "Jenny" Washington, a daughter of John Augustine Washington, in 1777. After her death in 1791, he married Mary Lee, the daughter of Richard Henry Lee. After her death in 1795, he married Sarah Tayloe, a daughter of John Tayloe II of Mount Airy, in 1799.

Washington died at Wakefield plantation, Westmoreland County in May 1762 and was buried at Popes Creek.
