= History of Popes Creek (Virginia) =

Popes Creek is a small tidal tributary stream of the Potomac River in Westmoreland County, Virginia. The George Washington Birthplace National Monument lies adjacent to Popes Creek estuary.

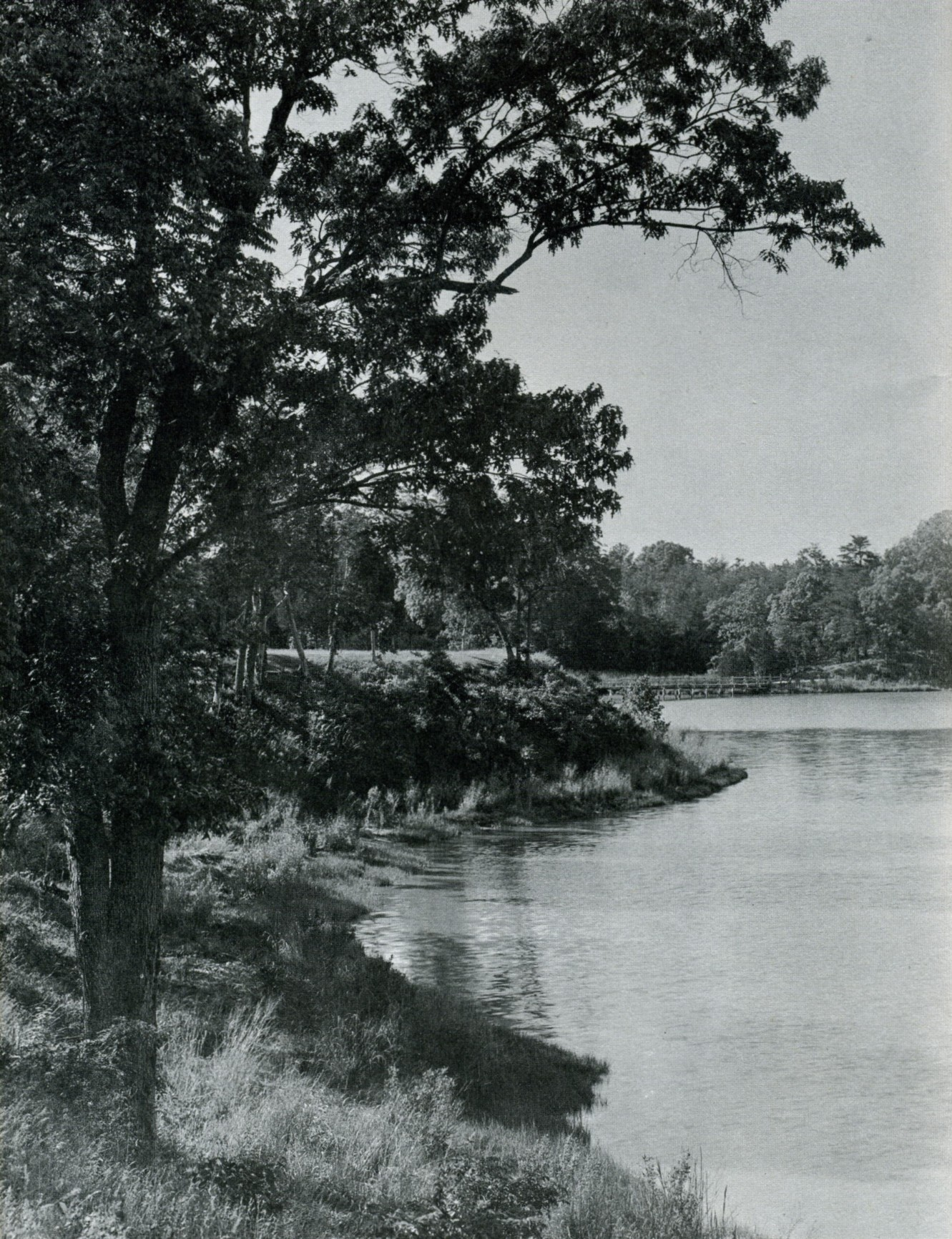
A scene along Popes Creek, 200 feet (61 m) from the birthplace of George Washington.

== Variant names ==
The following variant names for the creek have been listed:

- Cedar Creek
- Cedar Island Creek
- Fishing Creek
- Mister Pope's Creek
- Pope Creek
- Popes Creek

== History ==
A patent for 1,200 acres (4.9 km^{2}) was issued on February 24, 1643, to Edward Murfey and John Vaughan. It is said to be the first patent for land that became Westmoreland County. It bounded on the "Easternmost side of Cedar Island Creek." The name is suggestive of the several little islands that dominate the mouth of the creek.

Governor Berkeley's treaty of peace after the end of the 1646 War with Opechancanough prohibited all emigration to the north side of the Rappahannock River. When this restriction was repealed in 1648, immigrants poured in from England, Maryland, New England, and previously settled portions of Virginia. Hercules Bridges, Henry Brooks and Nathaniel Pope were the early patentees of the Mattox Neck area (of three creeks, Mattox, Bridges, Popes) destined to become part of Westmoreland County.

The Henry Brooks patent of 1657 (reissued in 1662), included 1,020 acres (4.1 km^{2}) bounded: "on the northwest side to a marked corner hickory with a creeke [unnamed Bridges] that divideth this land and the land now in possession of Daniel Lisson on the northeast side with potomack river on the southeast side with the Creeke [unnamed Popes] dividing this land from the land of Colo. Nathaniel Pope to a marked red oake on the southwest thence with a line of marked trees running west and northwest 60 poles northwest half a point more westerly 310 poles and west northwest somewhat more westerly 140 poles to the aforementioned hiccory and place."

Col. William Underwood had died by 11 Mar 1662/3 when Margaret & Mary Williamson, daughters of James & Ann [Underwood] Williamson, patented 882 A in Old Rappahannock Co VA "between some of the head branches of Pepetick Cr. & head branches of Mr. POPES Cr., beg. nigh Rappa path &c. to the head of land of Silvester Thatcher & Thomas Whitlock, thence NW &c. upon land of Tho. Wright &c. Granted to William Underwood, Gent., 10 Sep 1658 & given to the above named by the last will of said Underwood."

Henry Brooks toward the end of life (1662) subdivided the patent into smaller tracts. One to Nicholas Saxton mentions the Abbingtons, a key family holding later added to the expanding Washington land: a deed of June 1660 for 40 acres (160,000 m^{2}) "Southeast with Popes Creeke beginning at a marked read oak standing on the said creeke side extending by a line of marked trees that parts the forty Acres from the land of David Whitley northwest seventy two poles unto a marked white oak thence southwest 88 poles unto a [unnamed Dancing] swamp that parts the said land from the land of Laurence Abington thence southwest down the said swamp unto the aforementioned Creeke to the place where it began." This area later became known as Duck Hall.

=== The Pope family ===
Nathaniel Pope is first mentioned as one of the twenty-four freeman of the "Grand Inquest" in Maryland in 1637 and in the Assembly afterward. He affixed a mark to his writings, and so was probably illiterate. In 1643 Pope and his nine menial servants were exempted from military service. Governor Leonard Calvert sent Pope as his agent to Kent Island in 1647, where he attempted, to persuade the rebels against the Proprietary there to come and live at Mattox Neck until they should become strong enough to seize the land again. After removing from Maryland, Nathaniel Pope, in 1651, patented 1,050 acres (4.2 km^{2}) in Old Northumberland between two large creeks; one would bear his name. At Mattox Creek he built dwellings, warehouses, and docks for the merchant trade with England including the port of Bristol. He shipped beaver, tobacco with caske, and raw materials; and he imported English manufactured goods. He settled the argument between John Washington and shipping partner Edward Prescott by paying off the senior officer in Beaver skins at eight shillings per pound. In 1655 Pope was made Lieutenant-Colonel in the militia. His wife was named Luce and they had: 1, Anne, who married John Washington; 2, Margaret, who married William Hardwich; 3, Thomas; 4, Nathaniel. The elder Nathaniel was among the county's wealthiest residents at his death in 1660, when he left The Clifts tract to his son Thomas. The Pope and Washington families were bound by more than blood—county documents are filled with their business and legal ties. The will of John Washington bequeaths 1000 pounds sterling to his brother-in-law Thomas Pope.

Thomas Pope, a "planter of Westmoreland" and "merchant of Bristol," died in Bristol, leaving a wife, Joanna, and sons, Thomas, Richard, Charles, John, and Nathaniel. Later, Westmoreland Justice of the Peace Lawrence Washington "refused to give his Judgment" on this estate (Will dated September 3, 1684) because he and his father John were trustees of "said Estate." On February 28, 1710, Joanna Pope, of Bristol, authorized Thomas Wills, merchant, and Nathaniel Pope, mariner, to dispose of the plantation known as "the Clifts". The letter of attorney describes her son as "Nathanial Pope of Pope's Creek." This Nathaniel, appeared in the county's records for the first time in 1704 when he married the daughter of a Westmoreland Justice of the Peace, William Peirce (pronounced purse). In 1716, Joanna and son Richard Pope sold the Clifts, including what was referred to in the deed as "the manner house erected on the second"; to Thomas Lee. Even as the Popes and Washingtons had circulated among the members of Westmoreland County's political gentry, Lee's family had made their name known throughout the colony of Virginia for two generations. In the year 1729, Lee lived at his father's plantation on Lower Machodoc Creek, when the dwelling burned down. After that he erected the brick mansion, now known as Stratford Hall, on the Clifts tract about a quarter mile from the original site. Thomas Lee became a member of the Governor's Council and served as acting governor of the colony in 1749 when William Gooch returned to England.

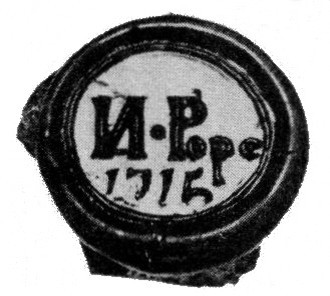
Wine bottle seal, Popes Creek artifact (1715)

Mary (Lisson) Pope, daughter of Thomas Lisson, gave a calf to her son Nathaniel Pope, alias Bridges, in 1675 (Mary (Lisson) Pope married, in order after her husband Nathaniel Pope died, William Bridges, Lewis Nicholas, and finally David Wyckliffe. Her son Nathaniel Pope would be known thereafter as Nathaniel Pope alias Bridges). As Mary Nicholas, widow of Lewis Nicholas, she made presents in 1677 to her son Nathaniel Pope, alias Bridges, and to her son Lewis Nicholas. She married again, David Wyckliffe (son of David Wyckliffe and who was the first white Protestant child born in Maryland), who promised to keep her children "so farre at school as to write and reade". Mary Nicholas refers to her brother and sister, Captain Daniel Lisson (Liston) and Jane, his wife. The will of John Rosier (will, September–October, 1705) leaves land to Nathaniel Pope, clerk of Stafford and practitioner at law; and the rest of the estate is given to his wife, Mary Rosier, who was Mary Pope, alias Bridges.

Two Nathaniel Popes lived in the same area around the year 1700, both grandsons of the original patentee. Nathaniel alias Bridges (through the early death of Nathaniel II) became an established Westmoreland attorney by 1705, and served as guardian of Nathaniel Washington in 1708. The mariner Nathaniel was first recorded as married in 1704. Furthermore, Nathaniel alias Bridges' son John married his cousin Elizabeth (Peirce) Pope, daughter of the mariner/merchant Nathaniel, making the identification by alias significant. A Pope family artifact unearthed at George Washington's birthplace, a wine bottle seal marked "N. Pope 1715," probably belonged to Nathaniel alias Bridges. Jane Brooks (Higdon) Brown was the sister of Lydia Abbington. Her daughter Jane married Nathaniel Pope alias Bridges about 1690. The son of Nathaniel and Jane (Brown) Pope is listed as John Pope, "Planter" in 1728 when Augustine Washington purchased his mill "for 60 Pounds current Virginia money two acres with the appurtenances together with the mill thereon erected & built scituate [several miles upstream] at the head of Popes Creek." Augustine added to the property the road called "Lord's rolling road" (the name alludes to rolling hogsheads of tobacco down to the Potomac). The mill remained in the Washington family until after the Civil War.

=== The Washington family ===
At least two progenitors of future Presidents of the United States, John Washington and Andrew Monroe, lived in this area during the 17th century. Both became involved in a legal dispute in 1664 between Richard Cole and David Anderson in which "Major Washington [now a member of the Westmoreland Court] did not sitt or vote in this order." "A Jury of the neighbourhood" or "any twelve" of the fifteen listed was seated.

- Maj. John Lord
- Thomas Butler
- William Freake
- Andrew Monroe
- Richard Griffin
- John Brookes
- Richard Hill
- Elias Webb
- Daniel Lisson (Liston)
- Christopher Butler
- Abraham Feild
- John Frissell
- William Cradouck
- John Browne
- John Lancelott

Unfortunately for researchers, there were two Richard Coles at the same time in what is now Westmoreland County. One was originally from Maryland and migrated to Virginia in the 1650s. He settled on the Washington's Birthplace land on the Potomac between Pope's and Bridges’ creeks and died in 1664. Numerous Maryland documents mentioning him contain references to other landowners in the Pope's Creek area. He was never known as a merchant, as was the Richard Cole of Cole's Point who died in 1674. Equally confusing was the existence both in Northumberland County and Maryland of others named Cole. It was the Cole who died in 1674 who owned the land that later passed to the Carters. Washington may have had vested interests in the property and purchased the court ordered Anderson settlement acreage a few months later.

The aforementioned will of John Washington who died in 1677 gave four thousand weight of tobacco to the rector of the church with orders that a tablet of the Ten Commandments be set up as his memorial stone. John had followed his father's religious upbringing and was elected to the parish vestry in 1661. In May 1664 the name of the parish was changed from Appomattox to Washington in his honor, being bounded from "upper Marchoticke downward to ye foote of ye westernmost side of Mr. Popes Cliffes."

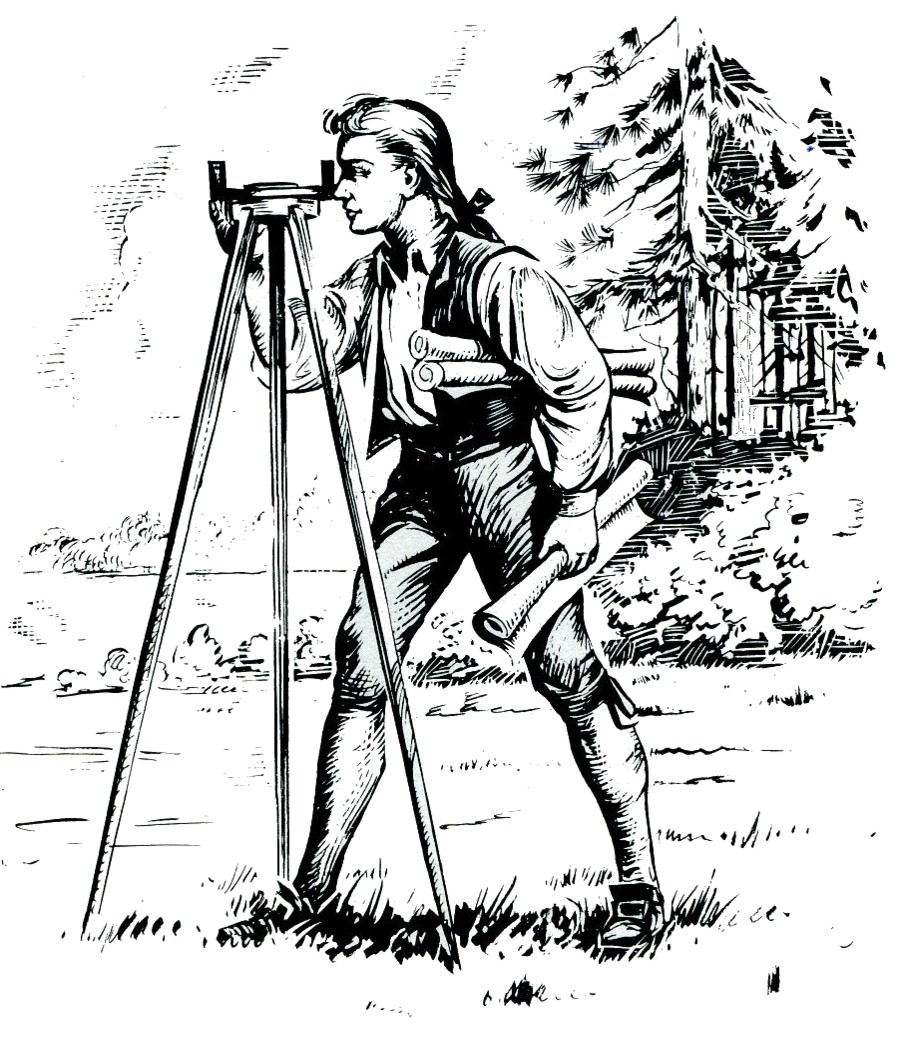
Ink sketch of young George Washington surveying the area at the Popes Creek Plantation. (National Park Service)

Augustine Washington moved from his Bridges Creek inheritance to Popes Creek in 1718 according to the February 18 deed of lease that described his new property as: "all that one hundred & fifty acres of land situate in the said County of Westmoreland aforesd and bounded viz. Beginning at a marked hickory on the head of the dancing marsh and so running down the said line to Popes Creek thence up the said Creek to the line of Nathaniel Washington and then up that line to include the aforesd One hundred & fifty acres of land which was given [by Henry Brookes] to Lawrence Abbington & his daughter Lydia together."

George Washington only lived at Popes Creek to age 3, but returned in his teenage years to stay with his half-brother Austin after the death of their father and made an early survey drawing of the area when only 15 years old. The first stake inland of the Berry survey in 1742 to clarify land lines on Popes Creek was reportedly in the adjacent cornfield of John Muse. On the opposite side of the creek at the point directly across from Longwood Swamp is the area now called Muses Beach. On May 24, 1768, George Washington wrote in his notes: "Came up to Popes Creek and staid there all day" and the next day went to "Brother Sam's" for dinner. On May 26, 1771, he "proceeded to Mrs. Washington's of Popes Creek in the afternoon." On the 27th he "stayd there all day," visiting with Austin's widow and family. The first use of the name, Wakefield, for the family mansion is recorded in 1773 in a letter from Richard Henry Lee to his brother William in December stating, "Mrs. Washington of Wakefield" was dead. An advertisement in the Virginia Gazette of June 2, 1774 read: "To be SOLD at the plantation of the late Mrs. Anne Aylett Washington, of Popes creek on Wednesday the 6th of June next. The personal estate thereunto belonging, consisting of considerable stocks of horses, cattle, hogs, and sheep; likewise all the household and kitchen furniture. Twelve months credit will be allowed, on giving bond, with approved security, to Burdit Ashton, executor. At the same time and place will be sold, a very good CHARIOT, with a new set of harness for four horses, belonging to the said estate."

According to family tradition, Mrs. Washington's son, "Colo. W. Aug W. ...was living at the birthplace in 1779 that on Christmas Day he had a company of neighbors and he with others returning from a ride at midday was first to discover the roof in a blaze, that the contents of the house were for the most part saved, a severe frost prevailing at the time enabled him to haul the furniture with oxen across Popes Creek on the ice to be sheltered in a house on Smiths Hill then owned by Daniel Macarty; and that the supposition as to the origin of the fire was that a spark from the chimney had blown through the garret window to a pile of cotton in the seed drying in the garret." Wakefield was never rebuilt and in William Augustine's will of July 12, 1810, the property was described as "the Burnt house plantation and the Islands and Marsh in the Creek belonging to me."

=== Other families ===
- Indentured persons

The Virginia Gazette for June 9, 1738, carried an advertisement that read: "Ran away from Capt. McCarty's Plantation, on Popes Creek, in Westmoreland County, a servant man belonging to me [Augustine Washington], the Subscriber, in Prince William County; his Christian name is John, but Sir-name forgot, is pretty tall, a Bricklayer by Trade, and is a Kentishman; he came into Potomack, in the Forward, Capt. Major, last year… whoever will secure the said Bricklayer, so that he may be had again, shall have Five Pounds Reward, besides what the Law allows paid by Augustine Washington."

- Bowdens of Popes Creek

According to Afro-American genealogist Anita Wills, Mary and Patty, mother and daughter, were a family of Mulattoes who served 30 year indentures under the laws of Colonial Virginia. The laws were aimed at the mixed-race children of white women. Mary or Mol was connected to the Monroe and Chilton families and may have been forced into court and indenture in 1737 at age seven by Augustine Washington Sr. The Washington Plantation also housed about seventy-five slaves. Like slavery, Mary and Patty's indentures as Free Persons of Color were forced, different from the voluntary indentures served by Europeans. Mary ran away several times after the birth of Patty circa 1750 and was retrieved by Augustine Jr. according to the 1758 court records: "Mary Bowden a Molatto Servant was brought to face the Court & Ordered to Serve her Master Augustine Washington Gent. his heirs and assigns four Years Six Months & The? days for two years Runaway time & two fees? to be Expended in taking of her up after her Indented time is expired."

Friends of Popes Creek Plantation

- Spencers of Cople Parish, Westmoreland

Col. Nicholas Spencer, member of the House of Burgesses, Secretary and President of the Council and later acting Governor (1683–1684) of the Virginia colony, was the first settler of the name in Westmoreland County. Spencer was an agent for his cousins, the Lords Culpepper, owners of extensive grants in the colony. Westmoreland's Cople Parish, the Anglican parish which embraced half the county, was named in honor of Spencer and his birthplace, Cople, Bedfordshire, England. Spencer purchased the land that is now Mount Vernon with his friend Lt. Col. John Washington of Westmoreland. In his will of April 1688, Spencer styles himself "of Nominy in Westmoreland Co. in Virginia." The property eventually came into the possession of Robert Carter III, who over time manumitted many of the slaves thereon, despite the fervent opposition of slave-holding neighbors.

Wills of Westmoreland County

- Lawrence Pope was the son of Humphrey Pope who was a transported immigrant from England engaged by Major John Washington and Thomas Pope who received 1,200 acres (4.9 km^{2}) on 5 September 1661, for transplanting 24 such persons, 50 acres (200,000 m^{2}) per Headright.

Pope, Lawrence, 23 March 1723; 10 May 1723, Washington Parish. Land I live on to sons Humphrey, Thomas, and John; Thomas land in Cople Parish; John land at Popes Creek; dau. Elizabeth 1 negro and furniture; dau. Ann 1 negro and furniture; dau. Mary 1 negro and furniture; dau Jemima Spence 1 negro woman; dau. Penelope 1 negro etc. dau. Catherine 1 negro; James son of Benj. Waddey; godson John son of Nicholas Minor 1 mare; wife Jemima; bro. Humphrey Pope and bro. Nicholas Minor 33 shillings gold for rings; wife and son Humphrey exrs; to children horses, cattle, household goods.

- Steel, John, 16 March 1735; 28 July 1736.

Son John; Sarah Steel; sons Richard and Thomas; daus. Margaret, Mary, Elizabeth; son Charles; wife Margaret. Land on Popes Creek.

- Robert Vaulx's father, also Robert, had a large holding of 6,000 acres (24 km^{2}), often called Vaulxland.

Vaulx, Robert Capt., 39 Nov. 1721; 5 Dec. 1721. Land to sons Robert and James; my wife and three children (third child unnamed) residue of estate; land at head of Popes Creek; my wife, Augustine Washington and Richard Kenner exrs.

- Field, Daniel, 17 April 1720; * * July 1720.

2 plantations and 1 negro to dau. Joyce Hudson; Emma Price; sons Abraham and Henry my still and worm; son Henry 50 acres (200,000 m^{2}) of land and the land in the fork of Rappahannock River to Abraham and Henry; son John Wheeler exr; Evan Price land in Stafford county; son Daniel Field land on Popes Creek.

- Worden, John, Physician, 17 Jan. 1714; 31 October 1716.

½ estate to Godson Worden Pope; friend Nathaniel Pope and Joseph Weeks other half of estate; Jane wife of Nathaniel Pope.

- Hemmings, Joseph, (Nuncupative) 25 June 1718; 10 July 1718.

To godson John Jones a suit of clothes and a hat; Mrs. Jane Pope a reading glass; wife Elizabeth residue of estate.

== Postscript ==
Burial Ground: Jane Butler Washington; b. 24 October 1699, d. 24 September 1729.
Here lyes ye Body of JANE
Wife of Augustine Washington
Born at Popes Creek Virginia
Westmorelnd ye 24th Xber
1699 & died ye 24th of 9ber 1729
Who left behind her two sons & one daughter.

The land comprising the Popes Creek plantation was sold by the Washington family on October 13, 1813, but returned in a sense in 1867 when John E. Wilson who married Betty, the granddaughter of William Augustine, took possession. Dr. F.O. St. Clair's investigations and survey of a proposed memorial site in 1882 was an effort to secure the "entire neck of land bounded by Pope's Creek on two sides and a marsh on the third side" – 11 acres (45,000 m^{2}) and a 100-foot (30 m) right-of-way "to Bridge Creek Landing," including the "Burying Ground and Potomac River beyond." The result was 21 acres (85,000 m^{2}) purchased from John E. Wilson on July 10, 1883, by the federal government. The sustained effort for a national monument on Popes Creek had begun to take shape.

VA-3 J69A Historic marker (text)
Popes Creek

Episcopal Church

On this site, a part of
"Longwood," stood Popes Creek
Episcopal Church, built about
1744 on land given by the
McCarty family. The Lees and
Washingtons worshipped here.
About 1826 it fell into disuse
and was burned as being unsafe.

VA State Library [sponsor] 1959

== See also ==
- List of Virginia rivers
