= George C. Washington =

American politician

George Corbin Washington
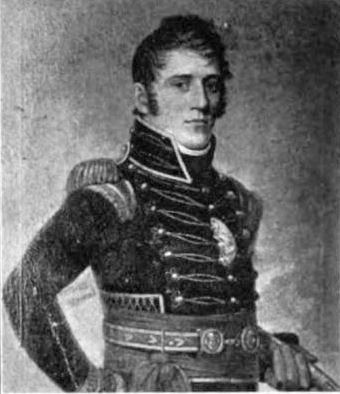

Member of the U.S. House of Representatives from Maryland's 5th district
- In office March 4, 1835 – March 3, 1837
- Preceded by: Isaac McKim
- Succeeded by: William Cost Johnson

Member of the U.S. House of Representatives from Maryland's 3rd district
- In office March 4, 1827 – March 3, 1833
- Preceded by: George Peter
- Succeeded by: James Turner

Member of the Maryland House of Delegates
- In office 1816–1819

Personal details
- Born: July 20, 1789 Westmoreland County, Virginia, U.S.
- Died: July 17, 1854 (aged 64) Washington, D.C., U.S.
- Resting place: Oak Hill Cemetery; Washington, D.C., U.S.
- Party: Adams (1827–1829); Anti-Jackson (1829–1837); Native American Party (1852)
- Education: Phillips Academy; Harvard University

George Corbin Washington (August 20, 1789 – July 17, 1854) was a United States representative from the third and fifth districts of Maryland, serving four terms from 1827 to 1833, and 1835 to 1837.

== Early life and education ==
Washington was born at Haywood Farms near Oak Grove in Westmoreland County, Virginia, the son of William Augustine Washington and his first wife Jane Washington. He attended Phillips Academy and Harvard University, studied law, but devoted himself to agricultural pursuits on his plantation in Maryland.

He was a grandnephew of U.S. President George Washington, as the grandson of George's half-brother Augustine Jr. (on his father's side) and of George's brother John (on his mother's side).

== Career ==
He resided for the most part at Dumbarton Heights in the Georgetown neighborhood in Washington, D.C., and served in the Maryland House of Delegates 1816–1819. Washington was elected to the Twentieth, Twenty-first, and Twenty-second Congresses, serving three terms from March 4, 1827, until March 3, 1833. In Congress, he served as chairman of the Committee on District of Columbia during the Twenty-second Congress. He was not a candidate for renomination in 1832, but was elected two years later as an Anti-Jacksonian to the Twenty-fourth Congress, serving one term from March 4, 1835, to March 3, 1837, and following that he was not a candidate for renomination.

After his service in Congress, Washington became president of the Chesapeake and Ohio Canal Company. He was also appointed by President John Tyler in 1844 as a commissioner to adjust and settle the claims arising under the treaty of 1835 with the Treaty faction of the Cherokee Nation.

In 1852, he was nominated by the Know Nothings as a candidate for vice president on a ticket with Daniel Webster. Upon Webster's death nine days before the election, the ticket was replaced by Jacob Broom and Reynell Coates.

== Death ==
He died on July 17, 1854, in the Georgetown neighborhood of Washington, D.C., and is interred in Oak Hill Cemetery.

U.S. House of Representatives
Preceded by George Peter	U.S. Congressman from the 3rd district of Maryland; 1827–1833	Succeeded by James Turner
Preceded by Isaac McKim	U.S. Congressman from the 5th district of Maryland; 1835–1837	Succeeded by William Cost Johnson
