= Charles Washington =

American planter & politician (1738–1799)

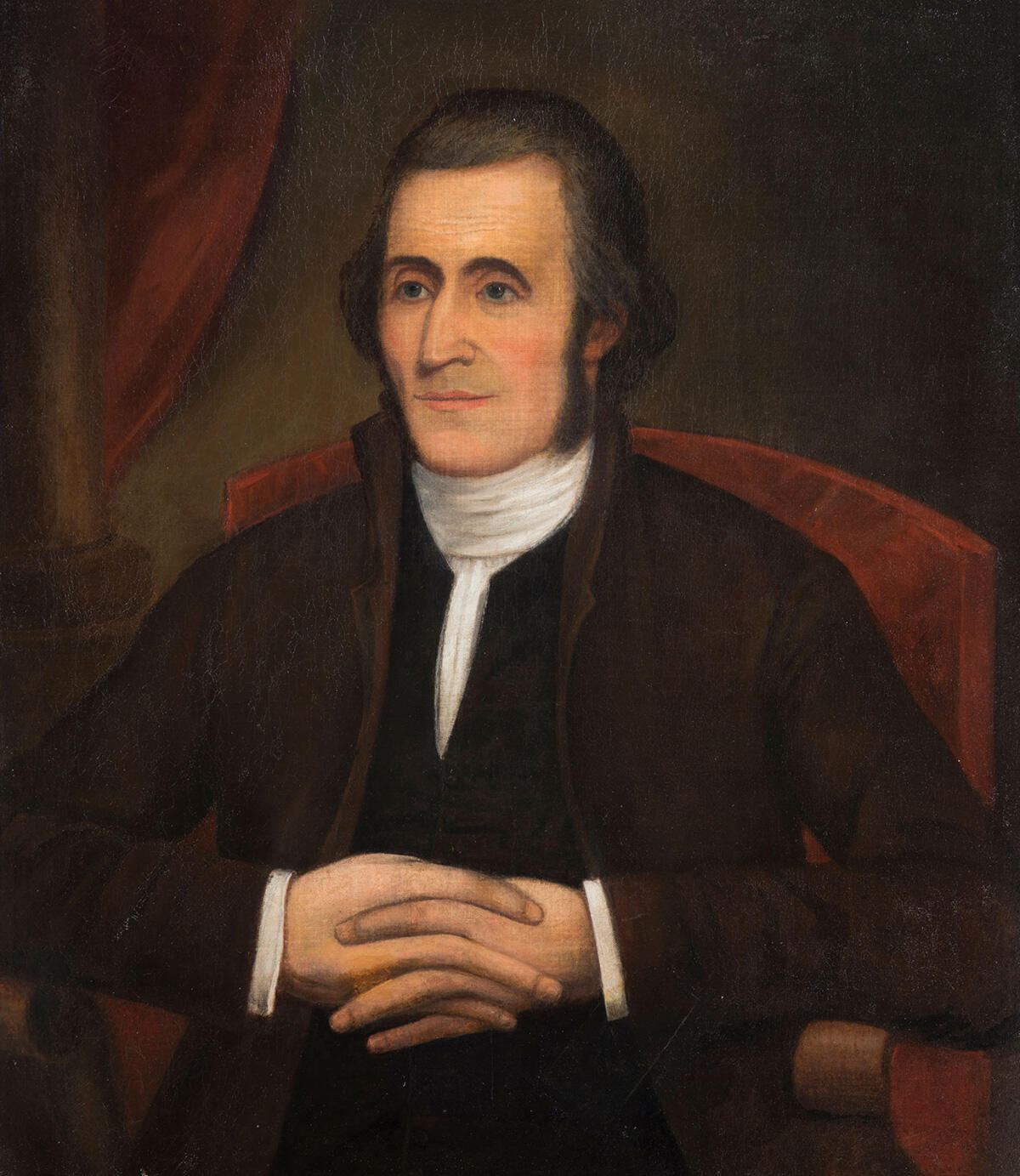
- Portrait by James Alexander Simpson, 1855
- Born: May 2, 1738; Hunting Creek, Virginia
- Died: September 16, 1799 (aged 61)
- Spouse: Mildred Thornton
- Children: 4
- Parent(s): Augustine Washington; Mary Ball Washington
- Family: Washington family

Charles Washington (May 2, 1738 – September 16, 1799) was an American planter and politician who was the younger brother of George Washington, and the founder and namesake of what is now Charles Town, West Virginia.

== Early and family life ==
Charles was born near Hunting Creek in Stafford County, Virginia (now Fairfax County) to Augustine Washington (1693–1743) and his second wife, Mary Ball Washington (1708–1789), an orphan and heiress of Col. Joseph Ball of Lancaster County, Virginia. His father died when he was five years old. His eldest half-brother Lawrence Washington (1718–1752) returned from England (where he was being educated), took charge of most of his father's property as well as his underage half-siblings (including Charles, who would receive a private education locally, as was becoming the custom for children of his class), and also became the colony's Adjutant-General and one of Fairfax County's (part-time) representatives in the House of Burgesses.

In 1757, having reached legal age, Charles married Mildred Thornton, daughter of Colonel Francis Thornton and Frances Gregory. They had four children:

- George Augustine Washington
- Frances Washington
- Samuel Washington
- Mildred Gregory Washington

== Career ==
When Charles Washington reached legal age, he inherited 750 acres of land in Spotsylvania County, Virginia, per his late father's will. In 1761 he purchased two lots in the town of Fredericksburg, the Spotsylvania County seat, and built a house, which exists today but is known as the historic "Rising Sun Tavern." In 1773 he bought an additional 200 acres in Spotsylvania County. Though his parents' youngest son, Charles also inherited considerable property in what was then vast Frederick County, Virginia, because his eldest half-brother, Lawrence Washington, died without any surviving children (and his widow died in 1761). Charles operated such of his property already developed into farms using enslaved labor, and would in 1780 move to the Shenandoah Valley and develop much of that property to farms also using enslaved labor.

Initially, Charles Washington lived in Fredericksburg, Virginia. He became a vestryman of the local Episcopal Church He arrived in present Jefferson County, West Virginia, between April and October 1780 and founded Charles Town. There he erected a house, Happy Retreat, the same year. In 1786, on 80 acres (32 ha) of his adjoining land, Charles laid out the streets of Charles Town, naming many of them after his brothers and one after his wife, Mildred. He donated the four corner lots at the intersection of George and Washington Streets for public buildings of the town and county, provided the town become the seat of the county upon its separation from Berkeley County. Jefferson County was formed in 1801 as Charles anticipated. The county court house stands on one of these lots.

== Death and legacy ==
Charles died sometime between July and September 1799, a span of between 3-5 months before the death of his brother George, who died on December 14th of that same year. Although his son George Augustine Washington had predeceased his father (although leaving behind George Fayette Washington, Charles Augustine Washington and Maria Washington), his other son Samuel Washington was one of the named executors of the President. He also was survived by his widow (who died in 1804) and their daughters Frances Washington Ball (wife of Burgess Ball) and Mildred Hammond (wife of Thomas Hammond). The grave sites of Charles and Mildred are near Evitts Run and have recently been located and surrounded by a stone wall.

== Ancestry ==
Ancestors of Charles Washington

16. Lawrence Washington
8. John Washington
17. Amphyllis Twigden
4. Lawrence Washington
18. Nathaniel Pope
9. Anne Pope
19. Lucy (Luce) Fox
2. Augustine Washington
20. Augustine Warner
10. Augustine Warner Jr.
21. Mary Towneley
5. Mildred Warner
22. George Reade
11. Mildred Read
23. Elizabeth Martian (Martiau)
1. Charles Washington
24. William Ball
12. William Ball
25. Dorothy Tuttle
6. Joseph Ball
26. Thomas Atherold
13. Hannah Atherold
27. Mary Harvey
3. Mary Ball
28. Peter Montague
14. Peter Montague
29. Cicely Matthews
7. Mary Montague
30. Meindert Doodes
15. Mary Doodes
31.Mary Garrett (or Geret)
