= Blenheim (Wakefield Corner, Virginia) =

Historic house in Virginia, United States

- U.S. National Register of Historic Places
- Virginia Landmarks Register
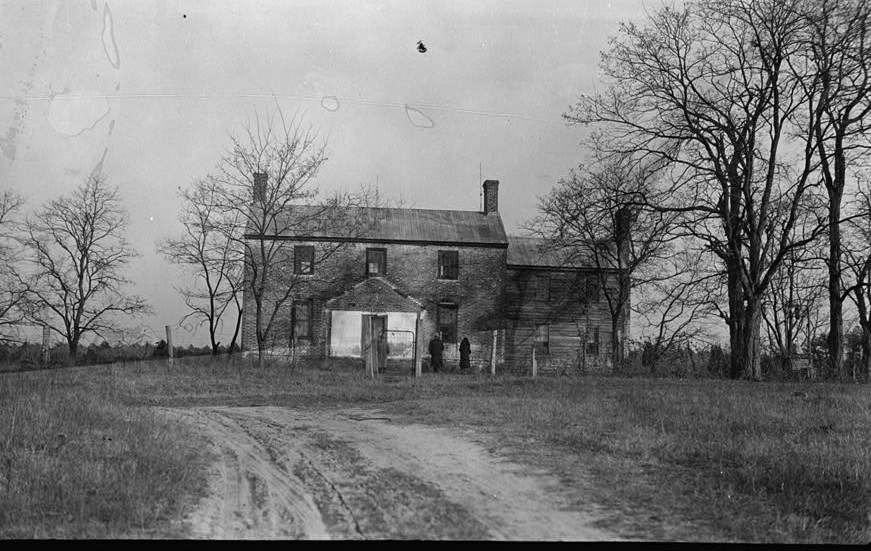
- Blenheim, HABS Photo

- Location within Virginia Location within the United States
- Location: N of Wakefield Corner off VA 204, near Wakefield Corner, Virginia
- Coordinates: 38°11′11″N 76°56′38″W
- Area: 425 acres (172 ha)
- Built: c. 1781
- Architectural style: Georgian, Late Georgian
- NRHP reference No.: 75002042
- VLR No.: 096-0003

Significant dates
- Added to NRHP: June 5, 1975
- Designated VLR: February 18, 1975

Blenheim is a historic home located near Wakefield Corner, Westmoreland County, Virginia. It was built about 1781, and is a two-story, three-bay, Late Georgian style brick dwelling. It has a gable roof and two-story, frame wing. The house was built by the Washington family to replace the original family house at Wakefield soon after it burned on Christmas Day, 1779. The house was built for William Augustine Washington, the son of George Washington's half-brother Augustine Washington II.

It was listed on the National Register of Historic Places in 1975.
