= Warner Hall =

Historic house in Virginia, United States

- U.S. National Register of Historic Places
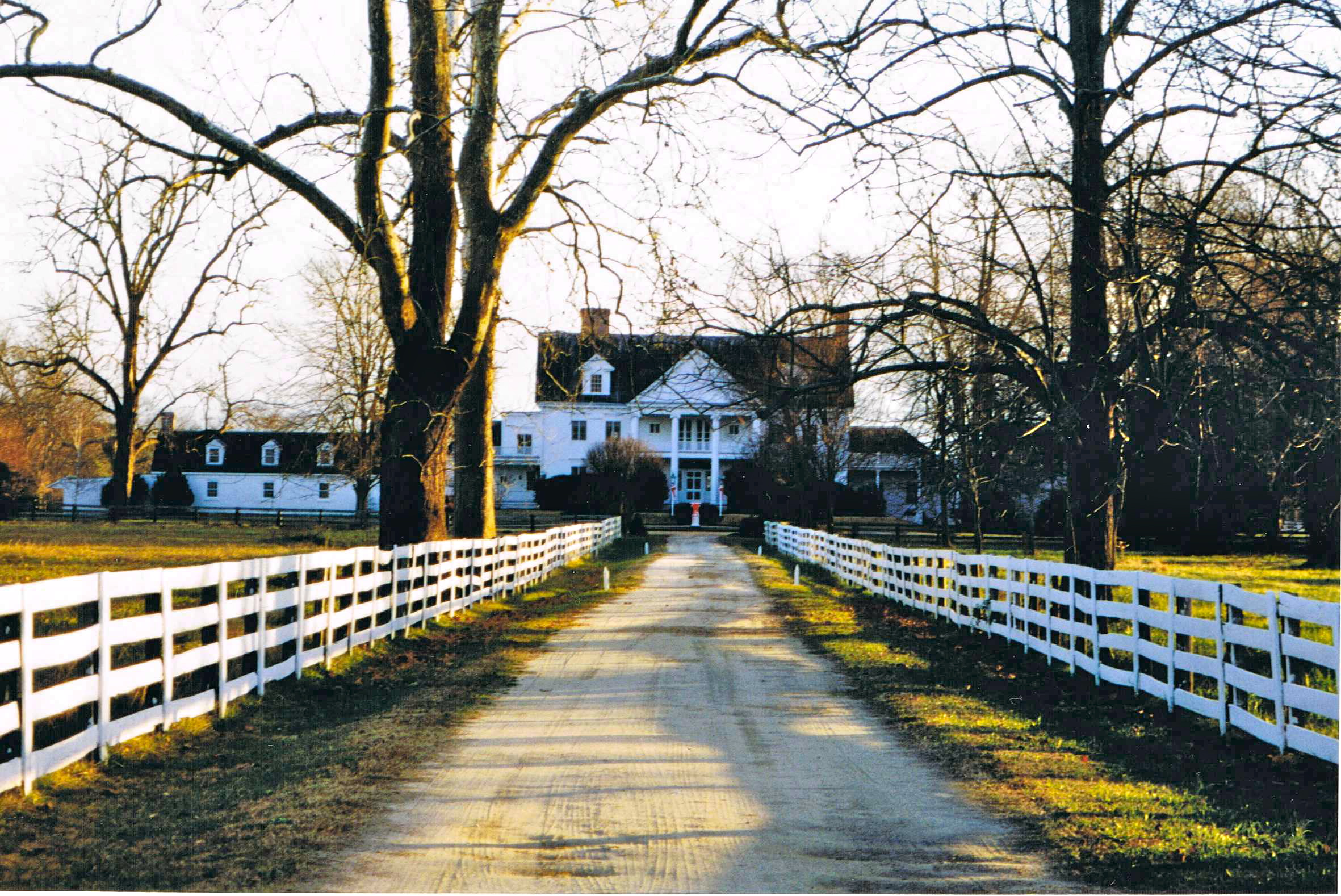

- Location within Virginia Location within the United States
- Location: VA 629, Gloucester, Virginia
- Coordinates: 37°20′24″N 76°28′36″W
- Built: 1740
- Architectural style: Colonial Revival, Colonial, Greek Revival
- NRHP reference No.: 80004191
- Added to NRHP: November 25, 1980

Warner Hall is a historic plantation in Gloucester County, Virginia, United States. Augustine Warner, progenitor of many prominent First Families of Virginia, and great-great-grandfather of President George Washington established the plantation in 1642 after receiving a royal land grant, and would serve in the House of Burgesses, as would many later owners.

While Augustine Warner Jr. operated the plantation and served as speaker of the House of Burgesses, rebels associated with Bacon's Rebellion sacked and looted it, as well as made it their headquarters after they sacked Jamestown, Virginia. Warner sought compensation for goods valued at £845, or the equivalent of what 40 slaves or servants would produce in a year, which led to litigation with fellow burgess William Byrd I, whom Warner blamed for supporting Bacon but who portrayed himself as a fellow victim. Warner had no male heirs, although his daughter Mildred would become the grandmother of George Washington, and his daughter Elizabeth married John Lewis, who assumed the house and surrounding plantation, as well as served in the House of Burgesses, as did their descendants until circa 1820. Two men named Warner Lewis operated the plantation and sympathized with the patriot cause during the American Revolutionary War. Warner Lewis (1720-) was the eldest son of Col. John Lewis and his wife, the former Frances Fielding, and probably educated in England before becoming a partner in his father's shipping business and purchasing another 1300 acres in Abingdon parish from his cousin Lawrence Smith. Warner Lewis had been a justice of the peace for Gloucester County since 1743 and in 1746 married Eleaner Bowles Gooch, the daughter of Marylander James Bowles, granddaughter of British Admiral Addison, and widow of William Gooch Jr. (son of a Virginia colonial governor, but who had no children). They had eight children, including Warner Lewis Jr. (1747-Dec. 30, 1791) who was educated at Oxford University and in 1769 attempted to patent 45,00 acres of western lands on the Kanawha River near its confluence with the Ohio River. Although the elder Warner Lewis initially attempted not to take sides in the dispute with Britain, either he or his son of the same name chaired Gloucester's Committee of Safety on April 3, 1775 and on September 13 became colonel of the county militia as well as County Lieutenant, with Sir John Peyton then acting as colonel of the Gloucester regiment.

The house burned in 1840, and the two surviving (and used) outbuildings were joined circa 1900 to become a Colonial Revival mansion. It is currently operated as a country inn. The cemetery on the property, which includes graves of the Warner and Lewis families, has been maintained by the Association for Preservation of Virginia Antiquities since 1903.

The plantation was listed on the National Register of Historic Places in 1980.

== See also ==
- National Register of Historic Places listings in Gloucester County, Virginia
