= Rising Sun Tavern (Fredericksburg, Virginia) =

Historic commercial building in Virginia, United States

- U.S. National Register of Historic Places
- U.S. National Historic Landmark
- U.S. Historic district – Contributing property
- Virginia Landmarks Register
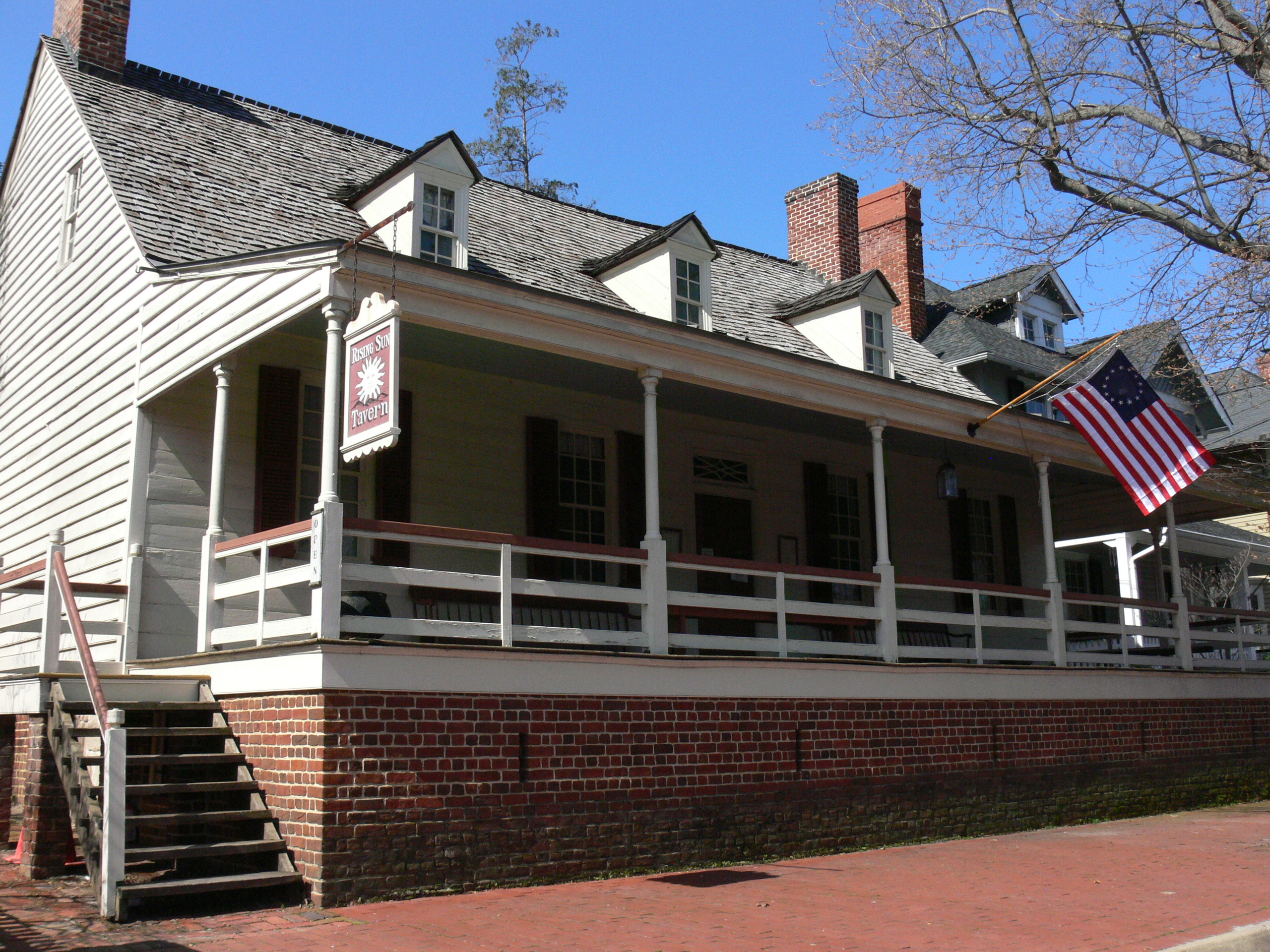
- Rising Sun Tavern

- Location within Northern Virginia Location within Virginia Location within the United States
- Location: 1304 Caroline Street, Fredericksburg, Virginia
- Coordinates: 38°18′24″N 77°27′42″W
- Built: 1760
- Part of: Fredericksburg Historic District (ID71001053)
- NRHP reference No.: 66000919
- VLR No.: 111-0088

Significant dates
- Added to NRHP: October 15, 1966
- Designated NHL: January 29, 1964
- Designated CP: September 22, 1971
- Designated VLR: September 9, 1969

The Rising Sun Tavern is a historic building in Fredericksburg, Virginia. It was built in about 1760 as a home by Charles Washington, youngest brother of George Washington, and became a tavern in 1792.

== History ==
This house, built by the youngest brother of George Washington, was occupied by the Washington family until about 1780. The property was sold to Larkin Smith in 1791 and in 1792 was bought by Colonel Gustav Wallace who rented the building to Mr. John Frasier, who operated a tavern there. Though the tavern became known as the "Rising Sun Tavern" in the 20th century, it was actually known as the "Golden Eagle" or the "Eagle" in the 1790s. The ordinary at the old Washington family home served travelers into the 1820s under various owners.

The Association for the Preservation of Virginia Antiquities, which is now called Preservation Virginia, purchased the building in 1907 and it was given to the Fredericksburg branch of that group to operate. In 1933, the Society of Cincinnati hosted a Sesquicentennial celebration on the property and presented Preservation Virginia with a bronze medal in appreciation of their preservation efforts. The building is filled with period furnishings and stories of early life in Fredericksburg. In mid-2012, Preservation Virginia signed an agreement passing ownership to the newly created "Washington Heritage Museums" group by 2013. The site continues to be open as a museum.

It was designated a National Historic Landmark in 1964 and added to the National Register of Historic Places in 1966.

Originally, the large front porch was not part of the structure. It was added during the tavern phase of the property. No longer serving food and drink, guides provide visitors with a lively interpretation of eighteenth-century tavern life. The site is open daily.
