= Wakefield Corner, Virginia =

Unincorporated community in Virginia, US

Coordinates: 38°10′19″N 76°56′57″W

Wakefield Corner is an unincorporated community in Westmoreland County, in the U.S. state of Virginia.

Blenheim was listed on the National Register of Historic Places in 1975.
