= Reginald Bainbrigg =

Reginald Bainbrigg, or Baynbridge (1545–1606), was an English schoolmaster and antiquary.

== Life ==
Bainbrigg was born, probably in Westmoreland, about 1556. He matriculated as a sizar of Peterhouse, Cambridge, 12 June 1573, and took his B.A. degree in 1576–7. In 1580 he was appointed headmaster of the Appleby Grammar School at Appleby-in-Westmorland, endowed by Queen Elizabeth in 1574, and combined his school work with antiquarian and archæological research. He zealously collected all stones bearing ancient inscriptions in the three counties of Northumberland, Cumberland, and Westmoreland, and in 1602 he built a small house in his garden for their preservation. An inscription cut in one of its walls stated that its owner had been teaching at Appleby for twenty-two years, and was fifty-seven years old. The house, with its contents, was standing till the close of the seventeenth century, but the collection appears, soon afterwards, to have been broken up, and no trace of it has since been found. Bainbrigg sent copies of the inscriptions he had brought together to William Camden, who printed them in his Britannia, and acknowledged his indebtedness to "the very learned Reginald Bainbrigg". Bainbrigg died in 1606. By his will dated 11 May in that year, he bequeathed his household furniture and a garden to succeeding headmasters of the grammar school, and the annual rental of a small burgage, amounting to 2s. 4d., to the head boy for the time being, provided he wrote a copy of Latin verses in praise of himself and two other benefactors of the school. Other lands, building material, and books he left for a new schoolhouse, about to be erected when he died.

== Works ==
Among the Cottonian MSS. at the British Library (Jul. F. vi.) are the following papers ascribed to Bainbrigg:

- Account of Antiquities in Northumberland, Cumberland, Westmoreland, and Durham, with several Roman inscriptions, drawings of altars, figures, and descriptions of the country (No. 162)
- Genealogica Gospatriciorum et Curwenorum (No. 163)
- De Baronibus de Kendala et familia de Bruis (No. 164)

An Inscription on the Picts wall sent by Reginald Bainbrigg to Mr. William Camden is among the Lansdowne MSS. (121, art. 20). Some Latin elegiacs on the death of Sir Philip Sidney, signed 'R. Bauningus,' in the Lacrimæ Cantabrigienses (1587), have been attributed to Bainbrigg.
