= Accokeek Furnace Archeological Site =

Archaeological site in Virginia, United States

- U.S. National Register of Historic Places
- Virginia Landmarks Register
- Nearest city: Stafford, Virginia
- Area: less than one acre
- Built: 1726
- NRHP reference No.: 84003598
- VLR No.: 089-0066

Significant dates
- Added to NRHP: May 15, 1984
- Designated VLR: March 20, 1984

Accokeek Furnace Archeological Site is a historic archaeological site located near Stafford, Stafford County, Virginia. The Principio Company of Cecil County, Maryland, constructed the Accokeek Iron Furnace about 1726 on land leased from Augustine Washington, father of George Washington. After his death in 1743, his son Lawrence Washington inherited his interest in the company and furnace. When he died in 1752, his share descended to his brother Augustine Washington Jr. Operations at this site ceased around 1753. A historical marker denoting this site is located on the grounds of Colonial Forge High School.

It was listed on the National Register of Historic Places in 1984.
