= Thomas Godwin (politician) =

16th Speaker of the Virginia House of Burgesses
- In office 1676
- In office June 1676 – June 1676
- Preceded by: Augustine Warner Jr.
- Succeeded by: Augustine Warner Jr.

Member of the Virginia House of Burgesses for Nansemond County, Virginia
- Preceded by: John Blake
- Succeeded by: position suspended

Member of the Virginia House of Burgesses for Upper Norfolk County, Virginia
- In office 1659 Serving with Edward Carter, Giles Webb
- Preceded by: Thomas Francis
- Succeeded by: Lemuel Mason

Member of the Virginia House of Burgesses for Nansemond County, Virginia
- In office 1654-1655 Serving with Thomas Dew, Samuel Stoughton
- Preceded by: Edward Major
- Succeeded by: Edward Stretter

Personal details
- Died: 1677/8 Virginia
- Children: Thomas, Edmund, Elizabeth

Military service
- Branch/service: Virginia militia
- Rank: Colonel

Thomas Godwin (also spelled Goodwyn, Godwyn) (died 1677/8) was a Virginia politician, planter and real estate speculator in Tidewater Virginia. He thrice served in the House of Burgesses representing the Nansemond River area (variously Nansemond County, and later Upper Norfolk County), and was its Speaker in the June 1676 session that preceded Bacon's Rebellion.

== Early years ==
Godwin's birth and early years are undocumented.

== Virginia landowner ==
He and Richard Axom jointly patented 1,500 acres of land in York County, Virginia in 1650 (based on paying passage for emigrants). Godwin patented 200 acres of land in Nansemond County in 1655. He also patented 179 acres in Nansemond's Chuckatuck parish in 1668 and may have owned other land there as well as in Virginia's Northern Neck as well as Southside Virginia. Godwin's Chuckatuck property was expressly included in Nansemond County when the Virginia General Assembly drew its boundary with Isle of Wight County in 1674, and his son of the same name would expand holdings in that parish in 1688. In 1670, Godwin and a Puritan named Richard Bennett sent a letter to England identifying themselves as living in the Nansemond River area.

== Political career ==
His political career began by April 1654, when Godwin became a justice of the peace for what was then called Lower Norfolk County (the justices jointly administering the county in that era). Nansemond River area voters elected Godwin as one of their representatives in the House of Burgesses that year, but he was not re-elected, then when the area was termed Upper Norfolk County he won election in 1659 but not re-election, and again was elected to represent Nansemond county in 1676, when fellow Burgesses also elected him as their speaker. When Godwin became Speaker in 1676, it was the first time a speaker had been elected from south of the James River since his co-burgess Thomas Dew in 1652. Since that assembly in March 1676 named Godwin, John Lear and Thomas Milner to impress men and supplies to fight Native Americans, one historian deduced he was not allied with either the Governor Berkeley/Green Spring faction, nor the Nathaniel Bacon faction that revolted. That Assembly, which met just before the outbreak of Bacon's Rebellion, had all its acts annulled by the Assembly that met the following year, although a number of them were reenacted by that same session.

== Death and legacy ==
Godwin's will was dated March 24, 1677 (old style) and admitted to probate in 1679, after the rebellion. He named three children as heirs. His son Thomas Godwin Jr., who married Martha, the daughter and heiress of Col. Joseph Bridger in 1686, held the rank of Major in its militia, was among three men disciplined in May 1699 for spreading false rumors concerning an election that year, and also thrice served in the House of Burgesses representing Nansemond County beginning in 1710.
