= Augustine Washington =

American planter and merchant (1694–1743)

Augustine Washington Sr.
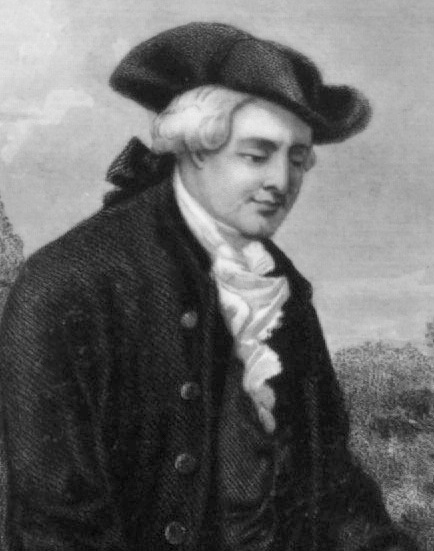
- 1867 depiction of Washington
- Born: 1694 (Note: Some sources assert a birthdate of November 12, 1694, however both Mount Vernon and the Encyclopedia of Virginia state the exact date is unknown, only the year is verifiable.); Westmoreland County, Virginia, English America
- Died: April 12, 1743 (aged 48–49); Stafford County, Virginia, British America
- Burial place: George Washington Birthplace National Monument
- Occupations: Planter, merchant
- Spouses: Jane Butler (m. 1715; died 1729) Mary Ball (m. 1731)
- Children: 10, including Lawrence, Augustine Jr., George, Elizabeth, Samuel, John, and Charles
- Parents: Lawrence Washington (father); Mildred Warner (mother)
- Family: Washington family

Augustine Washington Sr. (1694 – April 12, 1743) was an American planter and merchant. Born in Westmoreland County, Virginia, he was the father of 10 children, among them the first president of the United States, George Washington; soldier and politician Lawrence Washington; politician Augustine Washington Jr.; and politician Charles Washington. Born into the planter class of the British colony of Virginia, Washington owned several slave plantations, from which he derived the primary source of his wealth. He also speculated in land development and owned an iron mine. Although Washington never sat in the House of Burgesses, as did his own father and son, he served in various government positions in the counties where he owned land.

== Early and family life ==
Augustine Washington was born in 1694 in Westmoreland County, Virginia to Mildred Warner and her husband, Capt. Lawrence Washington, a militia captain and a member of the Virginia House of Burgesses. His paternal grandparents were Lt. Col. John Washington (c. 1631–1677) and his first wife, Anne Pope. His maternal grandparents owned Warner Hall and associated plantations in Gloucester County. Augustine was four years old when his father died. His mother remarried and moved the family to England, where she died when the children were still young; although their mother's will named their stepfather George Gale as their guardian, their cousin John Washington fought to have himself named the children's guardian and brought them back to Virginia.

When Washington came of age and into his inheritance in 1715, he married Jane Butler, another orphan, who had inherited about 640 acres (2.6 km^{2}) from her father, Caleb Butler. The young couple settled on the Bridges Creek property and had four children, only two of whom (Lawrence and Augustine Jr.) lived to adulthood. After Jane Butler's death in November 1728 or 1729, Washington married Mary Ball in 1731, and the couple had five children who survived to adulthood – George, Betty, Samuel, Charles, and John Augustine – and a daughter named Mildred who died in infancy.

== Career ==
When he reached legal age in 1715, Augustine Washington inherited about 1,000 acres (4.0 km^{2}) on Bridges Creek in Westmoreland County; his sister Mildred inherited what was called the Little Hunting Creek property; they both inherited enslaved people. In 1718, Washington purchased land on Pope's Creek, adjoining his property on Bridges Creek, and set about establishing himself. Between 1723 and 1735, he hired a local contractor to build a house, which was probably completed about 1726 despite the contractor's death (later called Wakefield). In the same year, Washington purchased the Little Hunting Creek property from his sister Mildred.

In 1725, Augustine Washington entered into an agreement with the Principio Company of England to start an iron works on Accokeek Creek in Stafford County, and he also owned a stake in their Maryland ironworks. In 1735, the family moved to the Little Hunting Creek property, which was closer to the Accokeek Furnace.

In 1738, Augustine Washington purchased the 150-acre Strother property across the Rappahannock River (now known as Ferry Farm) and moved the family there at the end of that same year.

Augustine Washington was active in the Anglican Church, the local militia, and politics. He took the oath as justice of the peace for the Westmoreland county court in July 1716, and served as county sheriff.

== Death and legacy ==
Washington died on April 12, 1743. After he died, his 11-year-old son George inherited the former Strother property and its slaves. Because George had not reached legal age, his widowed mother Mary Ball Washington managed this property for him until he came of age. She lived on the property until 1772 when she was 64 when George moved her to a house in Fredericksburg.

Lawrence Washington inherited the Little Hunting Creek property and renamed it "Mount Vernon" to honor Admiral Edward Vernon, with whom he had served in the Royal Navy in 1741 during the Battle of Cartagena de Indias during the War of Jenkins' Ear.

According to Augustine Sr's will, if his son Lawrence died without children, the Little Hunting Creek property would go to Augustine Jr., and Augustine Jr, in turn, would have to give up the Popes Creek property to his brother George. If Augustine Jr. did not want the Little Hunting Creek property, George would then inherit it. Upon Lawrence's death, Augustine Jr. chose Popes Creek and its slaves over the former Little Hunting Creek property. Lawrence's only surviving child, Sarah, lived until 1754; therefore, George Washington ultimately inherited the Little Hunting Creek property, which was known as Mount Vernon by that time. At his death, Augustine Washington Sr. enslaved a total of 64 people who were assigned among the various plantations.

Lawrence Washington's widow, Ann, had a life interest in the Little Hunting Creek plantation. Because she remarried and was not living at Mount Vernon, she leased the property to George in 1754. Upon her death in 1761, George Washington inherited the plantation outright.

=== Children (by Jane Butler) ===
- Butler Washington (1716–1716)
- Lawrence Washington (1718–1752)
- Augustine Washington Jr. (1720–1762)
- Jane Washington (1722–1735)

=== Children (by Mary Ball) ===
- George Washington (1732–1799), the first president of the United States
- Elizabeth Washington (1733–1797)
- Samuel Washington (1734–1781)
- John Augustine Washington (1736–1787)
- Charles Washington (1738–1799)
- Mildred Washington (1739–1740)

== See also ==
- Washington family
