= Peter Jenings =

Member of the Governor's Council for the Colony of Virginia
- In office 1670-1671

Member of the House of Burgesses for Gloucester County Colony of Virginia
- In office 1663-1670 Serving with Thomas Walker, Peter Knight, Francis Willis
- Preceded by: Peter Knight
- Succeeded by: Augustine Warner
- In office 1660 Serving with David Cant, Peter Knight, Francis Willis
- Preceded by: Augustine Warner
- Succeeded by: Peter Knight

Attorney General for the Virginia colony
- In office 1670–1671
- Preceded by: unknown
- Succeeded by: George Jordan

Personal details
- Born: circa 1630 Silsden, Yorkshire, England
- Died: 1671 Gloucester County Colony of Virginia
- Spouse: Catherine Lunsford
- Parent: William Jenings
- Relatives: Edmund Jenings
- Occupation: attorney, planter, politician

Peter Jenings (1630-1671) was an English attorney who emigrated to the Colony of Virginia, where he became a planter, served in both houses of the Virginia General Assembly and was the colony's attorney general. He twice represented Gloucester County in the House of Burgesses, as well as served on the Virginia Governor's Council probably for less than two years before his death.

== Early and family life ==
Born in Silsden in western Yorkshire, England, where his ancestors served as stewards for the Barons Clifford and Earl of Cumberland.

== Career ==
Jenings emigrated from England to the Virginia colony as a young man. Soon thereafter he acquired land in Gloucester County near Claybank Creek. In October 1660 Jenings patented 650 acres inland near the head of the Potomac River, based on people for whose immigration he had paid. In September 1663, Jenings and Mathew Kemp patented 2000 acres of land, half in Lancaster County north of Gloucester County.

In 1660, Gloucester County voters elected Jenings as one of the men representing them in the House of Burgesses, but he may not have stood for re-election, having accepted a position in April 1662 as the colony's deputy treasurer. However, Jenings did stand for election in 1663 and re-election in 1666 and won both times, during what was sometimes known as the Long Parliament because Governor Berkeley refused to call for colony-wide elections for more than a decade. Jenings became one of the commissioners who met with their Maryland counterparts to attempt to combat the low tobacco prices caused by British policy restricting sales to British brokers by pausing tobacco cultivation for a year or more. In 1670, upon Governor Berkeley's recommendation, Jenings was appointed to the upper house of the colonial legislature, known as the Governor's Council or Council of State, and was sworn in on June 20. Within a week, Governor Berkeley also nominated him as the colony's attorney general, and Jenings received his commission on September 15, 1670.

== Death and legacy ==
Jenings died in 1671, without any direct descendants, so a November 1688 deed in what had become Stafford County stated that his land has escheated to the state. By September 1674, his widow, Catherine, married Capt. Ralph Wormeley II, a major planter and member of the Council of State. By 1680, a distant cousin, Edmund Jenings, also an attorney, emigrated with a commission as the colony's attorney general, and like this man became a planter and politician.
