= Severn River (Virginia) =

River in United States

Coordinates: 37.32°N 76.40°W

Location
- Country: United States

Physical characteristics
- Source
  - location: Virginia

The Severn River is a 2-mile-long (3 km) tidal river in the United States state of Virginia. It is a tributary of Mobjack Bay, which is an arm of Chesapeake Bay.

== See also ==
- List of rivers of Virginia
