= Augustine Warner Sr. =

English planter and politician

Augustine Warner
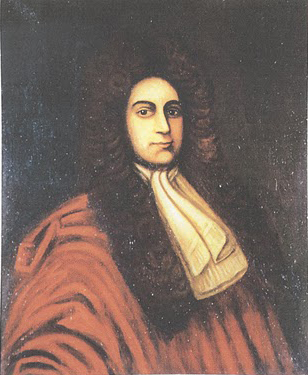
- Portrait of Augustine Warner Sr.

Member of the Virginia Governor's Council
- In office 1660–1671

Member of the House of Burgesses for Gloucester County
- In office spring 1659 – winter 1659 Serving with Francis Willis
- Preceded by: Anthony Elliott
- Succeeded by: Peter Jenings

Member of the House of Burgesses for York County
- In office spring 1652 – summer 1652 Serving with Francis Morgan, Henry Lee
- Preceded by: Ralph Wormeley Sr.
- Succeeded by: Christopher Calthropp

Personal details
- Born: September 28, 1611 Norwich, Norfolk, Kingdom of England
- Died: December 24, 1674 (aged 63) Gloucester County, Colony of Virginia, British America
- Spouse: Mary Townley
- Children: Augustine Warner Jr. and 2 daughters
- Parent(s): Thomas Warner; Elizabeth Sotherton
- Occupation: Planter, merchant, politician

Augustine Warner Sr. (September 28, 1611 – December 24, 1674) emigrated to the Virginia colony where he became a merchant, then major planter and politician. Warner served in both houses of the Virginia General Assembly, and became the progenitor of a prominent colonial family, with his son and heir Augustine Warner Jr. also serving as Speaker of the House of Burgesses. Augustine and Mary Townley Warner have the distinction of being the direct ancestors of Queen Elizabeth II, George Washington, Meriwether Lewis, Gen. Robert E. Lee, and Gen. George S. Patton.

== Early and family life ==
Born in Norwich, Norfolk, the son of Thomas Warner and wife Elizabeth Sotherton.

== Career ==
Emigrating aboard the Hopewell, Warner arrived in Virginia in 1628 at the age of seventeen, one of a group of thirty-four settlers brought in by Adam Thoroughgood, who served in both houses of the Virginia General Assembly, as would this man.

In 1635, Warner may have completed the terms of his indenture, and definitely made his first land acquisition, patenting 250 acres (1 million m^{2}) in New Poquoson in Elizabeth City County. Beginning in 1654, Warner used the land patents he acquired by paying for English people to emigrate to the booming Virginia colony to acquire land across the York River in Gloucester County (previously reserved for Native Americans, but released pursuant to a treaty negotiated by Governor William Berkeley during the Anglo-Powhatan Wars and formed from York County in 1651). One of those patents, for 594 acres on the north side of the Severn River along Mobjack Bay (near modern Yorktown, then in Charles River Parish) was made jointly with his neighbor and sometime burgess John Robins. Warner initially settled on the Pianketank Creek on land once held by Chiskiack people (members of the Powhatan Confederacy), but later moved to the new county's Severn River area. About 1657, Warner began building the first house at Warner Hall. He operated his plantations using a mixture of indentured (and later) enslaved labor.

Continuing an upper-class pattern of 17th-century success in colonial Virginia as a merchant, landowner, and politician, Warner rose through the class hierarchy. He received an appointment as justice of the peace for York County in 1652 (the justices jointly governing counties in that era). Warner also won his first elective office that year, serving as one of York County' representatives in the House of Burgesses, but neither he nor his fellow burgess that year won re-election. In 1659 Gloucester County voters elected Warner as one of their representatives in the House of Burgesses. The next year, Warner was appointed to the Virginia Governor's Council, a politically powerful post which he held for about a decade, until his death. In 1672, when the Virginia General Assembly decided to build a bridge across Dragon Run, Lt. Col. John Carter II and Robert Beckingham of Lancaster County met at Warner's home to finalize contracts.

== Personal life ==
Warner married Mary Townley (1614–1662) of Stone Edge in Lancashire. They had at least three children who survived their parents. Her father died in 1654/5 and her nephews (sons of her brother Lawrence Townley emigrated to the colony between 1658 and 1672, probably nearer 1660). Their son Augustine Jr. continued his father's career path as discussed below. One of Augustine Jr's sisters married burgess David Cant; and another sister, Sarah, married Lawrence Townley, whose daughter Alice married John Grymes and became an ancestor of General Robert E. Lee.

== Death and legacy ==
Augustine Warner died in Virginia on December 24, 1674, at sixty-three, and was succeeded at Warner Hall by his only son, Augustine Warner Jr. (1642–1681), who survived Bacon's Rebellion and continued the family's planter and political traditions. The younger Austin Warner had received an English education in London and at Cambridge University, and during this man's life by 1666 had emulated his father's political career path by winning election to the House of Burgesses. Austin Warner Jr. exceeded his father's accomplishments by becoming that body's Speaker in 1676, the year of Bacon's Rebellion, and after that insurrection was quashed (Warner Hall being damaged therein), he too won appointment to the Virginia Governor's Council. However, his member ship there was cut short by his early death in 1681 at the age of thirty-nine. Moreover, Austin Jr's three sons all died unmarried, although his daughters all married prominent landowners and politicians as discussed below.

=== Warner Hall ===
Warner Hall remains today as a historic house. On the National Register of Historic Places since 1980, it is now operated as an inn. It stayed in the eldest male line of the Lewis family, through a succession named Warner Lewis, until 1834, when it was sold by a daughter of the last, Elizabeth Lewis. The Lewis descendants became known as the "Warner Hall Lewises".

=== Descendants ===
Augustine Jr. had three sons, all of whom died unmarried, and three daughters, who inherited the Warner property and left many descendants:

- Mary, who, in 1680, married John Smith of Purton; they were ancestors of Queen Elizabeth II of the United Kingdom.
- Mildred, who, in about 1690, married Lawrence Washington (1659–1698); they were the paternal grandparents of George Washington; and
- Elizabeth, who, in about 1691, married John Lewis, and kept the Warner Hall house in the division of the Warner properties after the brothers' deaths. Elizabeth and John Lewis were the grandparents of Fielding Lewis, who married first George Washington's cousin, and second his sister, both ladies also being grandchildren of Mildred Warner. In addition, Elizabeth and John Lewis were the ancestors of Captain Meriwether Lewis of the Lewis and Clark Expedition.

== Bibliography ==
- Sorley, Merrow Egerton. Lewis of Warner Hall: The History of a Family, Including the Genealogy of Descendants in Both the Male and Female Lines, Biographical Sketches of Its Members, and Their Descent from Other Early Virginia Families
- Moses, Grace MacClean. The Welsh Lineage of John Lewis.
- The Queen's American Ancestors
