= Augustine Warner Jr. =

American planter and politician (1641–1681)

Member of the Virginia Governor's Council
- In office 1677–1681

15th Speaker of the Virginia House of Burgesses
- In office March 1676 – May 1676
- Preceded by: Robert Wynne
- Succeeded by: Thomas Godwin
- In office February 1677 – April 2, 1677
- Preceded by: Thomas Godwin
- Succeeded by: William Travers

Member of the House of Burgesses for Gloucester County
- In office 1672–1677
- Preceded by: Peter Jenings
- Succeeded by: John Armistead

Personal details
- Born: June 3, 1642 Colony of Virginia, British America
- Died: June 19, 1681 (aged 39) Colony of Virginia, British America
- Resting place: Warner Hall, Gloucester County, Virginia
- Spouse: Mildred Reade
- Children: Mildred; Mary; Elizabeth; Augustine
- Parent(s): Augustine Warner Sr. Mary Townley
- Relatives: Thomas Warner (grandfather)
- Occupation: Planter and politician

Military service
- Branch/service: Virginia militia
- Rank: Colonel
- Battles/wars: Bacon's Rebellion

Colonel Augustine Warner Jr. (June 3, 1642 – June 19, 1681) was a Virginian planter, military officer and politician. He served in the House of Burgesses from 1666 to 1677 and was its Speaker in two separate sessions in 1676 and 1677, before and after Bacon's Rebellion. Warner then served on the Virginia Governor's Council from October 1677 until his death. Warner is the last common ancestor of George Washington and King Charles III.

== Early life ==
Augustine Warner Jr. was born on June 3, 1642. He was the only son of Augustine Warner Sr., who in 1628 had settled in the Virginia Colony and by 1642 had established a plantation called "Austin's Desire" in Gloucester County, building Warner Hall on the property, and wife Mary Townley. The elder Warner served on the Council from 1659 until shortly before his death in 1674.

The younger Warner went to London in 1658 and attended the Merchant Taylors' School. He returned to Virginia after finishing his education and married Mildred Reade, daughter of George Reade, Secretary of the Virginia Colony.

== Planter and burgess ==
Warner settled on a farm in Gloucester County, living there until he inherited Warner Hall in 1674. He soon assumed his father's position as Colonel of the Gloucester county militia. Meanwhile, Warner began his political career as a burgess representing Gloucester County in 1672, during what had been called the "Long Assembly" in which elections were only held to replace deceased members, probably in this instance Warner's neighbor, planter and lawyer Peter Jenings.

== Bacon's Rebellion ==
In March 1676 the General Assembly called by Governor Sir William Berkeley in 1661 held its last session. Warner was elected Speaker, replacing Robert Wynne, who died the previous year. On May 10, as the Nathaniel Bacon crisis was building, Berkeley dissolved the House of Burgesses and called new elections. It is not known if Warner served in the new House that met in June.

Fighting began in late July. Warner remained loyal to Berkeley, joining his forces. Bacon's forces captured Jamestown and burned it on September 19, then crossed the York River and seized Warner Hall. Bacon died in October, but the rebellion continued until early January 1677.

Warner served on a court-martial headed by Berkeley on January 11, 1677, at which rebels were executed. Berkeley called for elections, and Warner was not only elected to represent Gloucester County, but fellow burgesses elected him Speaker of the new House when it convened in February. The Assembly met until early April. It revoked all acts of the June 1676 Assembly, and then reenacted some.

== Later years ==
In late September – early October 1677, after Berkeley had been recalled and sailed for England, Warner was appointed to the Governor's Council. Although he remained aligned with the "Green Spring faction" of Berkeley loyalists after Berkeley's removal as governor, he was not removed from the Council, unlike such diehards as Philip Ludwell and Thomas Ballard.

Warner sued William Byrd I, a sometime ally of Bacon, for the damage the rebels had done to Warner Hall. Byrd claimed in his defense that he was Bacon's captive, not his supporter, and was not responsible.

== Personal life ==
About 1665 he married Mildred Reade, daughter of Sir George Reade and wife Elizabeth Martiau.

== Death, legacy and descendants ==
Warner died June 19, 1681, and was interred at Warner Hall.

Although looted in Bacon's Rebellion discussed above, Warner Hall survives today and has been listed on the National Register of Historic Places since 1980. Abingdon Church, the second building built on land Warner donated for spiritual purposes, also remains in use today. Despite periods of disuse and disrepair, it has been listed on the National Register since 1970.

Augustine Jr. had three sons, all of whom died unmarried, and three daughters, who inherited the Warner property and left many descendants:

- Mary, who, in 1680, married John Smith of Purton; they were ancestors of Queen Elizabeth II of the United Kingdom.
- Mildred, who, in about 1690, married Lawrence Washington (1659–1698); they were the paternal grandparents of George Washington; and
- Elizabeth, who, in about 1691, married John Lewis, and kept the Warner Hall house in the division of the Warner properties after the brothers' deaths. Elizabeth and John Lewis were the grandparents of Fielding Lewis, who married first George Washington's cousin, and second his sister, both ladies also being grandchildren of Mildred Warner. In addition, Elizabeth and John Lewis were the ancestors of Captain Meriwether Lewis of the Lewis and Clark Expedition.
