= Mildred Gale =

Paternal grandmother of George Washington

- Born: Mildred Warner; 1671; Gloucester County, Virginia, British America
- Died: January 30, 1701 (aged 29–30); Whitehaven, Kingdom of England
- Resting place: St Nicholas Church in Whitehaven
- Spouse: Lawrence Washington (m. 1685; died 1698) George Gale (m. 1700)
- Children: John Washington, III; Augustine Washington; Mildred Washington
- Parent(s): Augustine Warner Jr. Mildred Reade

Mildred Gale (1671–January 30, 1701), born Mildred Warner in the Colony of Virginia, was the paternal grandmother of Founding Father and first American president George Washington.

== Early life ==
Coat of arms of Augustine Warner Sr.

Warner was born in 1671, at Warner Hall, the family home in Gloucester County, Virginia, the daughter of Col. Augustine Warner Jr. (1642–1681) and Mildred Reade. Her paternal grandfather was Augustine Warner Sr.

== Family ==
Warner was one of three surviving children of her parents, all women. The other two were Elizabeth Warner and Mary Warner. All three married and left children and descendants.

== First marriage ==
Warner married Lawrence Washington (also spelled Laurence Washington) in 1685, a union that produced three children: John Washington, III (1692–1746), Augustine (1694–1743), and Mildred (1698–1747). Augustine would become the father of George Washington. Lawrence died in 1698, bequeathing to Mildred and the children shares in his estate, the profits from which were to be spent on their education.

== Second marriage ==
In 1700, she married George Gale of Whitehaven, England, a prominent merchant who helped forge trade links between Whitehaven, England and Virginia. She settled in Whitehaven and became pregnant. However, she contracted a fever and made her will before the baptism of her child. Gale died on 30 January 1701. Her will placed care of the Washington children in the hands of George, although this was later challenged in the Virginia courts by Lawrence's cousin John Washington, and their custody passed to him. Her will left most of the property she had inherited from her late husband to George Gale. John Washington challenged this in court also.

== Death ==
Gale was buried in the grounds of St Nicholas's Church in Whitehaven alongside her baby daughter and slave, Jane. The exact whereabouts of her grave is unknown, due to several graveyard re-arrangements and a subsequent fire in the church in 1971, but a commemorative plaque is in the garden of the church.

== See also ==
- Washington family
