= Lawrence Washington (1659–1698) =

American planter, slave holder, lawyer, soldier and politician

Member of the House of Burgesses representing Westmoreland County
- In office 1684–1686 Serving with Isaac Allerton Jr., William Hardidge, Thomas Yowell
- Preceded by: William Hardidge
- Succeeded by: William Hardidge
- In office 1691–1692 Serving with William Hardidge
- Preceded by: William Hardidge
- Succeeded by: Thomas Yowell

Personal details
- Born: September 1659 Bridges Creek, Westmoreland County, Colony of Virginia
- Died: February 1698 (aged 38) Warner Hall, Gloucester County, Colony of Virginia
- Resting place: Wakefield, Colony of Virginia, English America
- Spouse: Mildred Warner
- Relations: Washington family
- Children: John Washington III; Augustine Washington; Mildred Washington
- Parent(s): John Washington; Anne Pope
- Occupation: Lawyer, soldier, planter, slave holder, politician

Lawrence Washington (September 1659 – February 1698) was a colonial-era Virginia planter, slave holder, lawyer, soldier and politician. He was the paternal grandfather of George Washington.

== Early life and education ==
Lawrence was born in September 1659, on his father's estate at Mattox Creek. When he was five years old, the family moved to a nearby plantation on Bridges Creek, in Westmoreland County, Colony of Virginia. He was named to honor his paternal grandfather, former Oxford don and High Church Anglican Rector Rev. Lawrence Washington. His father, John Washington, had emigrated from Essex, England and married Anne Pope. His mother (who died when Lawrence was a child) was the daughter and heiress of Col. Nathaniel Pope, a merchant and planter who had emigrated first to Maryland, then to Virginia's Northern Neck decades earlier. Col. Pope had given his son-in-law start-up capital and the property as a marriage present, and died shortly before his first grandson's birth. Before her death, Ann Pope bore two more children who survived to adulthood: John Washington (c. 1660 – 1698) and Anne Washington Wright (c. 1660 – 1697). The widower John Washington married twice more, both times to widows, with whom he did not have children but substantially increased his landholdings.

After a private education in Virginia as befit his class, Lawrence was sent to England to complete his studies, including training as a lawyer.

== Career ==
As the Washington family's eldest son, Lawrence received the benefits of primogeniture. Upon his father's death when Lawrence was 18 years old, he inherited two substantial estates on the Potomac River: Mattox Creek (1,850 acres) and Little Hunting Creek (2,500 acres) (which would eventually be renamed Mount Vernon by Lawrence's grandson and namesake, Lawrence Washington). Washington did not add substantially to either property during his lifetime, which some historians believe indicates his greater interest in politics and the law rather than plantations, although he also left personal property to support his widow and children, including 406 pounds sterling and 32,509 pounds of tobacco.

Lawrence Washington assumed public responsibilities in Westmoreland County based on his landownership, and three times (first in 1684) won election to the House of Burgesses to represent Westmoreland County's interests. Thus, he served for about a decade, with the exception of the 1688 session that was suppressed. He had begun his county service as one of the justices of the peace in 1680, and in 1684 Lawrence Washington became colonel of the county militia. He also served two years as the county Sheriff. Lawrence Washington also continued his father's roles as the county coroner, and took special interest in guardianships and estates, serving as trustee of the estate of Thomas Pope, the orphan Jan Hay, and Daniel Lisson's daughter born after his death.

== Family life ==
In 1688, Lawrence married Mildred Warner, one of three daughters of Mildred Reade and the wealthy Gloucester County planter Augustine Warner Jr. During the decade of their marriage, they had three children:

- John Washington III (1692–1746)
- Augustine Washington (1694–1743)
- Mildred Washington (1698–1747)

== Death and legacy ==
Lawrence died at the age of 38 in February 1698, and was interred in the family cemetery at Bridge's Creek. His widow Mildred Warner Washington married George Gale, who moved the family to Whitehaven, England. Mildred survived her husband by three years, dying in 1701 at age 30 following a difficult childbirth. Her will named Gale as her children's guardian, but in 1704 Lawrence's cousin John Washington successfully petitioned to have custody transferred to him. At that point, the three Washington children returned to Virginia, where they lived near Chotank Creek. John Washington thus had the use of the lands and personal property they had inherited while he acted as their guardian.
