= George Washington Birthplace National Monument =

550 acres in Virginia (US) managed by the National Park Service

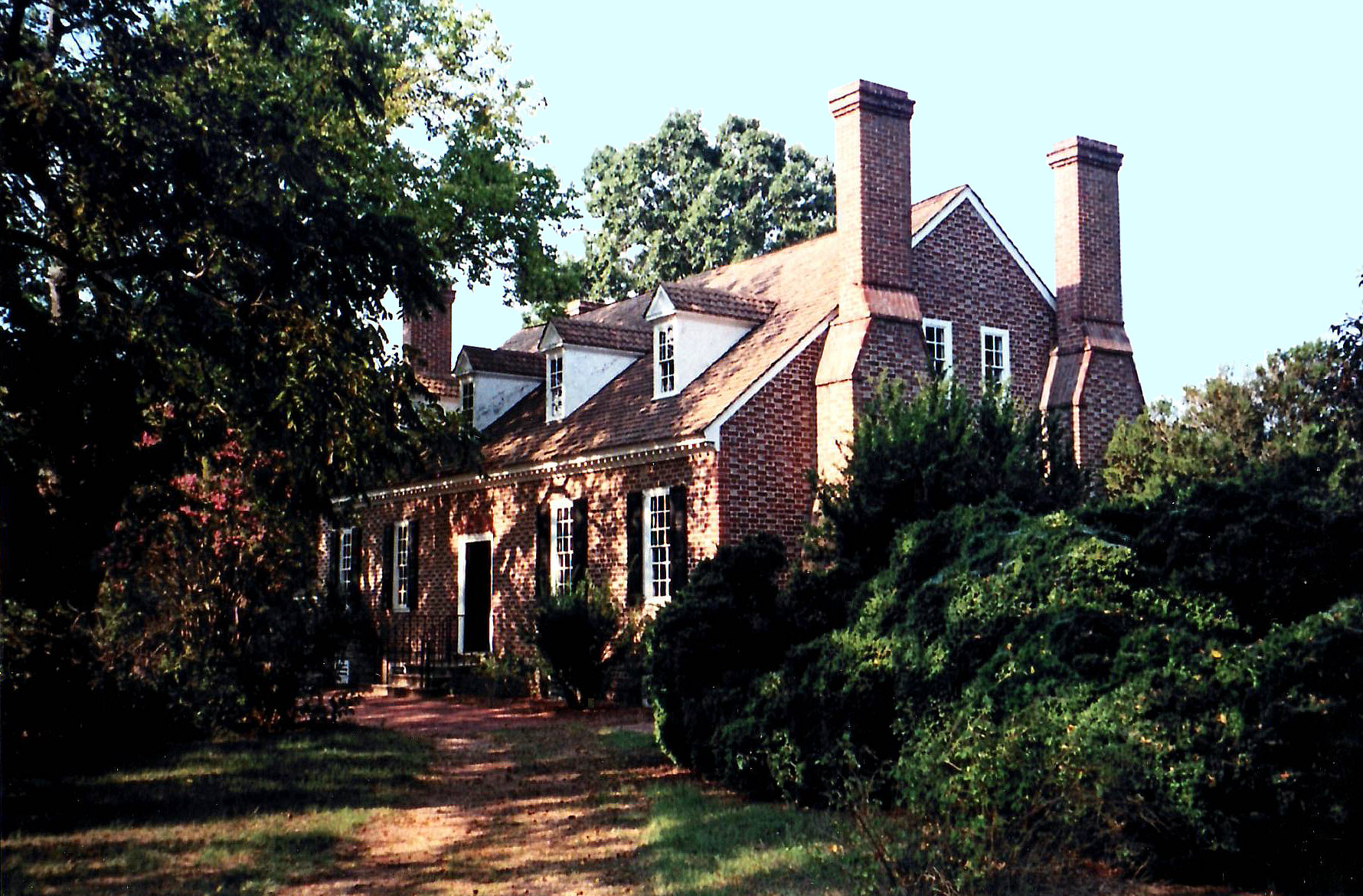

- Location within Virginia Location within the United States
- Interactive map of George Washington Birthplace National Monument
- Location: Westmoreland County, Virginia, U.S.
- Nearest city: Colonial Beach, Virginia, U.S.
- Coordinates: 38°11′8″N 76°54′59″W
- Area: 661.7 acres (267.8 ha)
- Established: January 23, 1930
- Visitors: 72,072 (in 2025)
- Governing body: National Park Service
- Website: George Washington Birthplace National Monument
- George Washington Birthplace National Monument
- U.S. National Register of Historic Places
- Virginia Landmarks Register
- NRHP reference No.: 66000850
- VLR No.: 096-0026

Significant dates
- Added to NRHP: October 15, 1966
- Designated VLR: October 18, 1983

The George Washington Birthplace National Monument is a national monument in Westmoreland County, Virginia, at the confluence of Popes Creek and the Potomac River. It commemorates the birthplace location of George Washington, a Founding Father and the first President of the United States, who was born there on February 22, 1732. Washington lived at the residence until age three and later returned to live there as a teenager.

== History ==
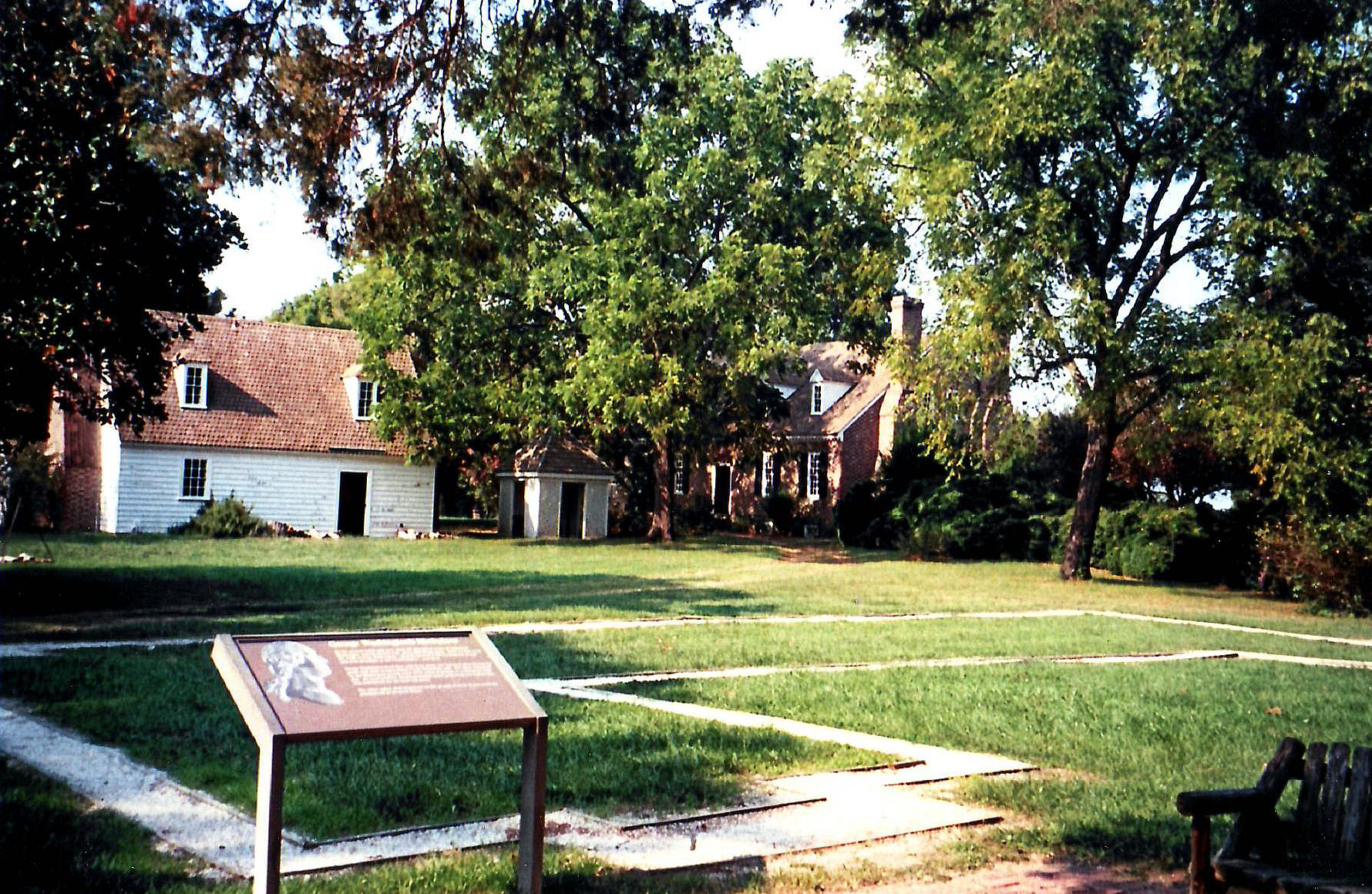
Foundation outline in the foreground marking Washington's birthplace near the memorial house (right rear)

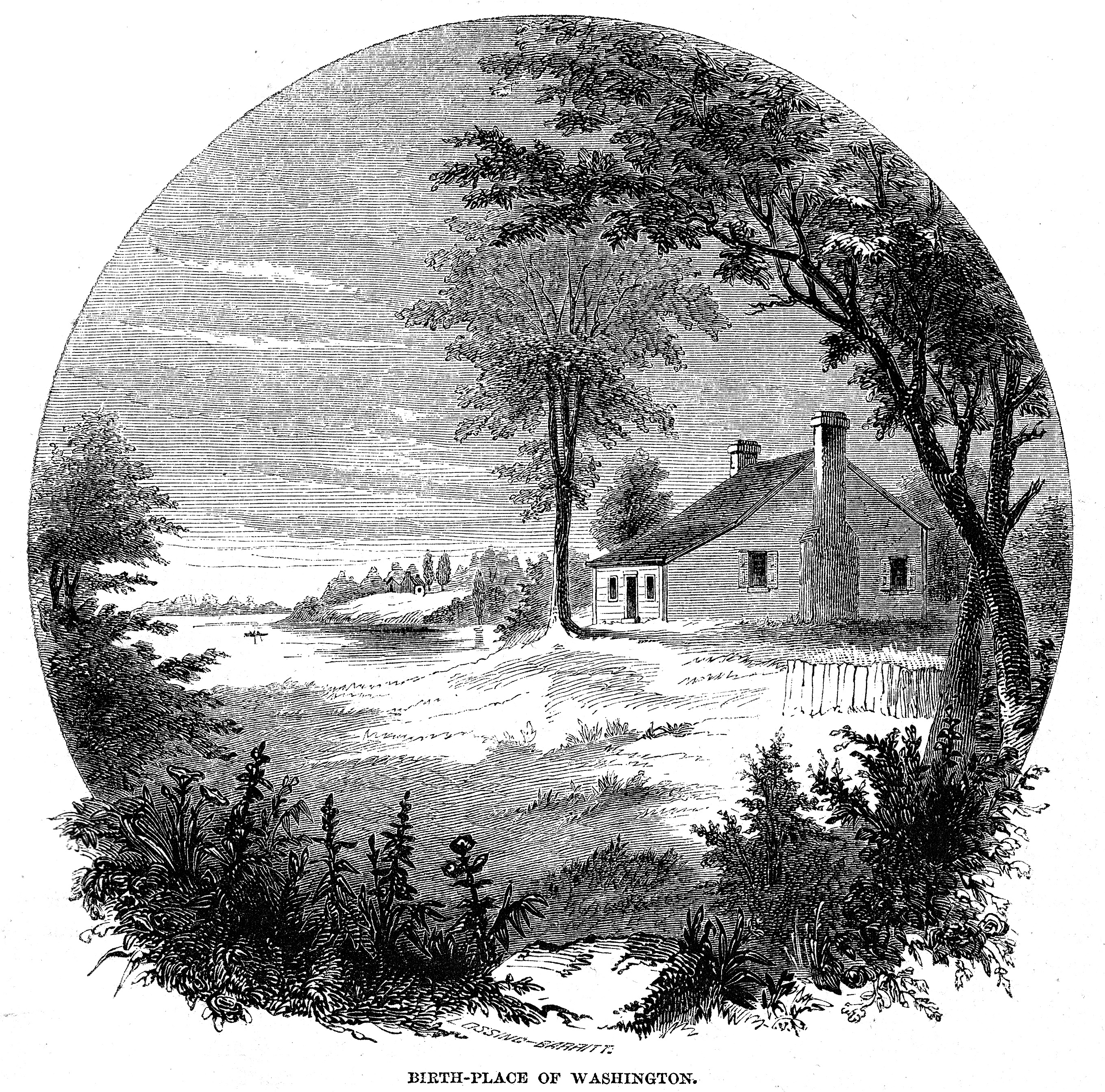
Wakefield Popes Creek Estate, Washington's birthplace

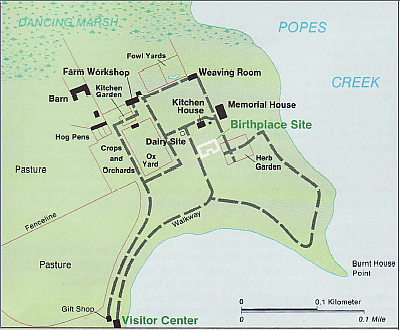
Map of George Washington's birthplace

=== 17th–18th centuries ===
John Washington, George Washington's great-grandfather, settled this plantation in 1657 at the original property on Bridges Creek. The family acquired expanded land to the south toward nearby Popes Creek.

Prior to 1718, the first section of the house was built. His father enlarged it between 1722–1726. He added on to it by the mid-1770s, making a ten-room house known as "Wakefield". This house, which George Washington in 1792 would describe as "the ancient mansion seat," was destroyed by fire and flood on Christmas Day 1779, and never rebuilt.

George Washington was born in the house on February 22, 1732. Thirty-two graves of Washington family members have been found at the Bridges Creek cemetery plot, including George's half-brother, father, grandfather, and great-grandfather.

Washington's father owned enslaved people and had them cultivate tobacco on his several plantations, as his ancestors had done.

=== 19th century ===
In 1858, the Commonwealth of Virginia acquired the property to preserve the homesite and cemetery. In 1882, however, Virginia donated the land to the federal government following the Civil War.

=== 20th century ===
The Wakefield National Memorial Association was formed in 1923 to restore the property. In 1930, the grounds were authorized by Congress as a U.S. National Monument. In 1931, the Wakefield Association received a grant from John D. Rockefeller Jr., to acquire and transfer a total of 394 acres (1.59 km^{2}) of land to the Federal government.

Since the exact appearance of the original Washington family home is not known, a Memorial House was designed by Edward Donn Jr., representing similar buildings of the era; it was constructed on the approximate site in 1931. The actual location of Washington's boyhood home is adjacent to the memorial house and its foundation is outlined in the ground by crushed oyster shells.

The Memorial House represents a typical tobacco plantation of the period of the original's construction. The Memorial House is constructed of bricks handmade from local clay. It has a central hallway and four rooms on each floor, furnished in the 1730–1750 period style by the Wakefield National Memorial Association. Furnishings include an 18th-century tea table believed to have been in the original house. Most of the other furnishings are more than 200 years old. At the entrance to the grounds, now maintained and operated by the National Park Service, is a Memorial Shaft obelisk of Vermont marble; it is a one-tenth scale replica of the Washington Monument in Washington, D.C.

The park and Memorial House were opened by the National Park Service in 1932, on the 200th anniversary of George Washington's birth.

=== 21st century ===
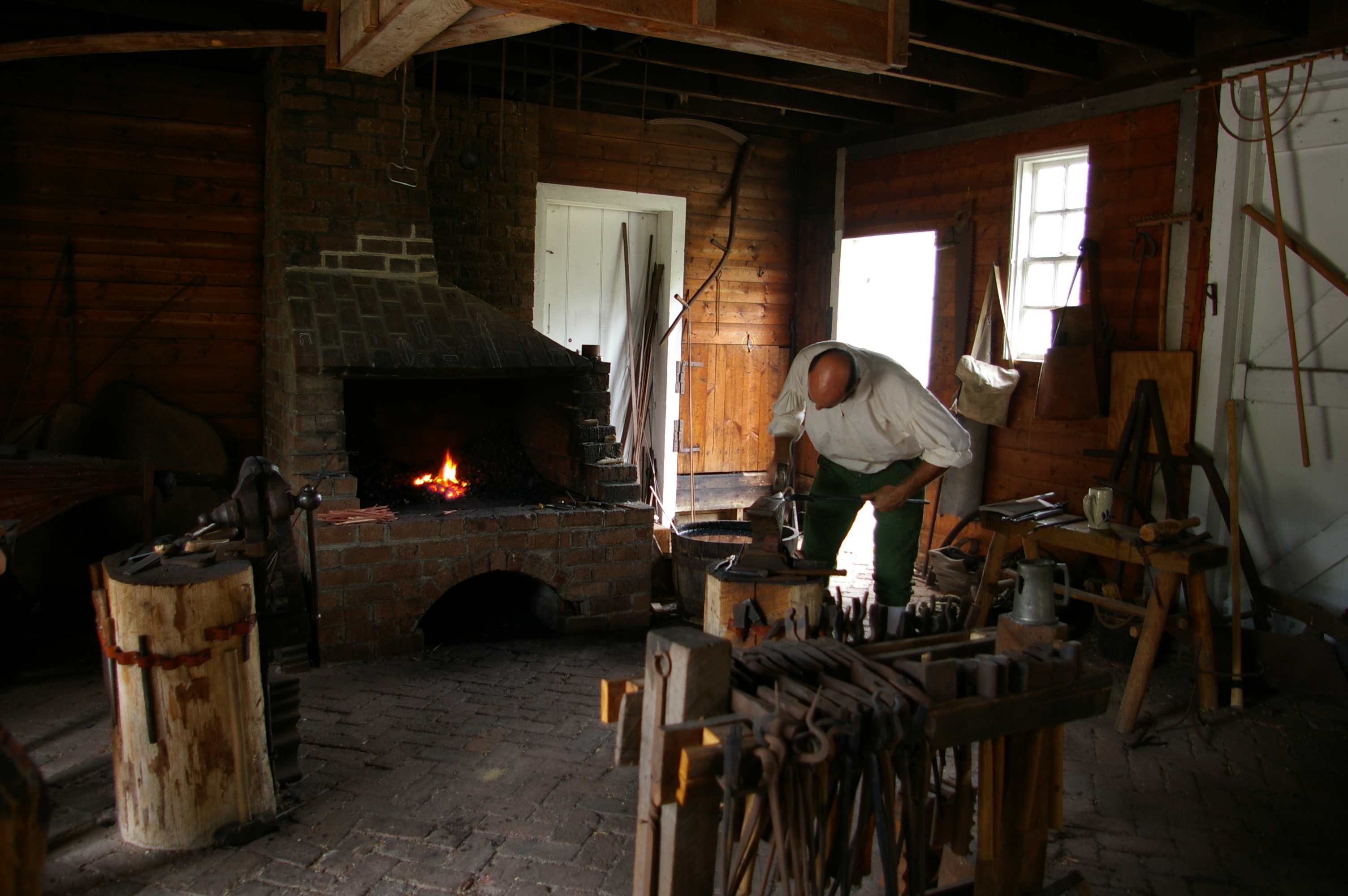
Blacksmith shop

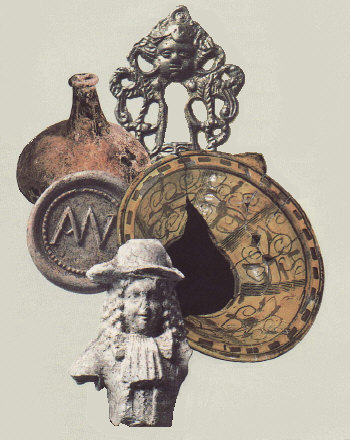
Artifacts at Visitors Center

In the 21st century, the Monument is part of the National Park Service's ongoing efforts to interpret historical resources. In addition to the Memorial House, park facilities open to visitors include the historic birthplace home area, Kitchen House, hiking trails, and picnic grounds. In the Kitchen House, costumed re-enactors demonstrate candle- and soap-making.

A colonial herb and flower garden has been planted with herbs and flowers common to Washington's time, including thyme, sage, basil, and flowers such as hollyhocks, forget-me-nots, and roses. Typical trees and bushes of Washington's time have also been added to the landscaping. The Colonial Living Farm has a barn and pasture and raises livestock, poultry, and crops that were typical in the 18th century and using farming methods that were common at the time.

Visitors may also tour the Washington family Burial Ground, which contains the graves of 32 members of the Washington family, including George Washington's father, grandfather, and great-grandfather. Replicas of two original gravestones are visible, along with five memorial tablets placed here in the 1930s.

The Visitors' Center contains artifacts recovered from the burned-down Washington house, including a bowl, clay figurine, wine bottle seal belonging to Augustine Washington, wine bottle, and keyhole plate.

A 15-minute film depicting Washington family life is shown in a theater at the Visitors' Center.

== Directions ==
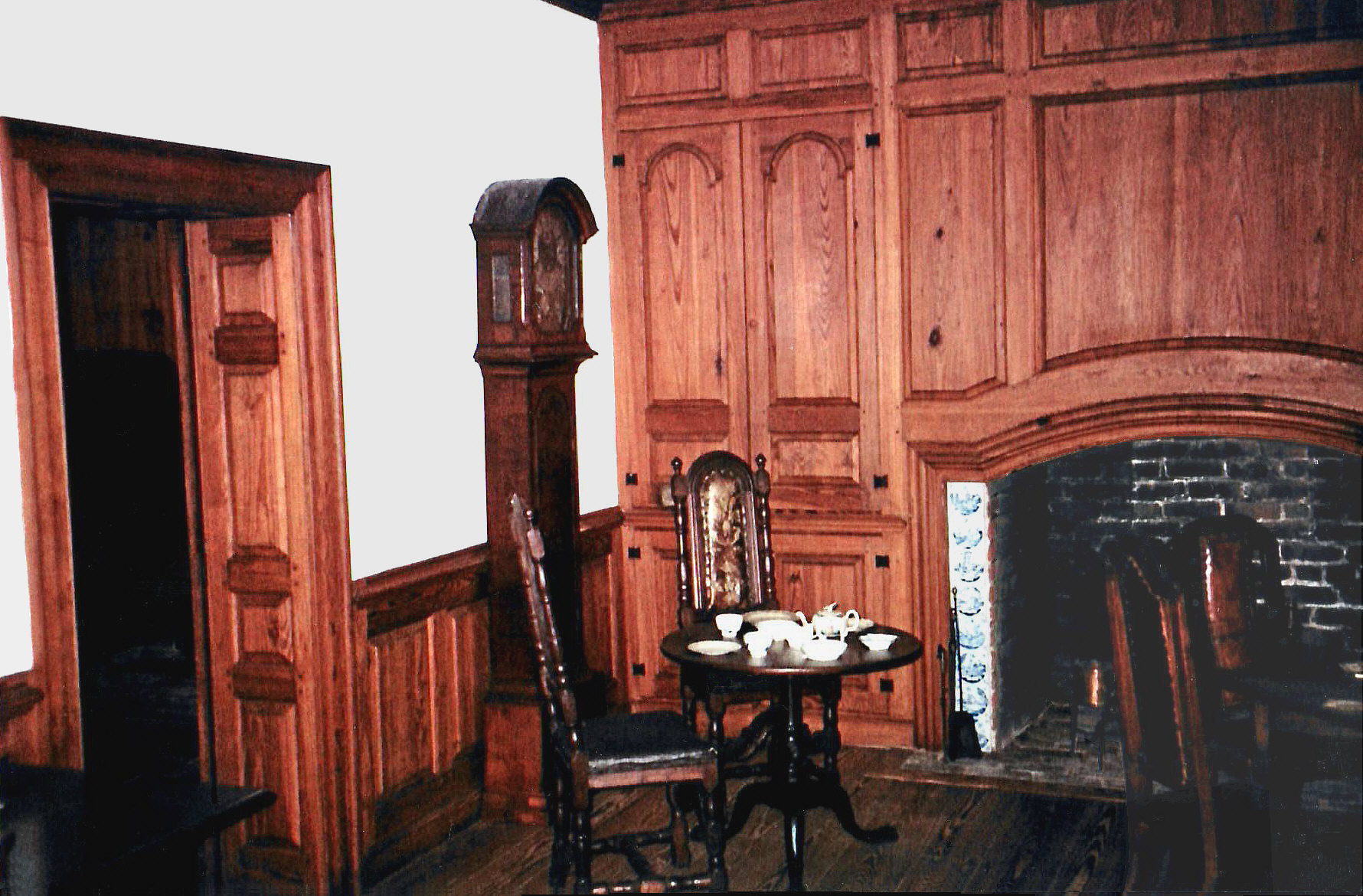
The Memorial House interior – the tea table is from the original house.

The George Washington Birthplace National Monument is 38 miles (61 km) east of Fredericksburg, Virginia, located on the Northern Neck. It can be reached via VA Route 204, the access road to the site from VA State Route 3.

== See also ==
- List of national monuments of the United States
- List of residences of presidents of the United States
- Northern Neck George Washington Birthplace AVA
- Washington's Birthday
- Montross, Virginia
- Stratford Hall Plantation
- State Route 204, the access road to the site from State Route 3
