= Mount Vernon Mansion replicas =

Architectural heritage in United States

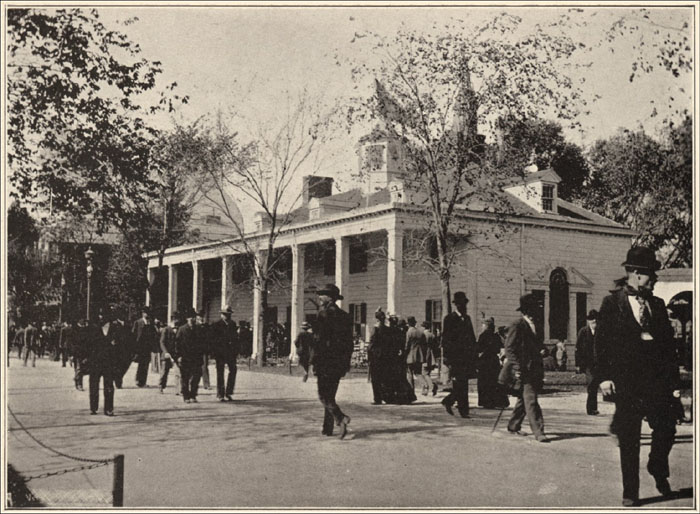
Virginia State Building (1893, demolished), World's Columbian Exposition, Chicago, Illinois.

Mount Vernon Mansion replicas are faithful copies or buildings inspired by Mount Vernon, the mansion of U.S. President George Washington in Fairfax County, Virginia, United States. Such buildings usually feature Mount Vernon's iconic piazza but might also copy its cupola, distinct dimensions, red-white-and-green color scheme, asymmetrical window distribution, or three-part organization.

George Washington's Mount Vernon and architectural historian Lydia Mattice Brandt began a digital humanities project that collects information on Mount Vernon replicas. It crowd-sources information and locates Mount Vernon look-alikes on an interactive map.

== Exposition buildings ==
Full-sized replicas of the Mount Vernon mansion were built for six international expositions:

- 1893 - Virginia State Building, World's Columbian Exposition, Chicago, Illinois. Demolished.
- 1915 - Virginia State Building, Panama-Pacific Exposition, San Francisco, California. Demolished.
- 1926 - Young Women's Christian Association Building, Sesquicentennial Exposition, Philadelphia, Pennsylvania, Magaziner, Eberhard & Harris, architects. Demolished.
- 1931 - United States Building, Exposition Coloniale, Paris, Charles K. Bryant, architect. Relocated to Vaucresson, France.
- 1932 - New York George Washington Bicentennial Commission Building, Prospect Park, Brooklyn, New York City, Charles K. Bryant, architect. Demolished.
- 1933 - Colonial Village, Century of Progress Exposition, Chicago, Illinois, Charles K. Bryant, architect. Relocated to Beverly Shores, Indiana and later demolished.
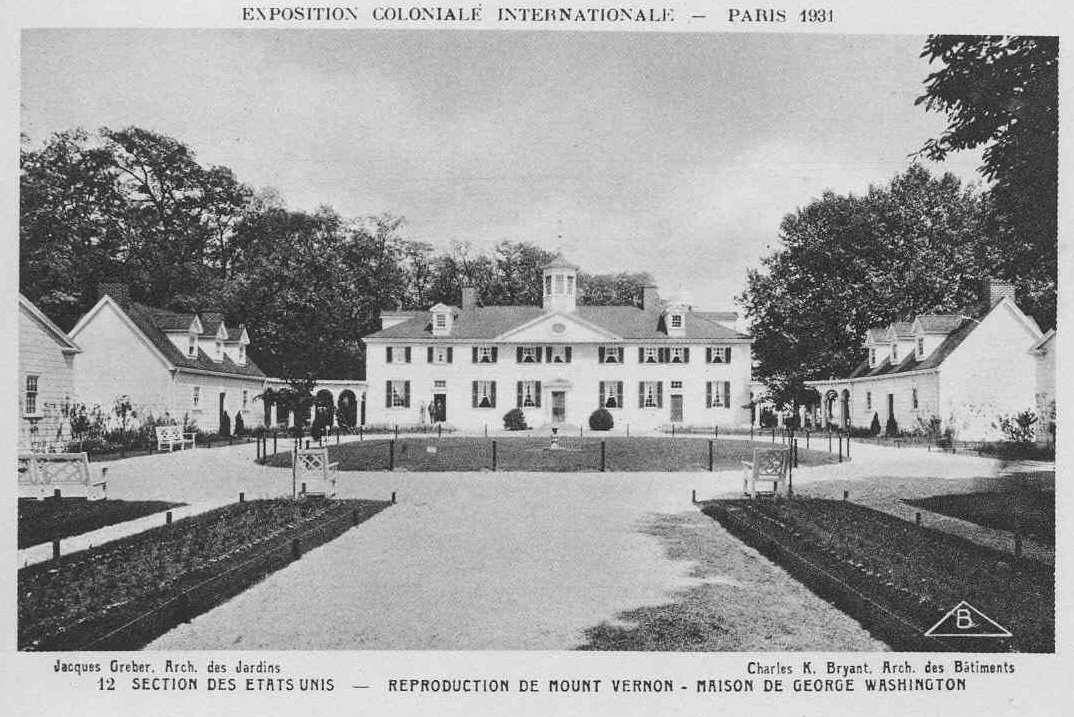
United States Building (1931), Exposition Coloniale, Paris, France.

== Residences ==
- Bushfield (c.1760), Westmoreland County, Virginia. The Mount Vernon-inspired cupola and 2-story portico were added c.1910. Architect Waddy Butler Wood restored the house in 1916.
- Oak Hill (1790), Annandale, Virginia. The Mount Vernon-inspired 2-story portico was added c.1940.
- Hill-Stead (1901), Alfred Atmore Pope residence, Farmington, Connecticut, Theodate Pope Riddle and McKim, Mead and White, architects. Now Hill-Stead Museum.
- Mount Vernon (1930), H. L. Hunt residence, 4009 West Lawther Drive, Dallas, Texas.
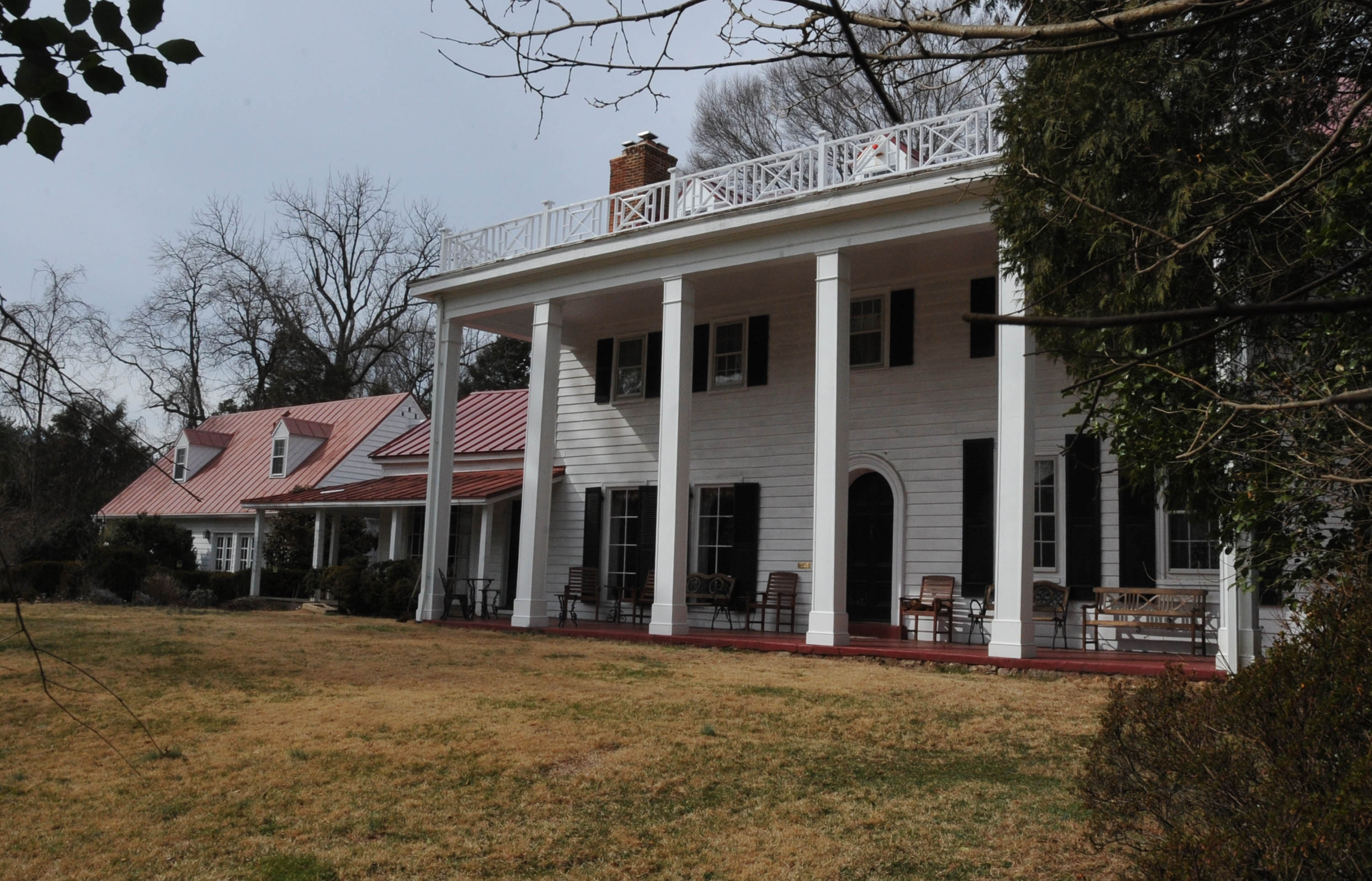
Oak Hill (1790), Annandale, Virginia.

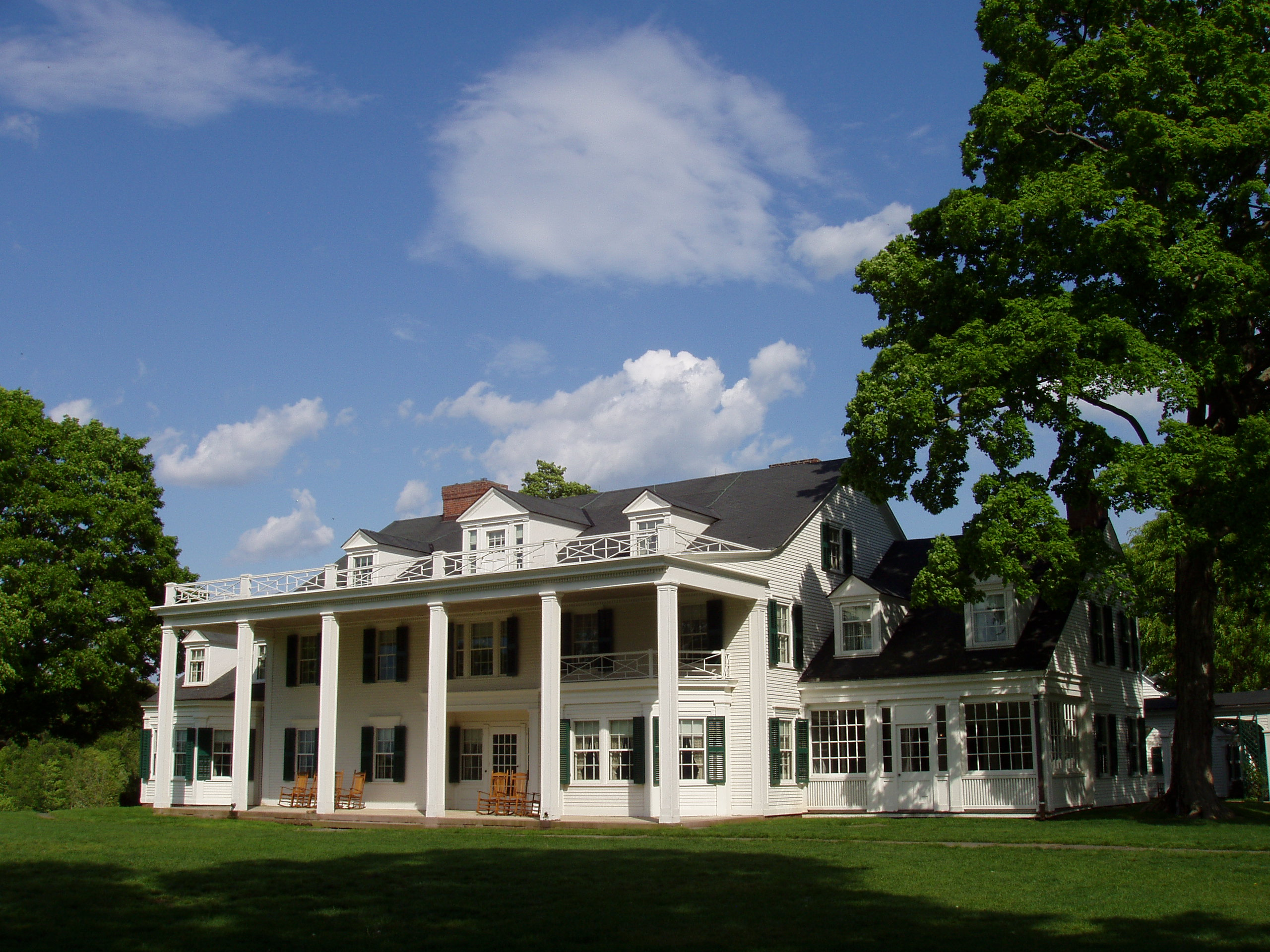
Hill-Stead (1901), Farmington, Connecticut.

== Other buildings ==
- Rainier Chapter House (1920–1925), Daughters of the American Revolution, 800 East Roy Street, Seattle, Washington, Daniel Riggs Huntington, architect.
- Washington's Birthday Celebration Association Building, 1819 East Hillside Road, Laredo, Texas.
- Mount Vernon Office (1987), Arlington Cemetery, 2900 State Road, Drexel Hill, Pennsylvania.
- Washington Hall (1999), American Village, 3727 AL-119, Montevallo, Alabama.
- George Washington Inn (2008), 939 Finn Hall Road, Port Angeles, Washington.
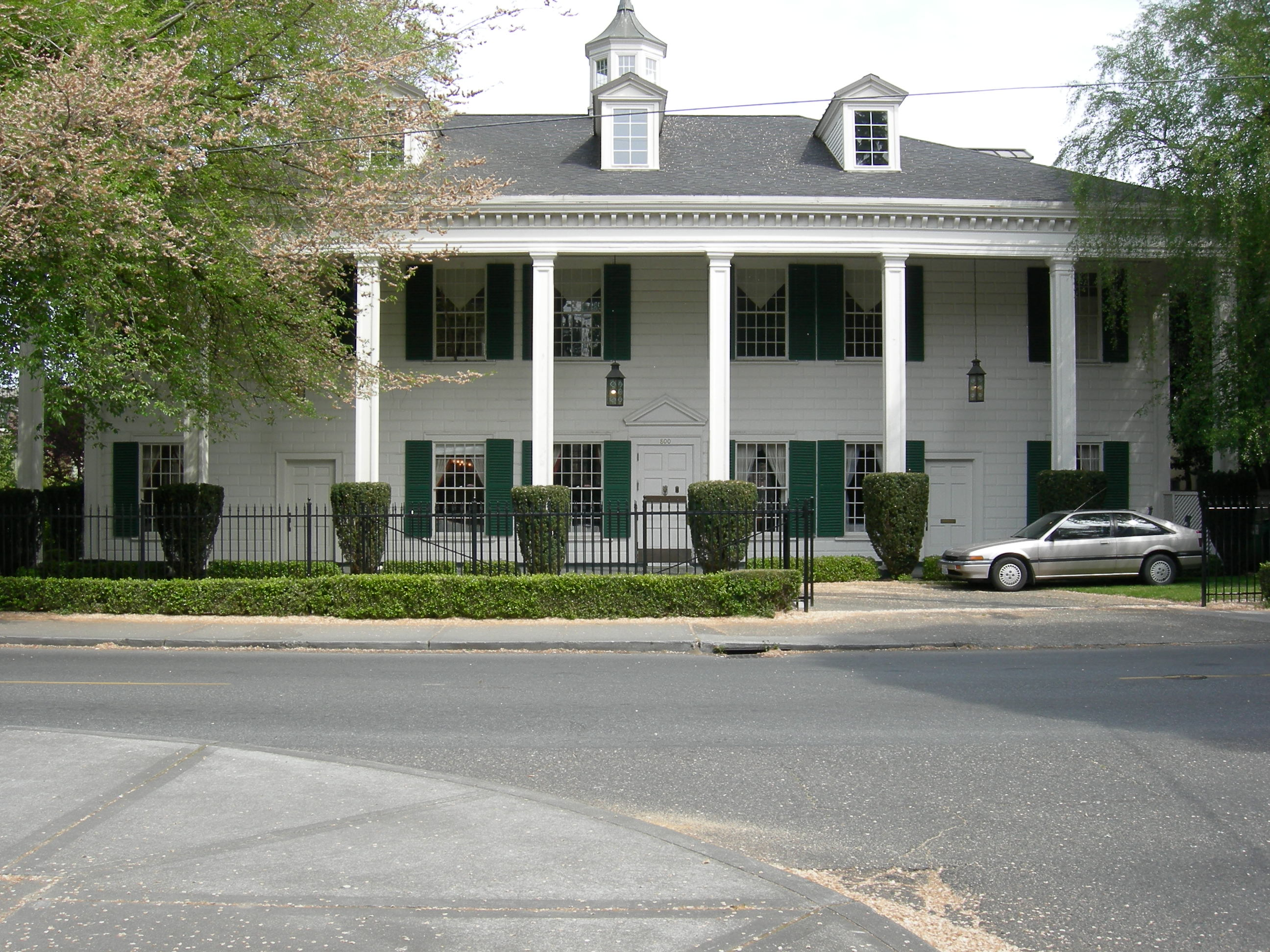
Rainier Chapter House (1920–1925), DAR, Seattle, Washington.

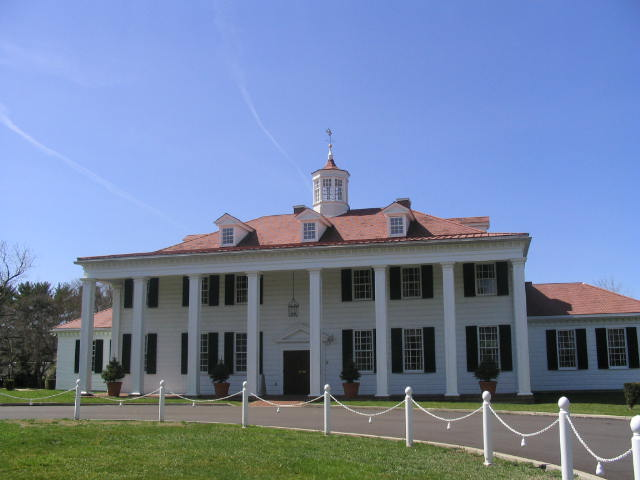
Mount Vernon Office (1987), Arlington Cemetery, Drexel Hill, Pennsylvania.

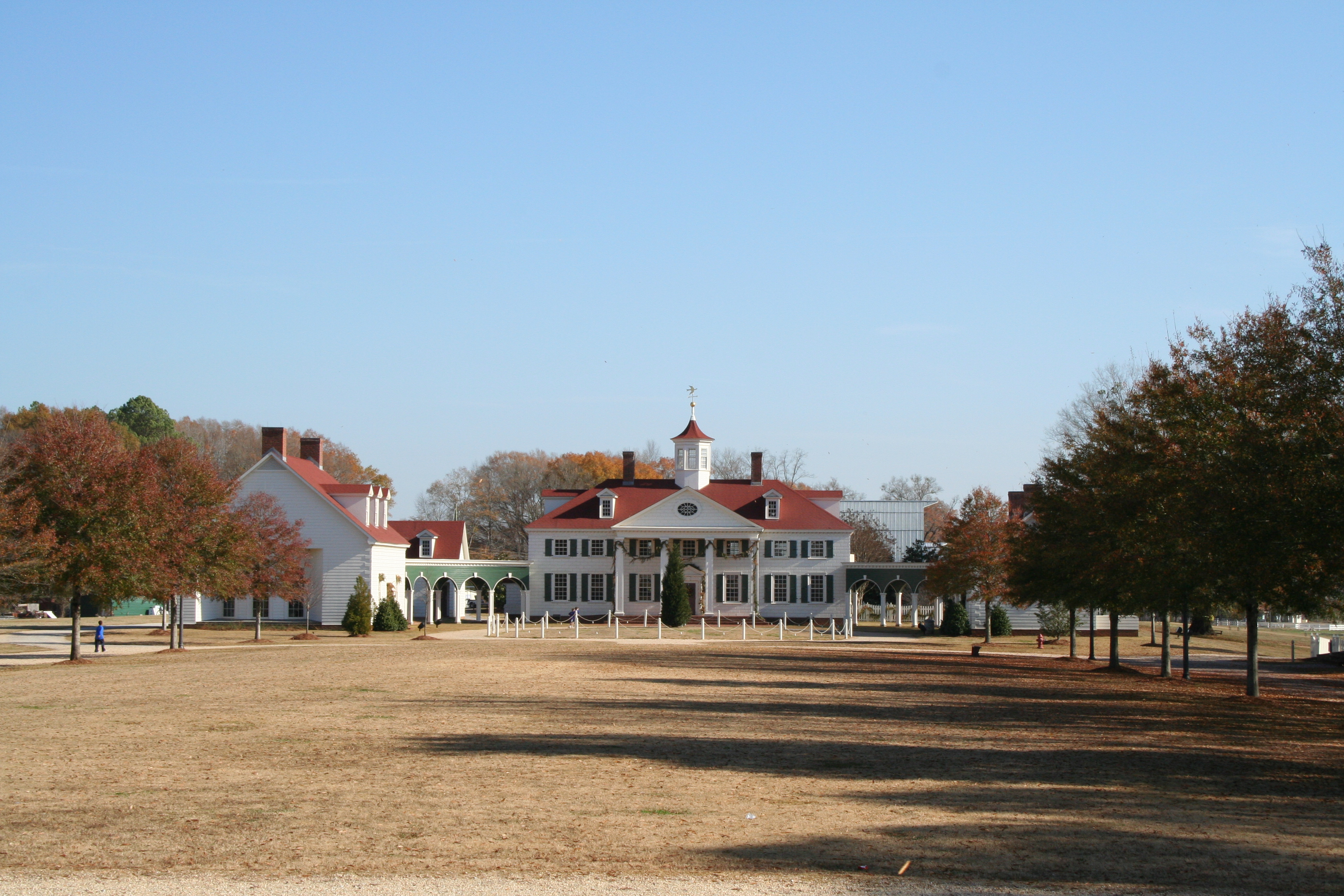
Washington Hall (1999), American Village, Montevallo, Alabama.

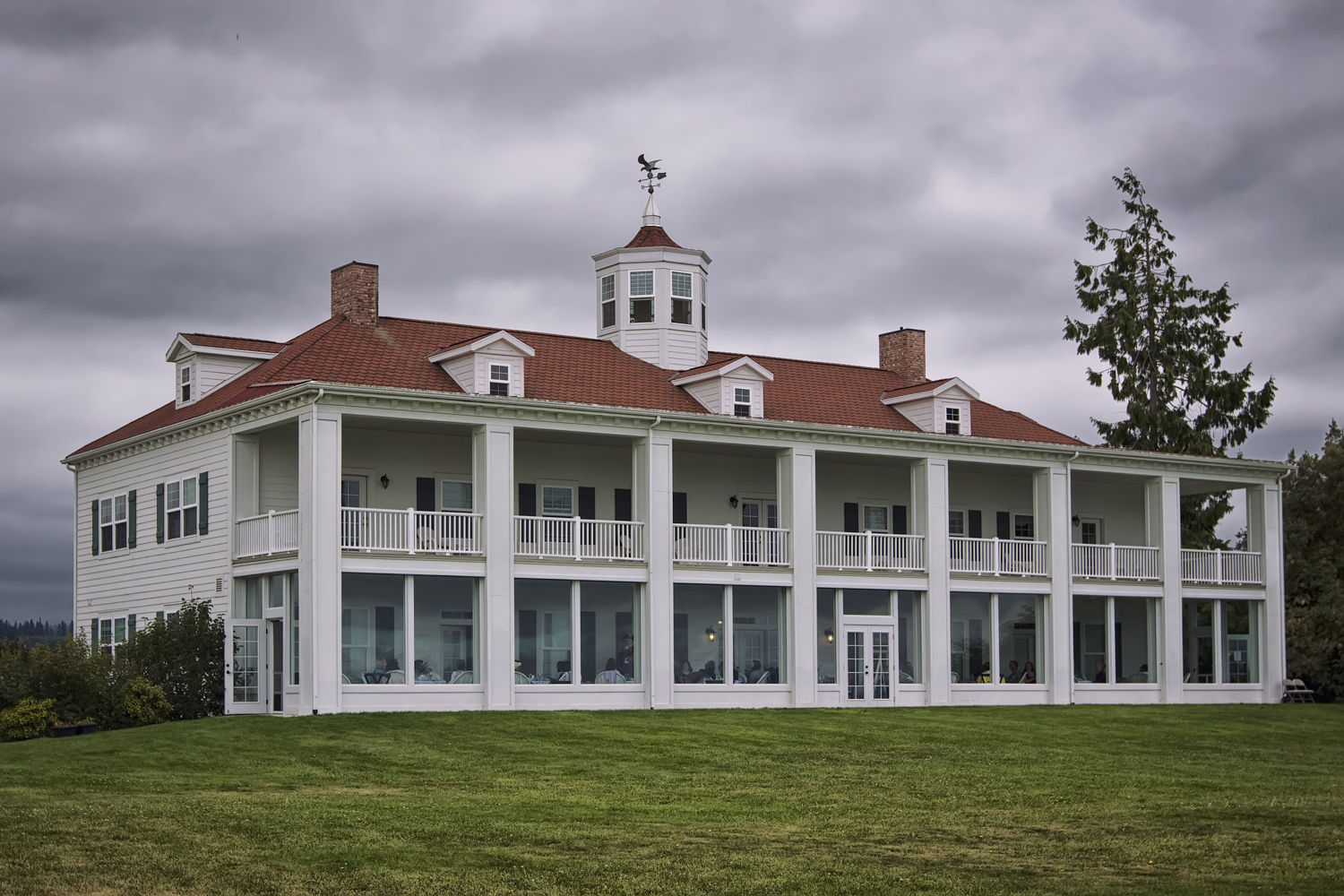
George Washington Inn (2008), Port Angeles, Washington.
