= George Washington's Rye Whiskey =

Rye whiskey distillery

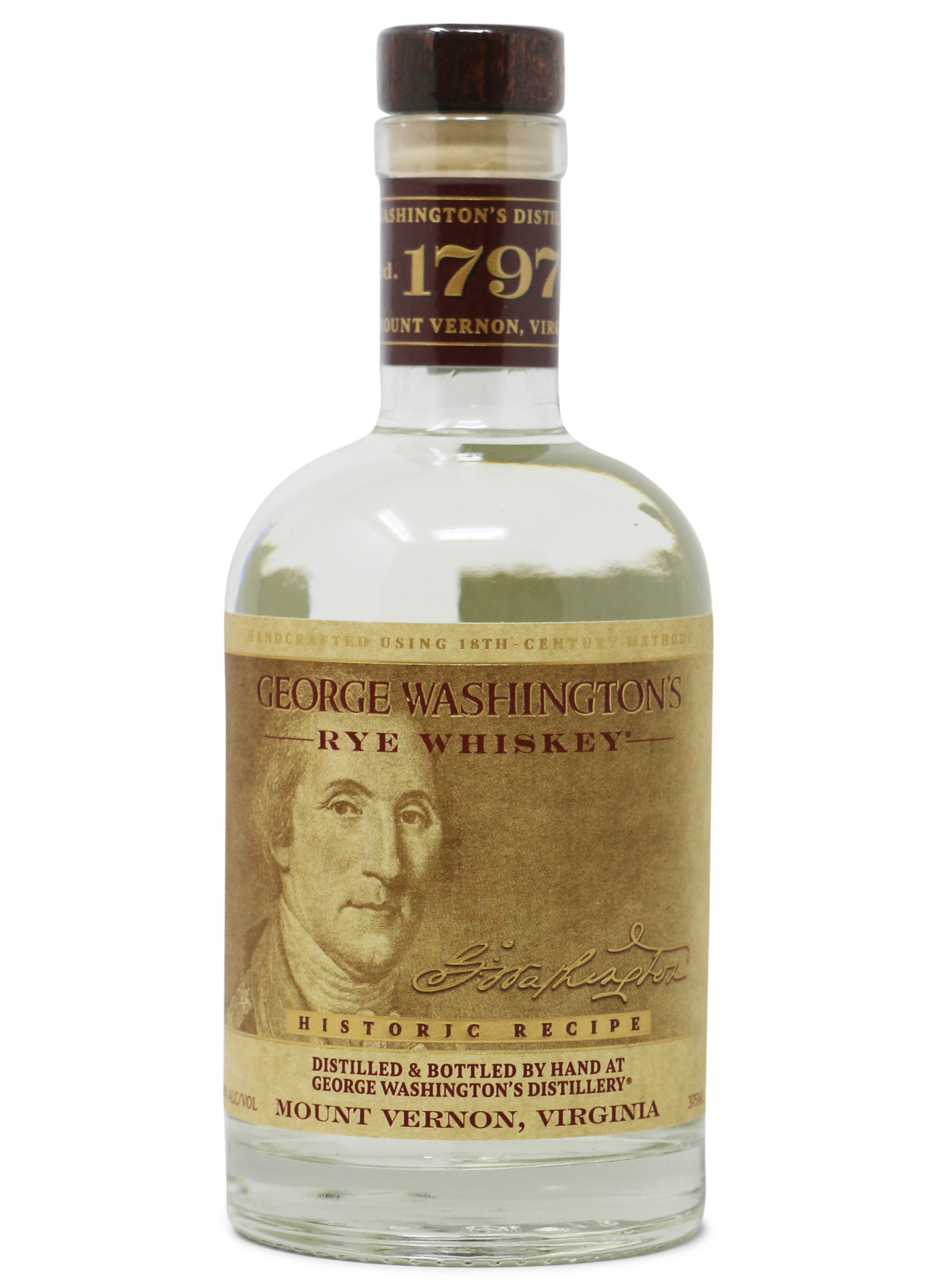
Bottle of George Washington's Rye Whiskey

George Washington's Rye Whiskey is distilled at George Washington's reconstructed distillery at Mount Vernon from a recipe discovered by scholars examining the distillery ledgers for 1798 and 1799. It is distilled in limited quantities and only available for purchase in person. In 1797, urged on by his farm manager, James Anderson, Washington ramped up production and it produced 600 gallons. In 1799, the year Washington died, the distillery produced nearly 11,000 gallons, making it the largest whiskey distillery in America at that time.

After close to a decade of archaeological excavation and reconstruction planning by historians and historical trade interpreters, the building began operation in 2007 using five copper pot stills on the footprints of the original ones. The first batch of whiskey was released in 2010. On March 22, 2017, Governor Terry McAuliffe signed a bill sponsored by Virginia Senator Adam Ebbin (D-30th) designating George Washington's Rye Whiskey as the official state spirit of the Commonwealth of Virginia.

== Ingredients ==
60 percent rye, 35 percent corn and 5 percent malted barley.

== Process ==
The staff uses Washington's original mash bill and 18th-century methods. The grain is processed in Washington's water-powered gristmill, fermented in wooden mash tubs and distilled in copper pot stills heated by wood fires. In Washington's time whiskey was not aged but this recipe calls for it to be distilled twice.

== See also ==
- George Washington's Fishery, another 18th century Mount Vernon business
