= Distilled Spirits Council of the United States =

Distilled Spirits Council of the United States Inc
- Abbreviation: DISCUS
- Founded: 1973; 53 years ago
- Merger of: Bourbon Institute, Distilled Spirits Institute, Licensed Beverage Industries Inc
- Tax ID no.: 52-0971454
- Legal status: 501(c)(6)
- Headquarters: Washington, D.C., U.S.
- Board Chair: Deirdre Mahlan
- President, Chief Executive Officer: Chris R. Swonger
- Subsidiaries: DISCUS PAC _{527(f)}, DISCUS TEXAS PAC _{527(f)}
- Revenue: $16,778,517 (2016)
- Expenses: $17,102,359 (2016)
- Employees: 46 (2016)
- Volunteers: 14 (2016)
- Website: www.distilledspirits.org

The Distilled Spirits Council of the United States (DISCUS) is a national trade association representing producers and marketers of distilled spirits sold in the United States. DISCUS was formed in 1973 by the merger of three organizations (the Bourbon Institute, the Distilled Spirits Institute, and the Licensed Beverage Industries, Inc.) that had been in existence for decades.

== About ==
Members of DISCUS represent approximately 70 percent of all distilled spirits brands sold in the United States. Members are: Agave Loco, Beam Suntory, Bacardi, Brown-Forman, Campari Group, Constellation Brands, Edrington, Jägermeister, MGP, MHW, Moet Hennessy, Pernod Ricard, and Rémy Cointreau. In addition to full membership, DISCUS offers a Craft Distiller Affiliate Member program with 80 members as of March 2014.

In May 2016, DISCUS said it dropped its DISCUS acronym and would use "Distilled Spirits Council" for the short form of its name in order to "modernize the association's public presence". In 2018, it said it would further shorten the short form of its name to just "the Council". In 2019, under the guidance of the new CEO Chris Swonger, Distilled Spirits Council went back to using the full name, Distilled Spirits Council of the United States.

== Standards ==
DISCUS developed a set of voluntary guidelines that they suggest the spirits industry and council members follow. The code provides for a review board to review complaints about advertising and marketing materials in the marketplace. In 2003, DISCUS began issuing semi-annual public reports describing the review board complaints and decisions. As of March 2013, DISCUS has posted some "pre-publication" results on its website to show preliminary drafts of the content in its reports prior to publication of a final semi-annual code-of-conduct action report. (As of October 2016, the most recent semi-annual report on the DISCUS website was for a period that ended more than six years earlier.)

== Lobbying efforts ==
DISCUS lobbies on behalf of the distilled spirits industry on policy and legislative issues. DISCUS's team of lawyers, economists, scientists, lobbyists and public affairs professionals work to support legislation that increases adult market access to spirits products, including laws expanding Sunday spirits sales and spirits tastings. DISCUS also works to protect the distilled beverage industry from increased alcohol taxes and to reduce tariffs and trade barriers on spirits products across the globe.

In 2019, The Distilled Spirits Council of the United States launched an advocacy alliance initiative called "Spirits United" in coordination with TIPS, an alcohol server and seller training organization, and the American Distilling Institute. Spirits United is a grassroots website advocating for adult consumers to enjoy distilled spirits where they want, how they want, and when they want. Spirits United consists of professionals in the distilled spirits industry, partners, customers and consumers. By joining Spirits United, advocates have the opportunity to learn, influence, and engage on issues that impact the distilled spirits.

Chris Swonger, president and CEO of DISCUS, said "Our goal is to build out Spirits United so that spirits advocates in any city or state can be quickly mobilized to engage with their elected officials."

The council lobbied the Department of Health and Human Services, led by Robert F. Kennedy Jr., to eliminate drinking limit recommendations and public warnings linking the consumption of alcohol to cancer and other health risks.

== Programs and funding ==
=== Alcohol abuse prevention ===
The spirits industry has initiated and supported responsibility programs to promote responsible and moderate alcohol consumption. DISCUS developed an educational tool kit and distributed it to more than 3,000 health professionals.

=== American Whiskey Trail and George Washington's distillery ===
DISCUS has launched several initiatives to promote and preserve the cultural history of distilling and spirits in the United States, most notably in the creation of the American Whiskey Trail and the reconstruction of the distillery built by George Washington near his home at Mount Vernon. Since 2000, DISCUS member companies and wholesalers have contributed more than $2.1 million to rebuild the distillery, which was one of the largest whiskey distilling operations in early America.

Washington's Mount Vernon distillery marks the beginning of the organization's American Whiskey Trail, a DISCUS program promoting the cultural heritage and history of spirits in America. Launched in 2004, the trail features operating distilleries and historic sites in five states.
