= George Washington Inn =

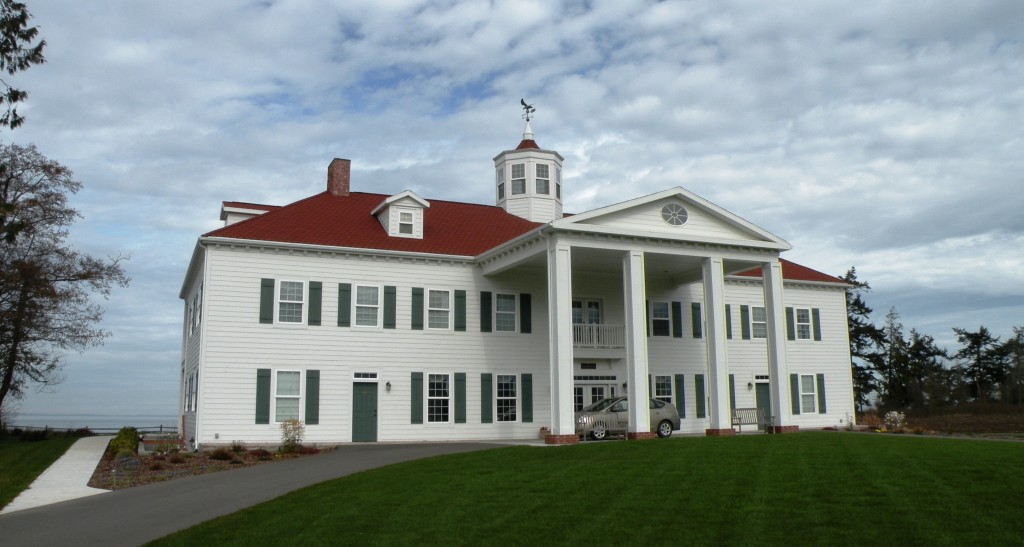

- Location within Washington (state)

General information
- Location: Port Angeles, Washington, 939 Finn Hall Road; Port Angeles WA 98362; United States
- Coordinates: 48.1127268°N 123.2556495°W
- Opening: February 16, 2008
- Owner: Dan Abbott – Proprietor; Janet Abbott – Innkeeper

Other information
- Number of suites: 5
- Parking: public parking

Website
- https://www.georgewashingtoninn.com/

George Washington Inn is a bed and breakfast inn located between Sequim and Port Angeles on the Olympic Peninsula in the U.S. state of Washington. It was built as a replica of Mount Vernon, the home of George Washington. The inn opened for business on February 16, 2008. Located near the Olympic National Park, the inn is on a ten-acre waterfront estate and lavender farm in the Sequim Valley at the foot of the Olympic Mountains. The Strait of Juan de Fuca stretches northward from the inn's 130 foot (40 m) high bluff to the city of Victoria, British Columbia and the San Juan Islands. The New Dungeness Light, the Discovery Island Light and the Race Rocks Light are all visible from the inn.

A reproduction of The Washington Family by Edward Savage (artist) hangs above the inn's grand staircase. Also known for its in-house roasted coffee, George Washington Inn has sent packages of its specialty coffee to overseas troops since its beginning. This Port Angeles bed and breakfast inn is a member of the Inns of Excellence, Select Registry, and Diamond Collection and is also listed with several other B&B registries and chambers of commerce.

Along with its lavender farm, known as Washington Lavender Farm, this beautiful estate hosts several summer festivals during the lavender harvest and other public events throughout the year that are open to the public, namely the Washington Lavender Festival, the Northwest Colonial Festival, the Washington Music Festival and the Tour de Lavender. It is also a member of the Sequim Lavender Farmers Association and is a major contributor to agro-tourism in the Sequim Valley. George Washington Inn was registered with the United States Patent and Trademark Office on August 14, 2007.
