= George Washington's Fishery =

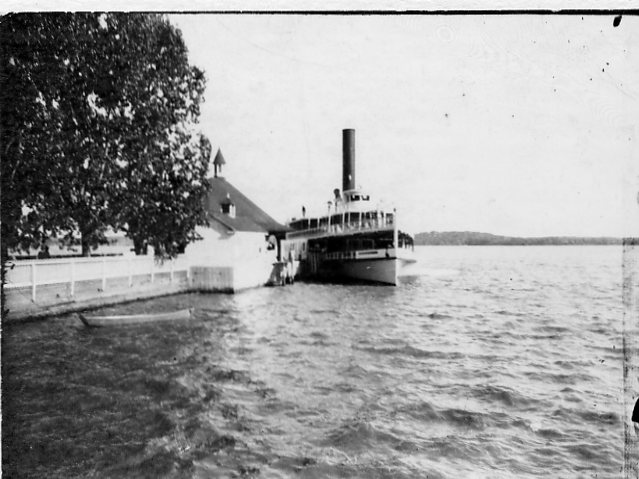
- View of the Mount Vernon wharf area and dock, c. 1930s
- Founded: c. 1765
- Founder: George Washington
- Headquarters: Mount Vernon, Alexandria, Virginia
- Products: Herring, shad, striped bass, catfish, perch, crabs, oysters, clams

George Washington's Fishery, also referred to as the Mount Vernon Fishery, was an active part of the original Mount Vernon plantation, and an early seafood business in Colonial America.

== History ==
George Washington inherited Mount Vernon in 1754. In an effort to diversify his sources of income from the estate due to erosion and other soil problems, Washington had begun small fishing operations by 1765. Washington built and operated a fishing fleet and fishery on multiple sections of the Potomac River including "Posey's Ferry," the wharf, and near Sheridan Point in the River Farm area of the estate. Washington wrote of Mount Vernon that the ten miles of shoreline at his estate were “one entire fishery.”

The fishery was originally intended to help feed the hundreds of slaves who lived on the Mount Vernon plantation, but Washington soon realized that the fishery would also provide a lucrative business opportunity if he began exporting fish and other seafood. The great majority of the work on the fishery was performed by enslaved African Americans. To conduct commercial fishing, Washington ordered seine nets that were twelve feet high and several hundred feet wide. Dropped by two workers in a rowboat, the seine nets formed a barrier that would catch thousands of fish and shellfish, which enslaved workers collected in baskets as the net was pulled onshore.

The fishery was a highly profitable enterprise for Washington. The business caught and harvested close to one million herring annually, in addition to shad, striped bass, catfish, perch, crabs, oysters, and clams. The fishery's herring in particular soon developed an international reputation among buyers for their quality and taste. The fishery often yielded higher profits than other crops raised on Mount Vernon. The business sold seafood locally and regionally, and shipped barrels of salted fish to the West Indies.

The fishery included a small fleet of its own fishing vessels, including a schooner that was built in 1765 by enslaved carpenters, and transported herring and other seafood to various locations, including Antigua. Washington also briefly acquired a brig he called the Farmer which carried fish to destinations including Jamaica and Portugal in the mid-1770s. Prior to the Revolutionary War, Washington's dealings with the British government through his fishery business left him with a negative impression due to imperial trade policies that forbade him from importing his desired fish-curing salts from Portugal.

During his presidency from 1789 to 1797, Washington was not heavily involved in his fishery business, but he did direct the manager of his fishery business, William Pearce, to sell surplus seafood and was involved in the sale of fish and pricing negotiations with merchants. In 1793, Washington wrote that the banks of the Potomac River were "well-stocked with various kinds of fish in all seasons of the year, and in the Spring with shad, herring, bass, carp, perch, sturgeon, etc., in great abundance."

== See also ==
- Mount Vernon
- George Washington's Gristmill
- George Washington's whiskey distillery
