= American Whiskey Trail =

Alcohol promotion program in the US

The American Whiskey Trail is the name of a promotional program supported by the Distilled Spirits Council of the United States that promotes the distilled beverage industry in the U.S. The Trail was first promoted to the public on September 28, 2004.

== Overview ==
The trail was created in 2004 by the Distilled Spirits Council of the United States. It is not a linear route, but circles through various points of interest such as historic bars, museums, coopers, and still-makers, with whiskey distilleries being the main focus.

== Key historical sites along the trail ==
American Whiskey Trail – Non-Distillery Historic Sites
1 Fraunces Tavern
2 Allegany Museum
3 Gadsby's Tavern
4 Oliver Miller Homestead
5 Oscar Getz Museum of Whiskey History
6 West Overton Village
7 Woodville Plantation

The American Whiskey Trail consists of various historical sites – some with operating distilleries – that are open to the public for tours. Sites along the American Whiskey Trail can be visited in any order or sequence desired, although the George Washington Distillery is promoted as the "gateway" to the trail and is a common starting point.

As of 2024, the trail map includes eleven distilleries and seven historical sites.

Non-distillery historical sites include Fraunces Tavern Museum in Manhattan, New York, Gadsby's Tavern Museum in Alexandria, Virginia, the Oliver Miller Homestead in South Park, Pennsylvania, the Oscar Getz Museum of Whiskey History in Bardstown, Kentucky, the West Overton Village & Museums in Scottdale, Pennsylvania, Woodville Plantation (John and Presley Neville House) in Bridgeville, Pennsylvania and Allegany Museum in Cumberland, Maryland.

Besides recognized historic sites, a number of operating whiskey distilleries are open to the public for tours and, in many cases, tastings. Most are located in close proximity to each other in Kentucky, although a few are located in Tennessee, Pennsylvania, Utah, and West Virginia.

== Distilleries on the trail ==
American Whiskey Trail – Distilleries
1 George Washington Distillery
2 Angel’s Envy Distillery
3 Stitzel-Weller
4 George Dickel Distillery
5 High West Distillery
6 Jack Daniel's Distillery
7 Jim Beam American Stillhouse
8 Maker's Mark Distillery
9 Smooth Ambler Distillery
10 Wild Turkey Distillery
11 Woodford Reserve Distillery

Distillery sites include Angel's Envy Distillery, Stitzel-Weller, George Dickel Distillery, High West Distillery, Jack Daniel's Distillery, Jim Beam American Stillhouse, Jim Beam Urban Stillhouse, Maker's Mark Distillery, Smooth Ambler Distillery, Wild Turkey Distillery.

In addition to sites and distilleries tied to the history of American whiskey production, the Distilled Spirits Council provides information and promotes a range of other distilleries around the country in conjunction with promotion of the American Whiskey Trail. The list includes two key rum distilleries – Bacardi in Catano, Puerto Rico, and Cruzan in St. Croix, U.S. Virgin Islands – along with various small distilleries. Examples include Golden Moon Distillery, a gin and liqueur producer in Colorado; Koloa Rum Company, a rum producer in Hawaii; Limestone Branch Distillery, a whiskey producer in Kentucky; Black Button Distilling, a whiskey and gin producer in New York; and Tenn South Distillery and Nelson's Green Brier Distillery, two whiskey producers in Tennessee.

== See also ==
- American whiskey
- Kentucky Bourbon Trail
