= George Washington's Gristmill =

- George Washington’s Distillery and Gristmill
- U.S. National Register of Historic Places
- Virginia Landmarks Register
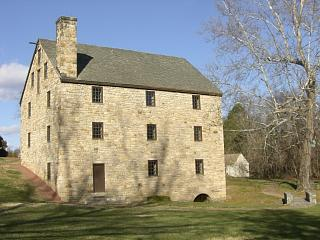
- Reconstruction of Washington’s Gristmill

- Location within Northern Virginia Location within Virginia Location within the United States
- Location: 5512 Mount Vernon Memorial Hwy., Lorton, Virginia, USA
- Coordinates: 38°42′46″N 77°07′51″W
- Area: 6.7 acres (2.7 ha)
- Built: 1770; reconstructed in 1933
- Architect: Burson, R.E. (1933 reconstruction)
- Architectural style: Colonial Revival
- NRHP reference No.: 03000739
- VLR No.: 029-0330

Significant dates
- Added to NRHP: August 8, 2003
- Designated VLR: March 19, 2003

George Washington's Gristmill was part of the original Mount Vernon plantation, constructed during the lifetime of the United States' first president. The original structure was destroyed about 1850. The Commonwealth of Virginia and the Mount Vernon Ladies’ Association have reconstructed the gristmill and the adjacent distillery. The reconstructed buildings are located at their original site three miles (4.8 km) west of the Mount Vernon mansion near Woodlawn Plantation in the Mount Vernon area of Fairfax County. Because the reconstructed buildings embody the distinctive characteristics of late eighteenth century methods of production and are of importance to the history of Virginia, the site is listed on the National Register of Historic Places despite the fact that the buildings are not original.

== History ==
George Washington inherited the slave plantation of Mount Vernon in 1754, and in 1771 he ordered the construction of a large stone gristmill to replace a mill his father Augustine had built in the 1730s. The new mill was located three miles (5 km) west of Mount Vernon on Dogue Run Creek. Operated with hired and enslaved millers, the mill produced flour and cornmeal for the plantation, the latter for its slaves. The high-quality flour produced by the mill was exported to the West Indies and Europe. Washington also ordered a house to be built for a miller and cooper to supply barrels for the mill, and later, the distillery operation. The mill was powered by a large water wheel, and to ensure a steady power supply water was diverted from Piney Branch into Dogue Run Creek above the mill's headrace. The additional waterflow significantly increased the mill's production capacity. In 1791, Washington automated his mill using technology developed and patented by Oliver Evans of Delaware. Evans was personally acquainted with the mill and had repaired some of its works.

Once the gristmill was well established, Washington's farm manager, James Anderson, suggested building a whiskey distillery adjacent to the mill. When it was completed in 1797, the distillery was the largest in America. By 1799 it had become one of Washington's most successful enterprises, producing 11,000 gallons of whiskey per year. A variety of whiskeys were produced at the site along with brandy and vinegar. The most common whiskey recipe used 60% rye, 35% corn, and 5% malted barley. Smaller amounts of rye whiskey were distilled up to four times and were more expensive. Some whiskey was also flavored with cinnamon. When rye was scarce the distillery used wheat. Apple, peach and persimmon brandies were also produced. The whiskey was marketed in Alexandria, Virginia, or shipped directly from Mount Vernon's dock on the Potomac River. The distillery process produced a significant waste stream, which was fed to 150 cattle and 30 hogs that were kept at the site.

After Washington's death in December 1799, the gristmill and distillery passed to his nephew, Lawrence Lewis. In 1808, he rented the site to Alexandria merchant James Douglass. The last known reference to the distillery business is an 1808 whiskey advertisement. The distillery building burned in 1814; this is documented by a small insurance payment made to Lewis that year. In 1848, Lewis’ grandson sold the gristmill property along with Woodlawn Plantation. That is the last record of the original buildings. Local oral history suggests that the mill was quite run-down by 1848, and it was razed around 1850.

== Reconstruction ==
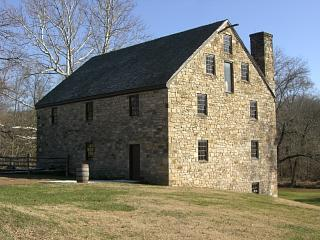
Reconstruction of George Washington's 1771 gristmill

In 1932, the Commonwealth of Virginia purchased 6.65 acres (26,900 m^{2}) around the old mill site. The state initiated an archaeological field survey of the site with the goal of reconstructing the gristmill, distillery and other Washington-era buildings. The gristmill and miller's house were reconstructed in 1933. Shortly after their completion, the site was opened as a state park. However, by 1936 the state had stopped maintaining the park. Sometime around 1940 a local chapter of the Future Farmers of America began caring for the grounds, but public use of the park was sparse. The state resumed responsibility for the park in 1962. Over the next two decades, several additional structures were built on the site.

In 1997, Virginia conveyed the property to the Mount Vernon Ladies' Association which owns and operates the Mount Vernon estate. From 1997 to 2002 the main structures underwent major renovation, including rebuilding the internal millworkings, renovation of the miller's house, restoration of the millraces, and construction of new brick pathways throughout the site. Because the property embodies the distinctive characteristics of late eighteenth-century production methods, the site was listed on the National Register of Historic Places in 2003. In 1999, archaeologists began to investigate the distillery site; after five years of study the distillery reconstruction began. It was completed and opened to the public in 2007. This $2.1 million project was funded by the Distilled Spirits Council of the United States and the Wine and Spirits Wholesalers of America.

== Historic site ==
George Washington's Gristmill is located on 6.65 acres (2.69 ha) approximately three miles west of the Mount Vernon estate. It is situated on an eastward sloping lot, bounded by Dogue Run Creek to the south, pasture land belonging to the National Trust for Historic Preservation to the west, the park's paved parking lot and a housing subdivision to the north, and a wooded lot to the east. The property is bisected by Virginia Route 235. All the site's historic elements (except one archeological site) are located on the east side of the highway. This includes the gristmill, distillery, miller's house and several archeological sites. The west side of the property contains one archaeological site and three non-contributing structures.

== Gristmill ==
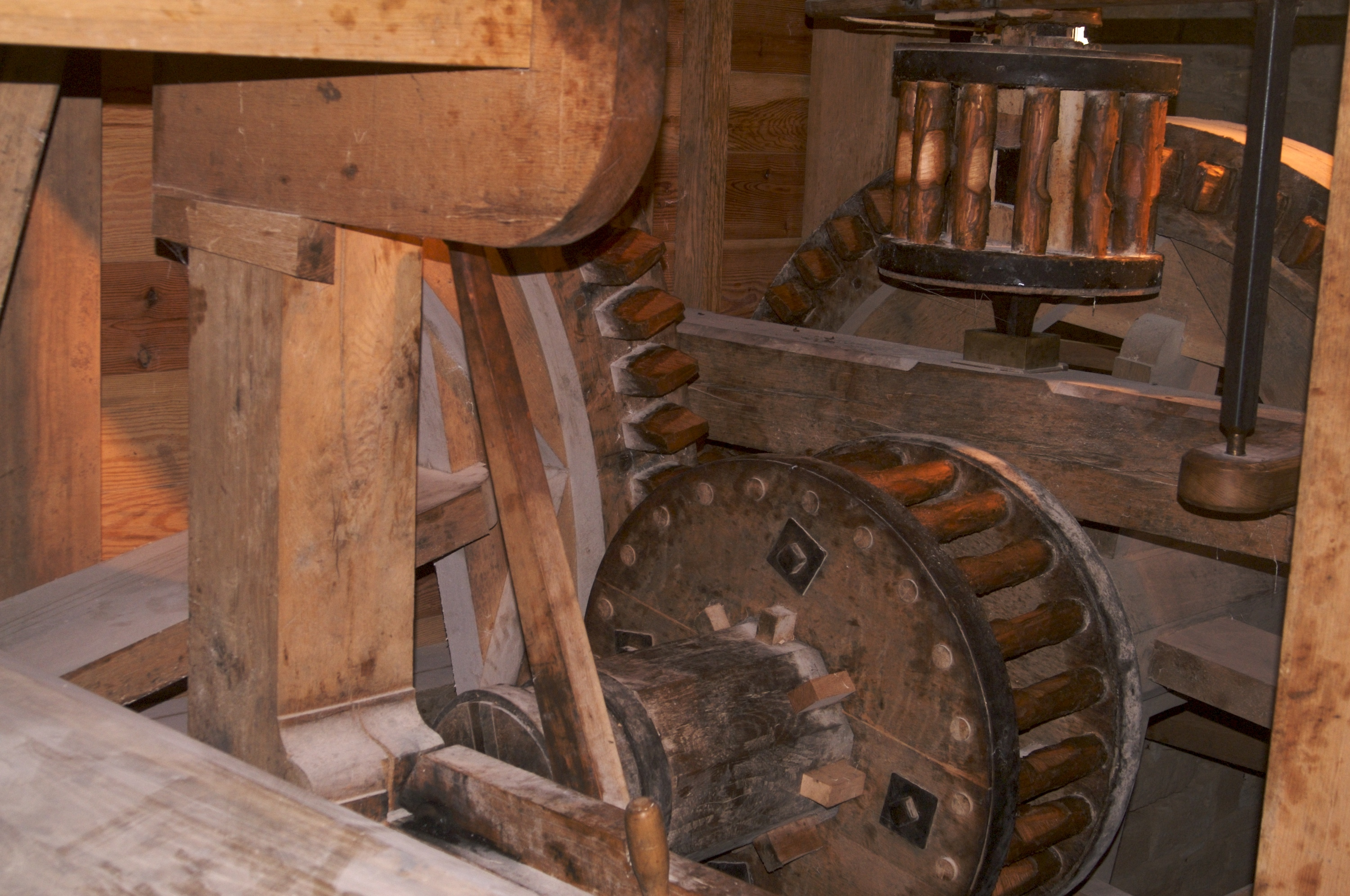
The internal millworkings are enclosed in a heavy oak frame.

The gristmill is a Colonial Revival-style stone building that was constructed in 1933 based on archaeological and documentary evidence. Its rectangular footprint measures 37 feet (11 m) by 50 feet (15 m). Its foundation is built into a hillside, with two and one half stories above ground on the north side and three and one half stories on the south side. It is a masonry structure built with sandstone arranged in a random pattern with stone lintels and sills. The mill's roof is covered with wooden shingles. On the south side of the building is a vertical-board door on the first floor; there is an identical door on the ground floor on the north side as well. Both have stone landings. The millrace enters the mill on the north side and exits at ground level on the south side.

The internal millworkings and structural members installed during the 1933 reconstruction were taken from an 1818 gristmill located near Front Royal, Virginia. Some of the structural members from Front Royal mill are still in the building; however, most of the millworkings were replaced between 1997 and 2002. The interior has exposed masonry walls with heavy timber framing. The flooring throughout the building is random-width pine. A masonry fireplace is in the southwest corner of the first floor. The grinding platform is accessed from the second floor. The third level is one large room with rolling screens and other processing equipment. A staircase in the western half of the structure runs from the first floor to attic. The mill's two grinding stones are powered by a pitch-back water wheel. The mill machinery is enclosed in a hurst frame, built from heavy oak and pine beams. Its frame is built directly on the mill's foundation, and is not connected to the walls. This protects the structure from the machinery's potentially damaging vibrations. The hurst frame occupies the eastern half of the first two levels.

== Miller’s house ==
The miller's house was built at the same time as the gristmill; the reconstructed house was sited on its original site. The design for the building is based on archaeological evidence and a mid-nineteenth-century drawing. Its wood-frame structure rests on a stone foundation. It is clad with beaded weatherboard. In 1970, a 1 1/2-story addition doubled the size of the building. The interior of the original section is laid out in a hall-parlor configuration with two major rooms and a small bathroom. This area is used as a gift shop. The new section of the house includes a kitchen, pantry, and additional retail space for the gift ship.

== Distillery ==
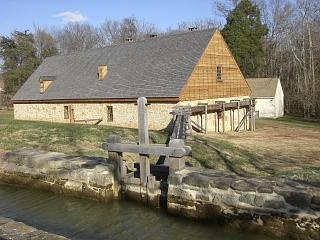
Reconstruction of George Washington's 1797 distillery

Because there is no surviving example of eighteenth century distillery, the reconstruction of Washington's distillery required extensive archeological and documentary investigation before an authentic structure could be built. The archeological study began in 1997 and lasted until 2006. During the excavation archaeologists uncovered the distillery's stone foundation which is some thirty-six inches (900 mm) thick. Some of the original foundation stones are over twenty-four inches (600 mm) in diameter. The initial course of the sandstone superstructure was intact along the southern foundation, and was two feet (600 mm) thick. They discovered the location of five stills and boilers, and found many objects used in the distilling process along with fragments of domestic items such as teacups, drinking glasses and buttons.

The distillery was reconstructed in 2007. To ensure an authentic reconstruction the wood was finished by hand and the construction used hand-made nails and hardware. There were some compromises necessary to comply with modern building codes and safety requirements. For example, the original structure's 30 by 75 foot (9 m by 23 m) footprint was extended by 15 feet (4.6 m) in order to house an elevator and modern staircase for public use.

The distillery has two floors with five large copper stills, mash tubs and a boiler that demonstrate the eighteenth-century distilling process. The building includes a storage cellar for whiskey barrels, an office, and two bedrooms where the site manager and his assistant would have lived. The building's floors are made of three different materials. A stone floor is used in the mashing area to reduce vibrations that can disturb the fermentation process. Around the boilers and under the staircase is a brick floor, and an elevated wooden floor around the stills. Wooden planks are used for flooring in the rest of the building.

The original distillery was built to specifications provided by James Anderson, originally from Inverkeithing in Scotland and much of the correspondence between Washington and Anderson is recorded in the Library of Congress. The concept of building a distillery and entering into whisky production was suggested directly by Anderson and Washington's skepticism was notable in many letters. In the end, on advice from friends, he agreed to proceed with the plans as outlined by Anderson. The process is based on the Scottish distillation of Scotch Whisky but differs in that the spirit was not aged as Scotch is today. As a result, the Whisky tastes quite different.

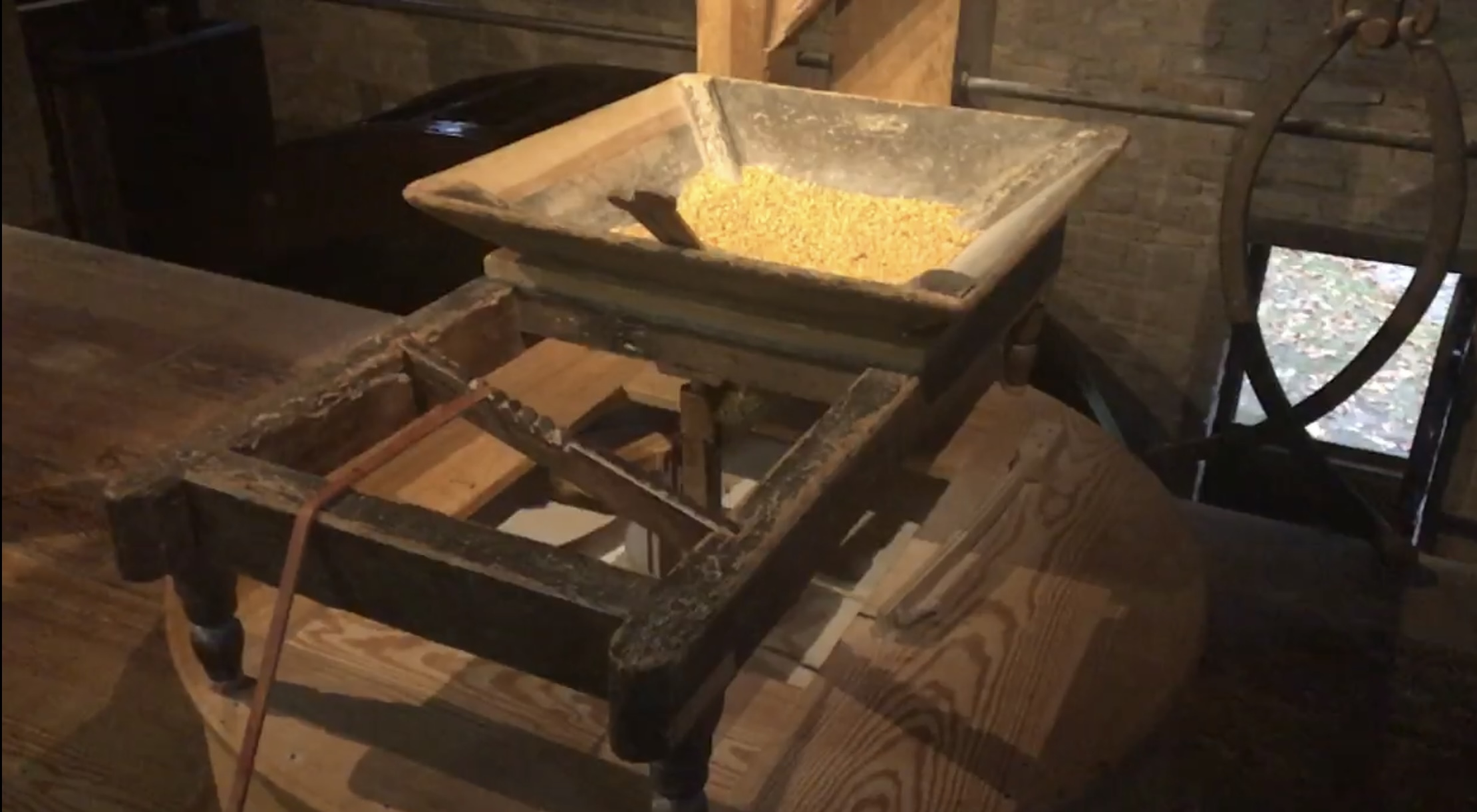
Gristmill in action, interior. Use of cornmeal in place of Barley is noted.

== Access ==
The gristmill, distillery, and gift shop are open to the public from April through October. They are located approximately three miles west of Mount Vernon's main gate on Virginia Route 235. Tickets to tour the gristmill and distillery are available at Mount Vernon and the gristmill's gift shop. The tickets can be combined admission to Mount Vernon or purchased separately. Public transportation is available between Mount Vernon and the gristmill.

== See also ==
- List of historic whisky distilleries
- George Washington's Fishery
