= John Thornton Augustine Washington =

American politician

Member of the House of Delegates for Jefferson County
- In office November 29, 1824 – December 4, 1825 Serving with Daniel Morgan
- Preceded by: Braxton Davenport
- Succeeded by: Carver Willis

Personal details
- Born: May 20, 1783 Berry's Hill near Charles Town, Virginia (now West Virginia)
- Died: October 9, 1841 (aged 58) Cedar Lawn near Charles Town, Virginia (now West Virginia)
- Citizenship: United States
- Spouse: Elizabeth Conrad Bedinger
- Relations: grandnephew of George Washington
- Children: 13, including: Lawrence Berry Washington; Benjamin Franklin Washington
- Parent(s): Thornton Augustine Washington; Mildred Berry
- Occupation: farmer, soldier, and politician

John Thornton Augustine Washington (May 20, 1783 – October 9, 1841) was a prominent Virginia (now West Virginia) farmer who served a term in the Virginia House of Delegates. Washington was a grandnephew of George Washington, first President of the United States.

== Early life and family ==
John Thornton Augustine Washington was born on May 20, 1783, at Berry's Hill plantation near Charles Town, Virginia (now West Virginia). He was the eldest son of Thornton Augustine Washington (1760–1787) and his first wife Mildred Berry Washington (1760–1785). Washington had one younger brother, Thomas Berry Washington, from his father's marriage to Mildred Berry Washington. His mother died in 1785 and Washington's father married Frances Townsend Washington around 1786. From this marriage, Washington had a younger half-brother, Samuel Washington. Through his father, Washington was a grandson of Samuel Washington (1734–1781), and a grandnephew of Charles Washington (1738–1799) and United States President George Washington (1732–1799).

Orphaned as a child (his father died in 1787), J. T. A. Washington was raised by his guardian and maternal uncle Lawrence Berry at his Berry Plain plantation. Washington was educated at Bowling Green Academy. He remained at Berry Plain until he was of a "sufficient age" to take control of Berry's Hill plantation, which he inherited from his father.

== Soldier and politician ==
Unlike other prominent members of the Washington family, John Washington was not fond of public life. According to his son, Washington had a preference for "the quiet and congenial occupation of a country gentleman." During the War of 1812, Washington was offered the rank of captain and the command of a company of cavalry in the United States Army, but turned down the offer in order to participate in the fighting as a private.

In 1824, Jefferson County voters elected Washington as one of their representatives in the Virginia House of Delegates, but he declined to run for a second term. Washington later was urged to run for Sheriff, but he refused.

== Planter ==
Washington inherited Berry's Hill plantation from his father, and operated it using enslaved labor. In the 1810 census, he owned 31 slaves in Jefferson County, and two decades earlier he owned 37 slaves.

In 1825, Washington built the present Federal-style brick dwelling on the property, which he renamed Cedar Lawn. In addition to his Cedar Lawn estate, Washington owned lands along Bullskin Run, a small tributary stream of the Shenandoah River, near Cedar Lawn, and along the Kanawha River in Mason County.

== Marriage and children ==
On September 2, 1810, at Shepherdstown, Washington married Elizabeth Conrad Bedinger, the daughter of Daniel Bedinger and Sarah Rutherford Bedinger. Elizabeth's father was an officer in the American Revolutionary War and her maternal grandfather Robert Rutherford was a member of the United States House of Representatives representing the lower Shenandoah Valley of Virginia. Her brother, Henry Bedinger III, was also a member of the U.S. House of Representatives and later served as Chargé d'Affaires and Minister to Denmark for United States President Franklin Pierce.

Washington and his wife Elizabeth produced a large family including five sons and eight daughters:

- Lawrence Berry Washington (November 26, 1811 – September 21, 1856)
- Daniel Bedinger Washington (born February 8, 1814)

∞ first cousin Lucy A. Washington Wharton, October 24, 1843 at Harper's Ferry, Virginia (now West Virginia)

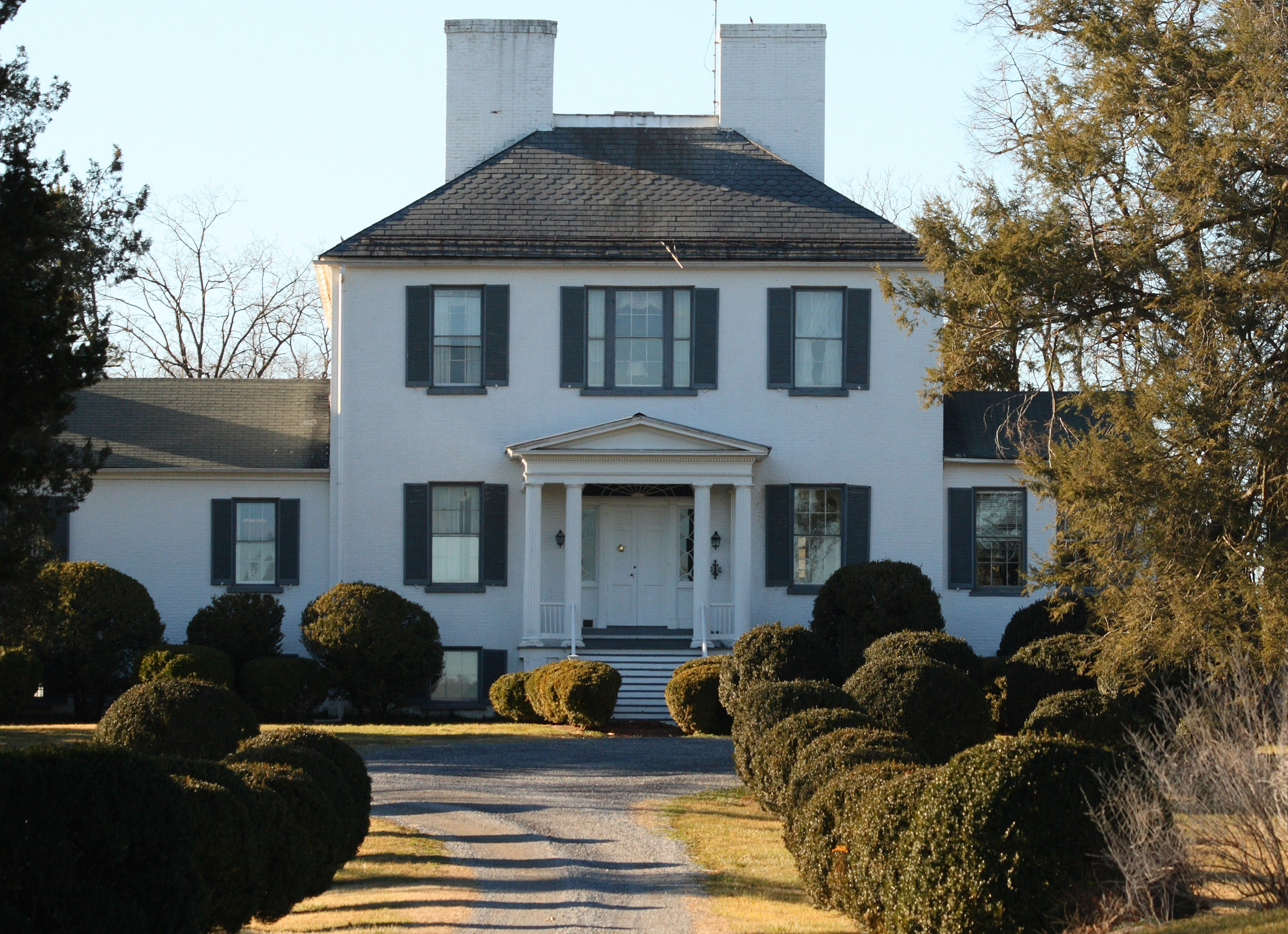
Cedar Lawn, built by John Thornton Augustine Washington in 1825.

- Virginia Thornton Washington (March 2, 1816 – November 13, 1838), died unmarried
- Sally Eleanor Washington (April 7, 1818 – January 21, 1858), died unmarried
- Benjamin Franklin Washington (April 7, 1820 – January 22, 1872)

∞ Georgianna Hite Ransom, October 22, 1845 at Charles Town

- Georgiana Augusta Washington Smith (born March 13, 1822)

∞ John Wheeler Smith, November 20, 1851 at Cedar Lawn

- Mary Elizabeth Washington Asbury (born March 4, 1824)

∞ Squire Asbury (grand-nephew of U.S. President Zachary Taylor), September 21, 1858 in Johnson County, Missouri

- Col. John Thornton Augustine Washington (January 22, 1826 – July 10, 1894)

∞ Olive Anne Jones, March 8, 1860 at San Antonio, Texas

- Mildred Berry Washington (September 3, 1827 – September 12, 1827)
- Mildred Berry Washington Bedinger (March 8, 1829 – November 7, 1871)

∞ Solomon Singleton Bedinger, February 8, 1854 at Cedar Lawn

- Hon. George Washington (born December 9, 1830)

∞ Mary Virginia Dempsey, April 11, 1871 at Otterville, Missouri

- Susan Ellsworth Washington Bedinger (born April 1, 1833)

∞ Henry Clay Bedinger, May 22, 1857 in Johnson County, Missouri

- Henrietta Gray Washington (September 30, 1835 – December 18, 1838)

== Later life ==
Washington's wife Elizabeth died on October 21, 1837, at Cedar Lawn and Washington himself died at Cedar Lawn four years later on October 9, 1841. Washington's children had departed the homestead for other areas or moved to nearby estates by the time of his death, and the Cedar Lawn property passed from the Washington family. Washington had finished drafting his will on July 16, 1840, and it was proved nine days after his death in Charles Town on October 18, 1841. Washington and his wife were interred at Harewood, the estate formerly owned by his grandfather Colonel Samuel Washington and from which Cedar Lawn was created. The family bible acquired by Washington on September 1, 1818, in which he inscribed a record of the dates and locations of his family's births, deaths, and weddings was passed down through his descendants and is currently in the possession of the Bedinger family.

== Theoretical American royal succession ==
According to a May 1908 article in The Scrap Book entitled "If Washington Had Been Crowned" and a February 1951 article in Life entitled "If Washington Had Become King: A Carpenter or an Engineer Might Now Rule the U.S.," John Thornton Augustine Washington would have likely succeeded his great uncle George Washington as "king" of the United States had Washington accepted the position of monarch rather than that of president. Following the laws of male preference primogeniture succession recognized by the Kingdom of Great Britain at the time of American independence, John Thornton Augustine Washington would have been the lawful heir presumptive to Washington as the eldest son of Thornton Washington, who in turn was the eldest son of Samuel Washington, Washington's eldest full brother. A theoretical "King John I of the United States" would have had a lengthy reign spanning from Washington's death in 1799 until 1841.

== Ancestry ==
Ancestors of John Thornton Augustine Washington

16. Lawrence Washington
8. Augustine Washington
17. Mildred Warner
4. Samuel Washington
18. Joseph Ball
9. Mary Ball
19. Mary Montague
2. Thornton Augustine Washington
10. Francis Thornton
5. Mildred Thornton
11. Frances Gregory
1. John Thornton Augustine Washington
24. William Berry
12. Enoch Berry, Sr.
25. Margaret Doughty
6. Thomas Berry
26. William Bunbury
13. Dulcebella Bunbury
27. Frances Mason
3. Mildred Berry
28. John Washington
14. John Washington
29. Mary Townsend
7. Elizabeth Corn Washington
30. Dade Massey
15. Mary Massey
31. Elizabeth Ellis

== Bibliography ==
- Bacon, E.L. (May 1908), If Washington Had Been Crowned, The Scrap Book magazine, Frank A. Munsey Company
- Cooper County, Missouri Genealogical Web Project. "John Thornton Augustine Washington Family Bible Transcription" (PDF). The USGenWeb Project. Archived from the original (PDF) on December 20, 2018.
- Harrison, Bruce (2005). The Family Forest Descendants of Lady Joan Beaufort. Millisecond Publishing Company, Inc.
- McGee, Ted (1973). National Register of Historic Places – Nomination Form: Cedar Lawn (PDF). United States Department of the Interior, National Park Service. Archived from the original (PDF) on December 20, 2018 – via West Virginia Division of Culture and History.
- von Frank zu Döfering, Karl Friedrich; Marye, William Bose; Slagle, Alexander Russell (1967). The Slagle Family in America: Descended from the Schlegel von Gottleben Family of Germany.
- Wallace, Robert (February 19, 1951). "If Washington Had Become King: A Carpenter or an Engineer Might Now Rule the U.S." Life. Vol. 30, no. 8. New York City: Time Inc. pp. 107–114. ISSN 0024-3019 – via Google Books.
- Washington, Thornton Augustin (1891). A Genealogical History, Beginning with Colonel John Washington, the Emigrant, and Head of the Washington Family in America. Washington, D.C.: Press of McGill & Wallace. OCLC 969389709 – via Internet Archive.
- Wayland, John Walter (1998). The Washingtons and Their Homes. Baltimore: Genealogical Publishing Co. ISBN 978-0-8063-4775-2. OCLC 1004873451 – via Google Books.
