= Benjamin Franklin Washington =

American journalist (1820–1872)

- Born: April 7, 1820 near Charles Town, Virginia (now West Virginia)
- Died: January 22, 1872 (aged 51); San Francisco, California
- Occupation: American newspaper editor
- Spouse: Georgianna Hite Ransom (1845–1872, his death)
- Parent(s): John Thornton Augustine Washington; Elizabeth Conrad Bedinger
- Relatives: Samuel Washington (great-grandfather); George Washington (great-granduncle)

Benjamin Franklin Washington (April 7, 1820 – January 22, 1872) was a relative of George Washington. He was involved in a duel with C. A. Washburn over articles printed in the San Francisco Herald.

== Personal life ==
Washington was born on April 7, 1820, at "Berry Hill" afterward, "Cedar Lawn" plantation near Charles Town, Virginia (now West Virginia) and was the fifth child and third son of John Thornton Augustine Washington and his wife Elizabeth Conrad Bedinger. Washington's great-grandfather, Samuel Washington, was a younger brother of George Washington.

Washington married Georgianna Hite Ransom on October 22, 1845, in Jefferson County, Virginia (now West Virginia). He studied law but went west to California in the 1849 Gold Rush as the president of the Charlestown Company.

He was coeditor of the Sacramento Democratic State Journal, along with Vincent Geiger.

On October 7, 1863, the Democratic Press was established in San Francisco, and by June 12, 1865, it became the Evening Examiner, with William S. Moss as publisher and B.F. Washington as editor. For several years William S. Moss, Phil Roach and George Pen Johnston were its owners. Until it was bought by Senator Hearst in the 1880s, the paper had been a "highly chaste and non-sensation journal". After Senator Hearst's death the paper went to his son, William R. Hearst.

B.F. Washington died January 22, 1872, in San Francisco, California. His granddaughter Frances W. Delehanty was an artist, illustrator, and founder of an abbey in Connecticut.

== The duel ==
Washington, who at the time worked for the Times and Transcript, took offense at articles written in the San Francisco Herald. As a result, he challenged C. A. Washburn, then the editor of the San Francisco Herald, to a duel. Though Washington aimed to kill, his second shot went through the rim of Washburn's hat, and his third bullet struck Washburn in the shoulder. The duel then ended.
