= Lawrence Augustine Washington =

Nephew of George Washington

- Born: April 11, 1774
- Died: February 15, 1824 (aged 50); Harewood Plantation, Berkeley County, Virginia (now Jefferson County, West Virginia)
- Spouse: Mary Dorcas Wood
- Family: Washington family

Lawrence Augustine Washington (April 11, 1774 – February 15, 1824) was a nephew of United States President George Washington and son of Samuel Washington and his fourth wife, Anne Steptoe.

== Early life ==
Lawrence was born at Harewood in what is now Jefferson County, West Virginia in 1774. After his father's death, he, along with his brother George Steptoe and sister Harriot, went to live with their uncle George Washington for a time. The future president paid for him and his brother to be educated at Georgetown academy, where according to historian Ron Chernow, "they were wild and uncontrollable and a constant trial to Washington". Lawrence Augustine married Mary Dorcas Wood on November 6, 1797, in Winchester, Virginia. Together, the couple had four children. It is through his son, Dr. Lawrence Augustine Washington, that a direct Washington family lineage exists today.

== Children ==
1. George Samuel Washington
2. Emma Tell Washington (1812–1838)
3. Lawrence Augustine Washington (1813–1882)
4. Mary Dorcas Washington (1817–1861)

== See also ==
- List of George Washington articles
