= Claymont Court =

Historic house in West Virginia, United States

- Claymont
- U.S. National Register of Historic Places
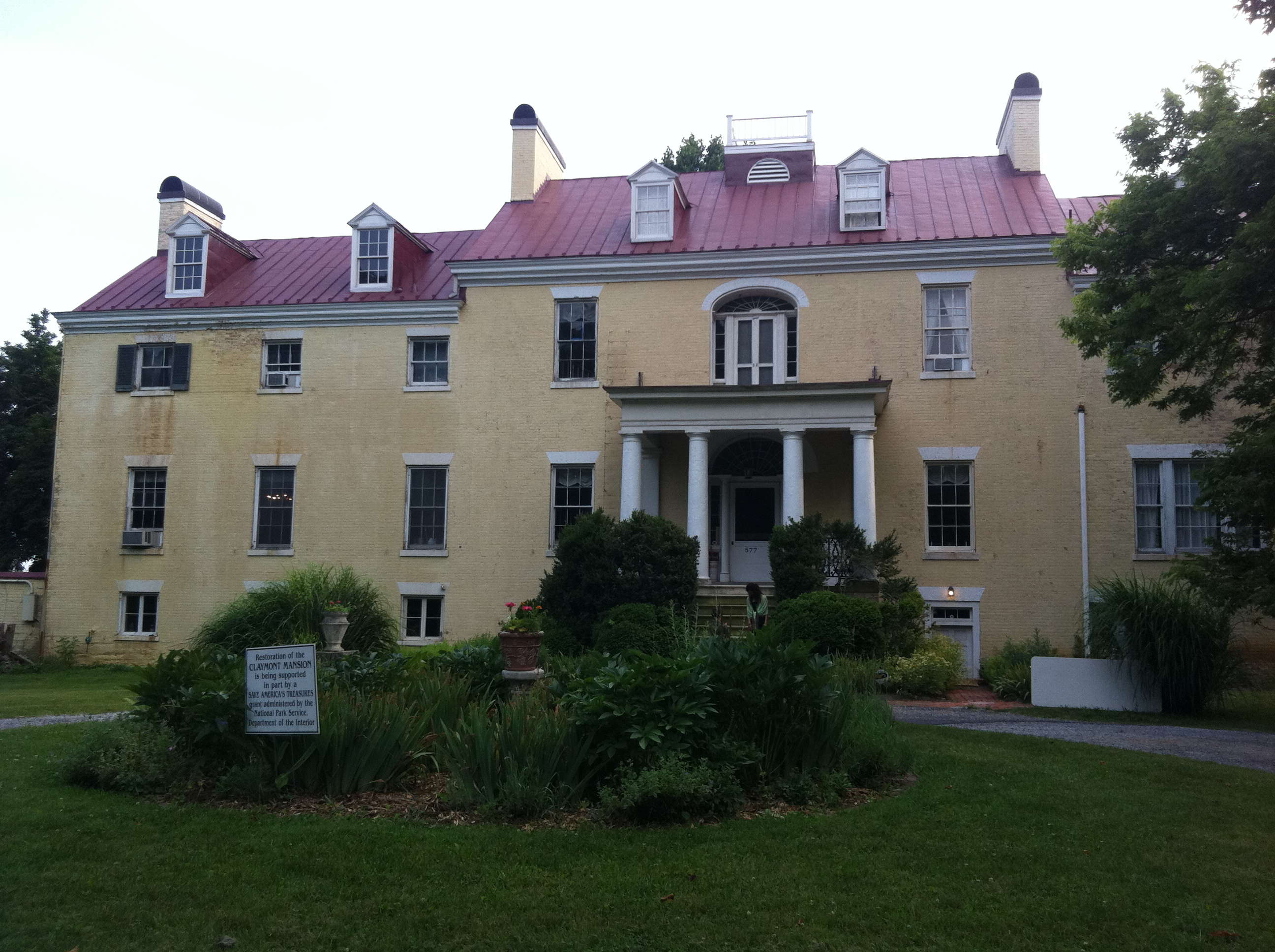
- Front entrance to Claymont Court

- Location within West Virginia Location within the United States
- Nearest city: Charles Town, West Virginia
- Coordinates: 39°16′2″N 77°54′14″W
- Built: 1840
- Architectural style: Georgian
- NRHP reference No.: 73001908
- Added to NRHP: July 25, 1973

Claymont Court, or simply Claymont, is a Georgian-style brick mansion, the grandest of several built near Charles Town, West Virginia for members of the Washington family. The current "Big House" was built in 1840 for Bushrod Corbin Washington, nephew of Supreme Court justice Bushrod Washington and grand-nephew of George Washington, to replace the 1820 main house on his plantation that burned in 1838.

In 1899 author Frank Stockton purchased the house and lived there until he died in 1902. In 1943, Claymont was bought by West Virginia industrialist Robert Joseph Funkhouser, who at the same time bought the adjacent Blakeley and Cedar Lawn, other Washington descendant houses and large properties. He combined the properties into a 7,000-acre (28 km^{2}) estate.

In 1974 John G. Bennett purchased Claymont to create an intentional community. It is currently used as a retreat center by the Claymont Society for Continuous Education.

== Washington Family era ==
In the 1700s, the 300-acre (1.2 km^{2}) plot of land on which Claymont stands was owned by John Augustine Washington, the brother of George Washington. With the labor of enslaved people under his control, George Washington developed the Bullskin Plantation, the first property he ever owned, a few miles southwest of the Claymont property.

In 1811, George Washington's grand-nephew Bushrod Corbin Washington inherited the land, having reached the legal age of 21, and about a decade later had 90 enslaved people build a thirty-four room mansion there. At about the same time, his slightly older brother, John Augustine Washington III, built the Blakeley mansion about 600 yards away and facing Claymont. The two brothers married daughters from the Blackburn family and raised their own families directly across from each other in the Blakeley and Claymont mansions.

Bushrod finished building Claymont in 1820 for $30,000 (~$924,914 in 2024), a massive sum at the time. The house became known as "Bushrod's folly." At completion, it was the largest house in the area, and with later additions would become the largest house in West Virginia at 16,000 square feet (1,500 m^{2}) with 59 rooms and 25 fireplaces. Claymont may also be the northernmost example of the Virginia Plantation Style mansion; it had wings, courtyards, and dependencies. Claymont burned down in 1838. Bushrod had recently departed for Richmond, where he was serving his first week as an assemblyman in the Virginia House of Delegates. The fire is believed to have started in the fireplace of the mansion's basement kitchen.

The central part of the mansion was completely rebuilt in 1840, and the remainder restored. Bushrod died in 1851, leaving Claymont to his son Thomas Blackburn Washington. Thomas died in 1854, leaving the estate to his eldest son Bushrod Corbin Washington II.

The Civil War was devastating to the Washington family, many of whom fought for the Confederacy, and others took refuge at Claymont. During the war, Bushrod C. Washington enlisted in the 2nd Virginia Infantry and then the 12th Virginia Cavalry, both Confederate States Army units, and ended the war hospitalized in Charlottesville (though upon release he signed the required oath in Winchester and received a federal pardon in 1866). His younger brothers Sgt. George Washington died in battle in 1863, and his youngest brother James Cunningham Washington fought less formally under John Singleton Mosby, and was captured after conducting raids north into Kentucky and Ohio, and died in a Baltimore prison in 1865.

Both of the young men were captured in Claymont Court during Christmas furlough (holiday leave) by Union Army troops led by George Custer. As an example of the close history among some officers, he had been a roommate of one of the Washington men when they were both cadets at West Point military academy. The camps were rife with disease due to overcrowding and poor sanitation; people did not know how to handle these conditions. As punishment to Claymont estate for "harboring guerrillas", General Sheridan ordered all of the cattle driven off the land (except for one milch cow) and every fence surrounding the estate's Clay Mound farm burned down.

After the Civil War, the reconstructionist government demanded payment of back taxes for all of the years that the Washington family had paid taxes to the Confederacy rather than the Union. Like many other families, the Washington family were short on cash, struggling with agricultural decline, and could not pay the taxes. By 1871 the family was forced to sell Claymont estate for the modest sum of $10,000 (~$232,801 in 2024) (a third of what it cost to build). Most of the family moved to the Pacific Northwest and the territory of Washington, which was not admitted as a state until 1889.

After the Washingtons vacated Claymont, the property changed hands a number of times. As the mansion and larger estate was unoccupied for a few years at a time, the property began to deteriorate due to reduced maintenance, and the farming operations halted. Claymont operated as a self-sustaining farm, differing from plantations in the deeper American South, which had been based on producing commodity crops. Claymont produced almost everything the inhabitants used. Before the Civil War, the owners held nearly one hundred enslaved people as well as a couple dozen free workers to accomplish all the work.

Because of Claymont's size, it was an expensive operation to keep up. The transition to the use of free labor, especially during decades of continuing decline in the agricultural market, made it difficult for owners to make enough revenue to keep the estate operational.

== Owners after the Washington Family ==
After the Washingtons sold the property, there were a number of successive owners of Claymont:

- 1871-1886: Clement March
- 1886-1889: Charles Dawson

Dawson hired William A. Bates, an architect from New York City to redesign the mansion, enlarging it significantly. Both the ballroom wing and the dining room wings were enlarged to their current size of 32x36 feet. A second story was added to both wings, which included bedrooms and bathrooms.

- 1889-1906: Frank R. Stockton

Stockton was a popular author at the time and wrote three books while residing at Claymont. He is best known for his short story "The Lady, or the Tiger?".

- 1906-1943: Col. S.J. Murphy

Murphy rebuilt and refined Claymont's old gardens with the help of Conklyn Brothers Landscape Architects and Hydraulic Engineers of Charles Town, West Virginia. He added a 235-foot (72 m) pergola and large fountain to the gardens, among other changes.

- 1943-1972: R.J. (Raymond Joseph) Funkhouser (1885–1965)

Funkhouser was a prominent West Virginia industrialist who owned or controlled 18 companies, including numerous businesses and manufacturing concerns in the state. He retired at 50, and purchased and restored several old Washington homes of Jefferson County. He bought Cedar Lawn, Blakeley, and Claymont and combined them into one 7,000-acre (28 km^{2}) property (the estates are all contiguous). Funkhouser used Claymont as his private residence. The grounds and gardens were meticulously tended during this period.

- 1972-1975: J. Glenn Brown

Brown had purchased Blakeley Mansion. (He was the son of DuPont executive J. Thompson Brown.) He and his family lived at Blakeley from 1954-1979. He sold Claymont along with 418 acres to the Claymont Society in 1975. The deed of sale included easement restrictions that preserved the property from development.

- 1975–present: The Claymont Society for Continuous Education

John G. Bennett, an English philosopher and scientist, led a non profit. It purchased Claymont to establish an intentional community. Today, what is known as The Claymont Society for Continuous Education continues as a non-profit focused on lifelong learning and principles of sustainability.

== Description ==
Claymont Court is unusually large, and was particularly expensive, reputed to have cost $30,000 when constructed. The design may have been derived from an illustration in Robert Morris's Select Architecture:Being Regular Designs of Plans and Elevations Well Suited to Both Town and Country, published in 1755. The two-story brick house is arranged with a transverse hall, linking the house's wings with the main block.

== Current use ==
Of the eight remaining Washington family homes in Jefferson County, Claymont is considered the grandest. At 16,000 square feet (1,500 m^{2}), it is also the largest. In 1973, Claymont was added to the National Register of Historic Places, a US government list of buildings and structures deemed worthy of preservation.

Today, Claymont operates as a non-profit retreat center run by The Claymont Society for Continuous Education. Its members focus on the systematic philosophical and psychological teachings of John G. Bennett. While Bennett was alive, Claymont operated as a nine-month Fourth Way school focused on his specific teachings, which dealt with techniques of self-reflection, self-development, and spirituality, a systems discipline called Systematics, and achieving a sustainable relationship with nature. After Bennett died in December 1974, the nine-month basic course project continued for a few years under the direction of his students but was eventually discontinued.

Claymont was adapted to be used as a non-profit retreat center for many different spiritual groups, healthcare professionals, meditation groups, environmental groups, professional dancers, and more. Its residential rooms were retrofitted with showers; utilities were updated for hot water, electricity, natural gas, and Wi-Fi. The mansion proper serves as the retreat center.

The non-profit maintains a strong focus on organic farming, buying local, and sustainability. Claymont hosts WWOOFers to work on the grounds and help with local agriculture in exchange for free food and lodging. A nearby 450-foot (140 m) cattle barn has been converted into a conference center. In addition, much of the estate grounds are currently maintained, including the front and rear mansion lawns. The old gardens, however, which were damaged in a storm, have proven too difficult to maintain. They are not in use.

The Claymont Society for Continuous Education advocates strongly for Claymont Court's continuing physical restoration. Claymont has received grant money for restoration through the 1772 Foundation, Save America's Treasures, Jefferson County Commission, and individual donations. The Claymont Society works in tandem with the National Park Trust to lobby for continuing preservation grants.

Among recent restorations, the mansion has a completely rebuilt second-floor veranda, new support beams for the main ballroom, and new window seals and gutter systems. The mansion can still be considered under restoration, though it is fully operational with all utilities.

== Gallery ==
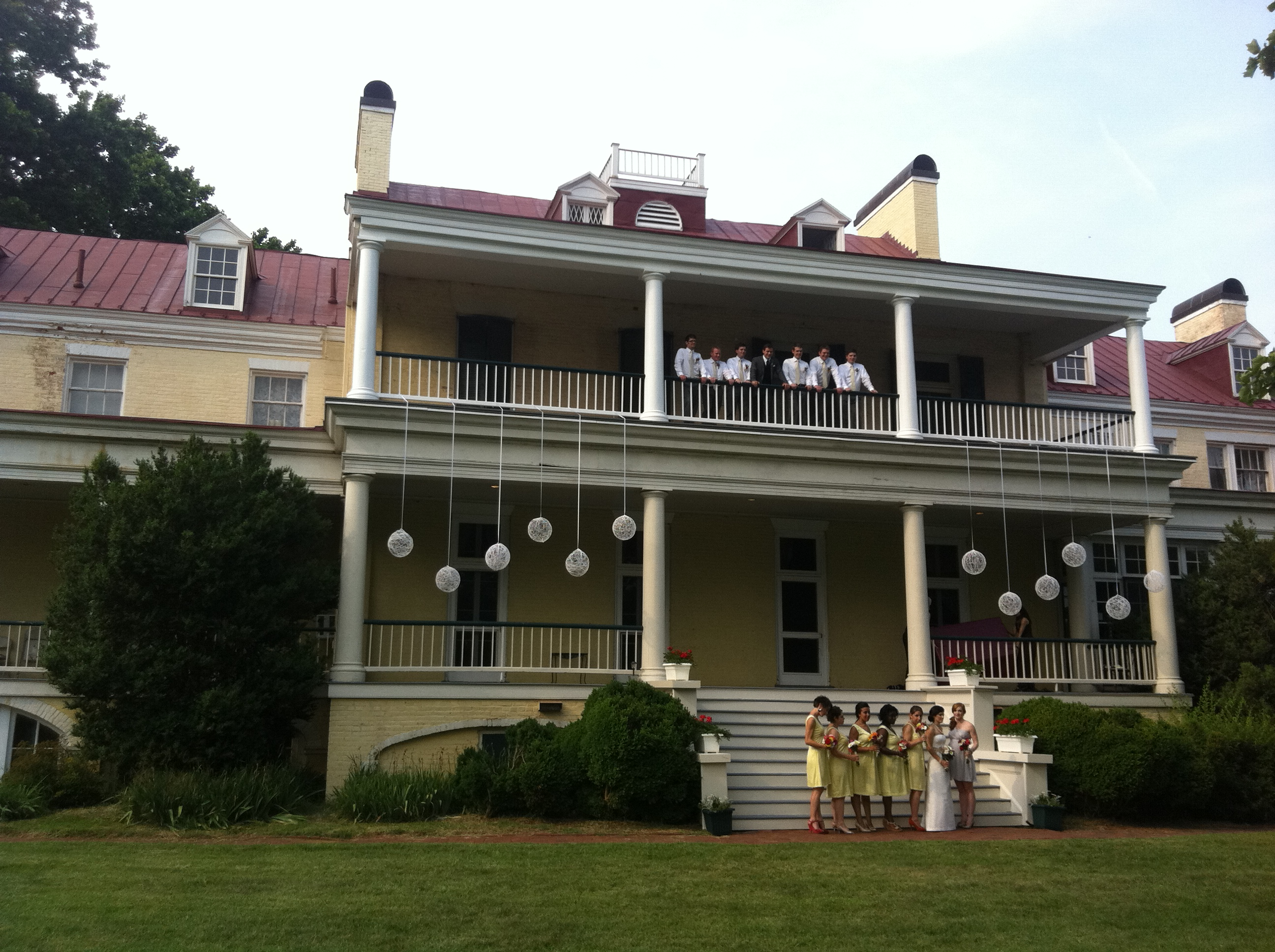
A wedding rehearsal on the rear terrace of the mansion

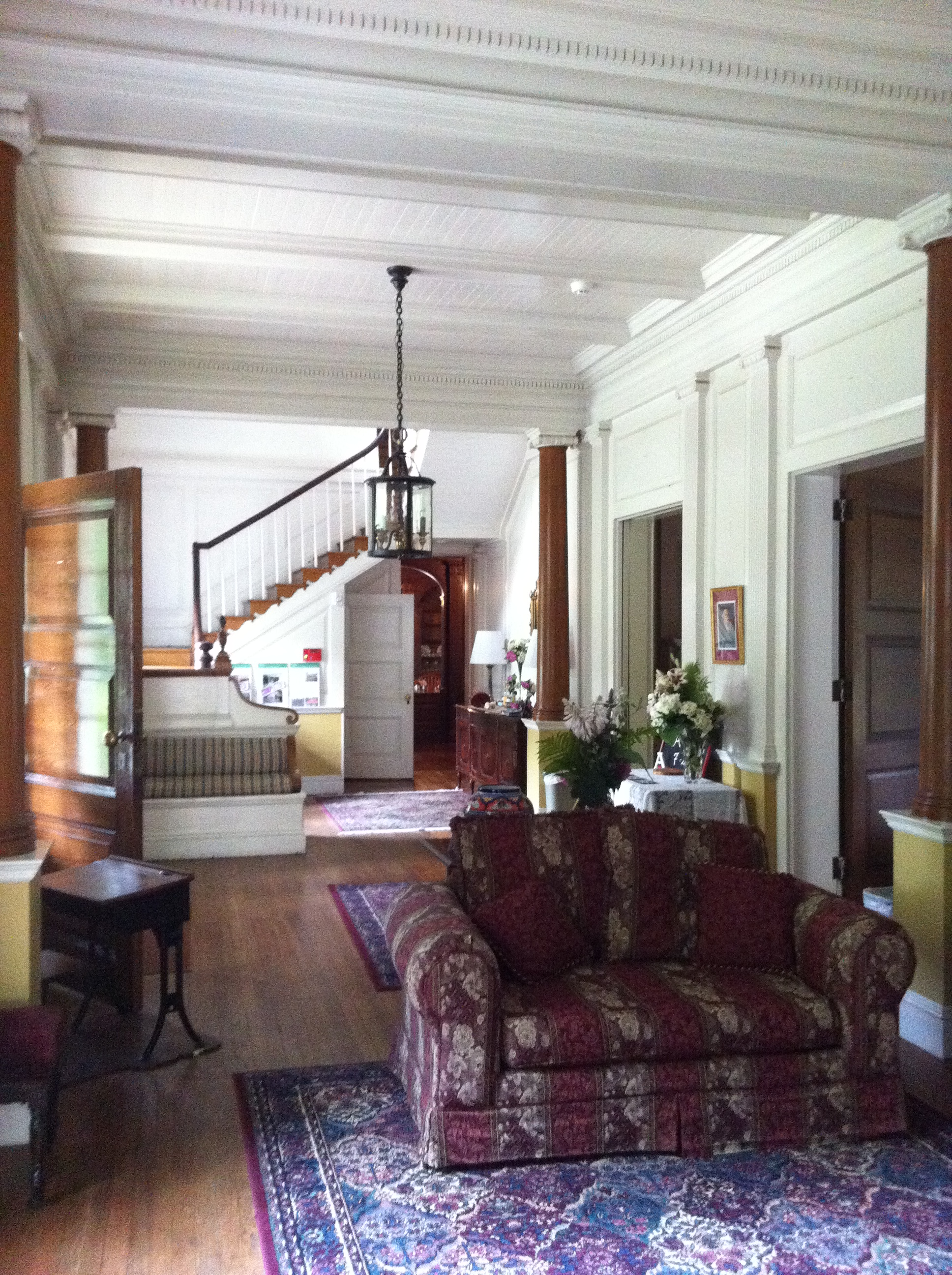
Foyer. The pine flooring of the house is of high tar content and thought to be termite resistant.

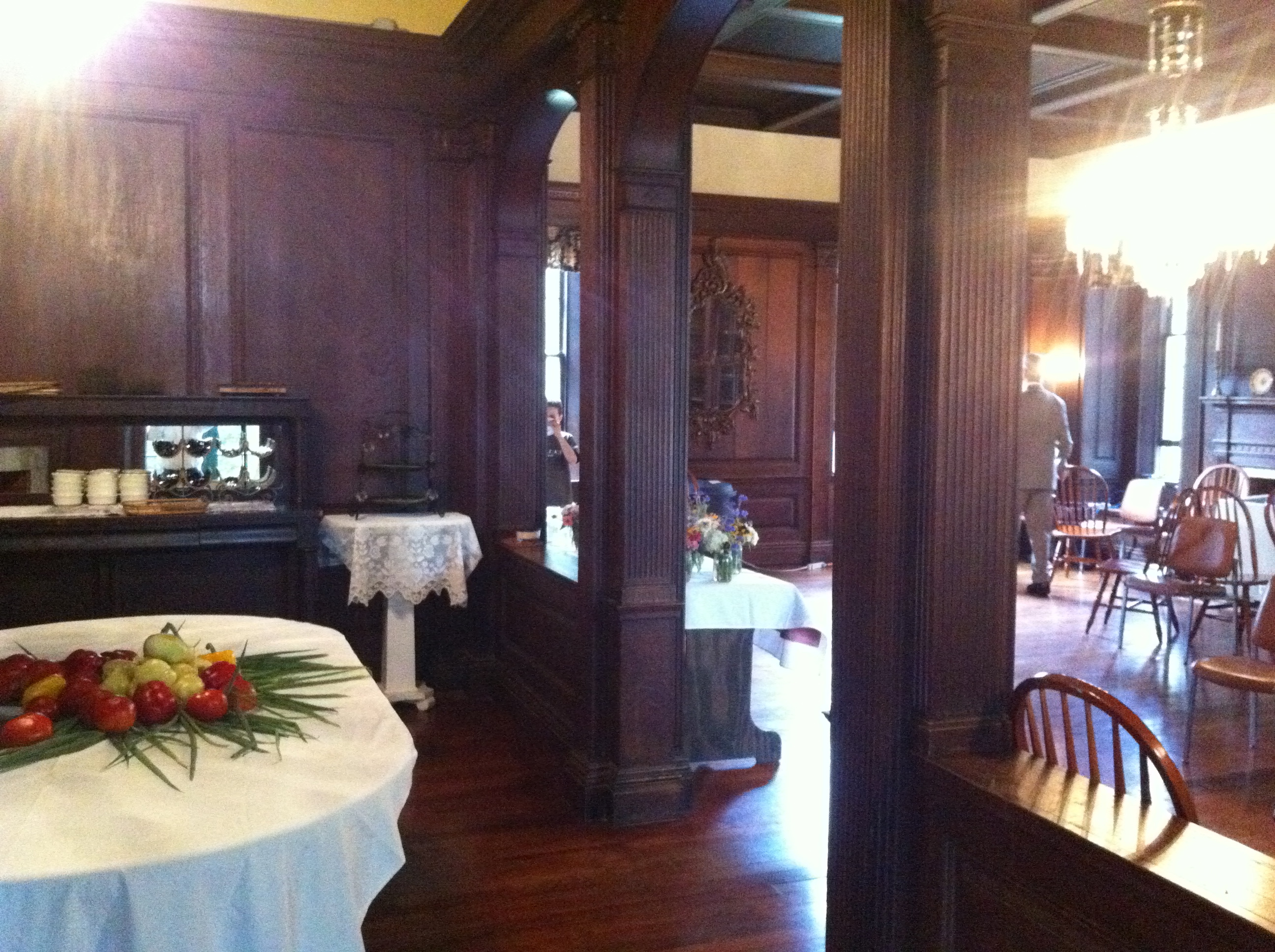
A view of the main dining room

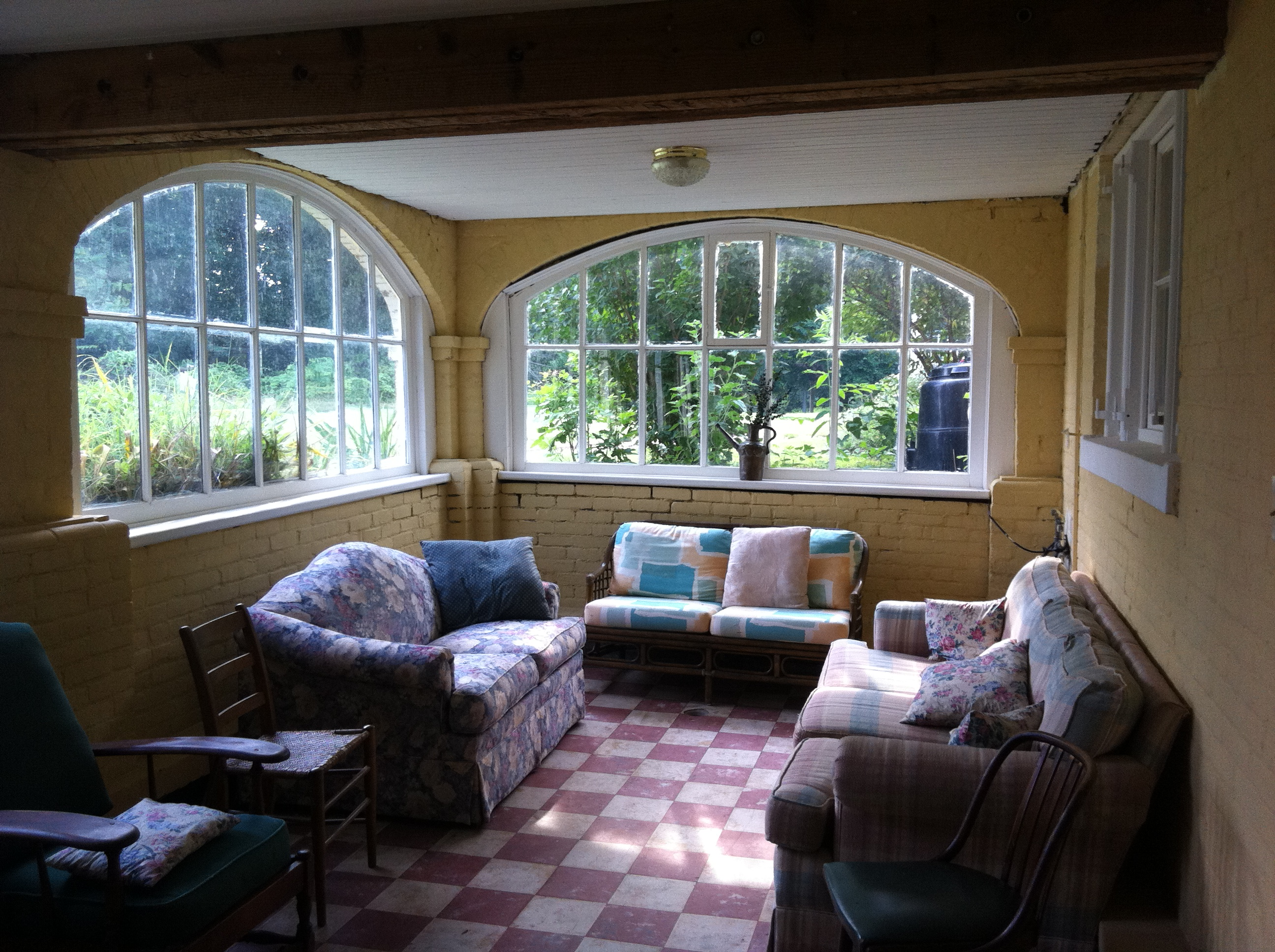
The sun room of a newly restored dependency of the mansion

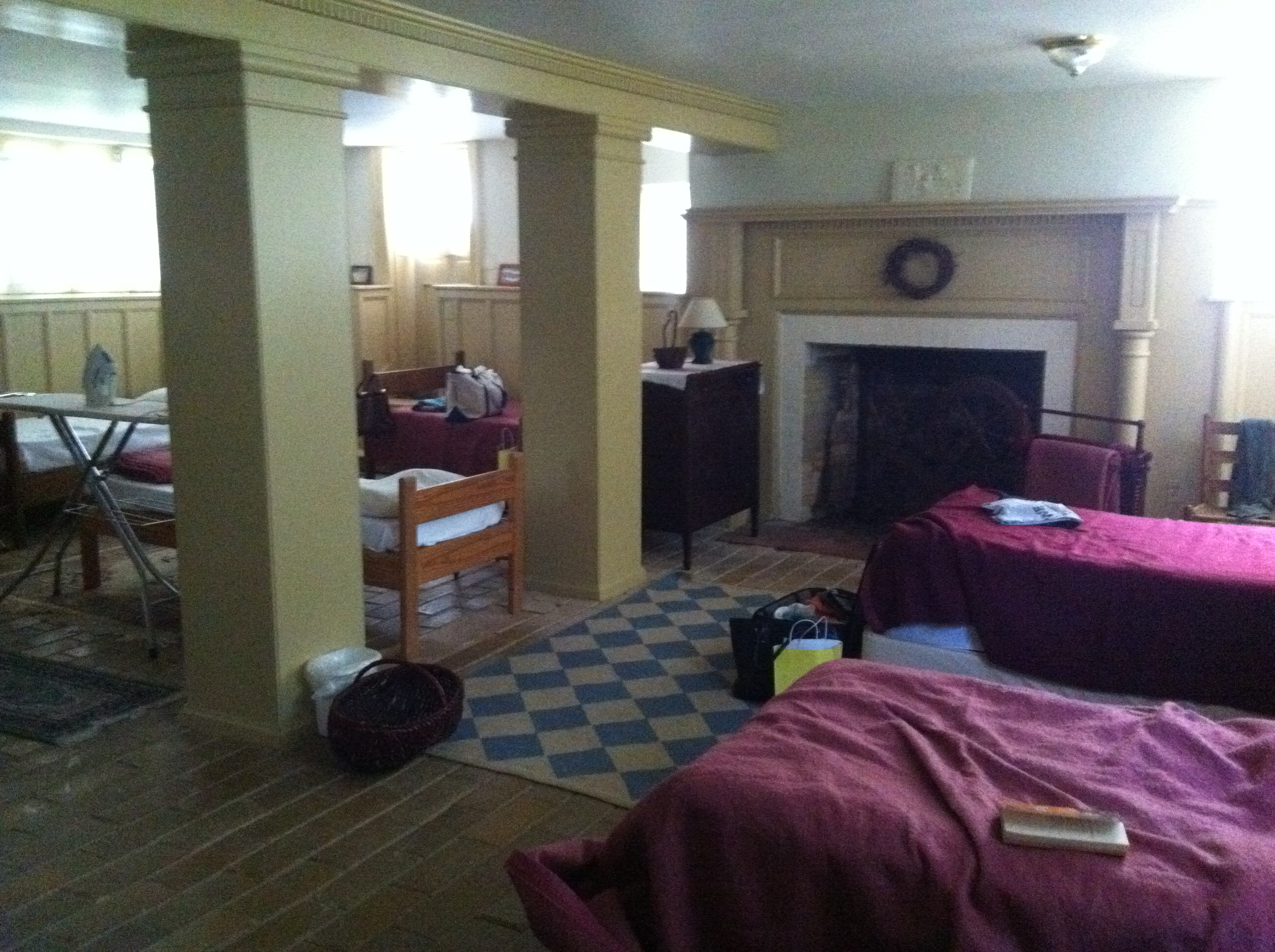
A dependency of the mansion, which was converted into a dormitory for retreat guests

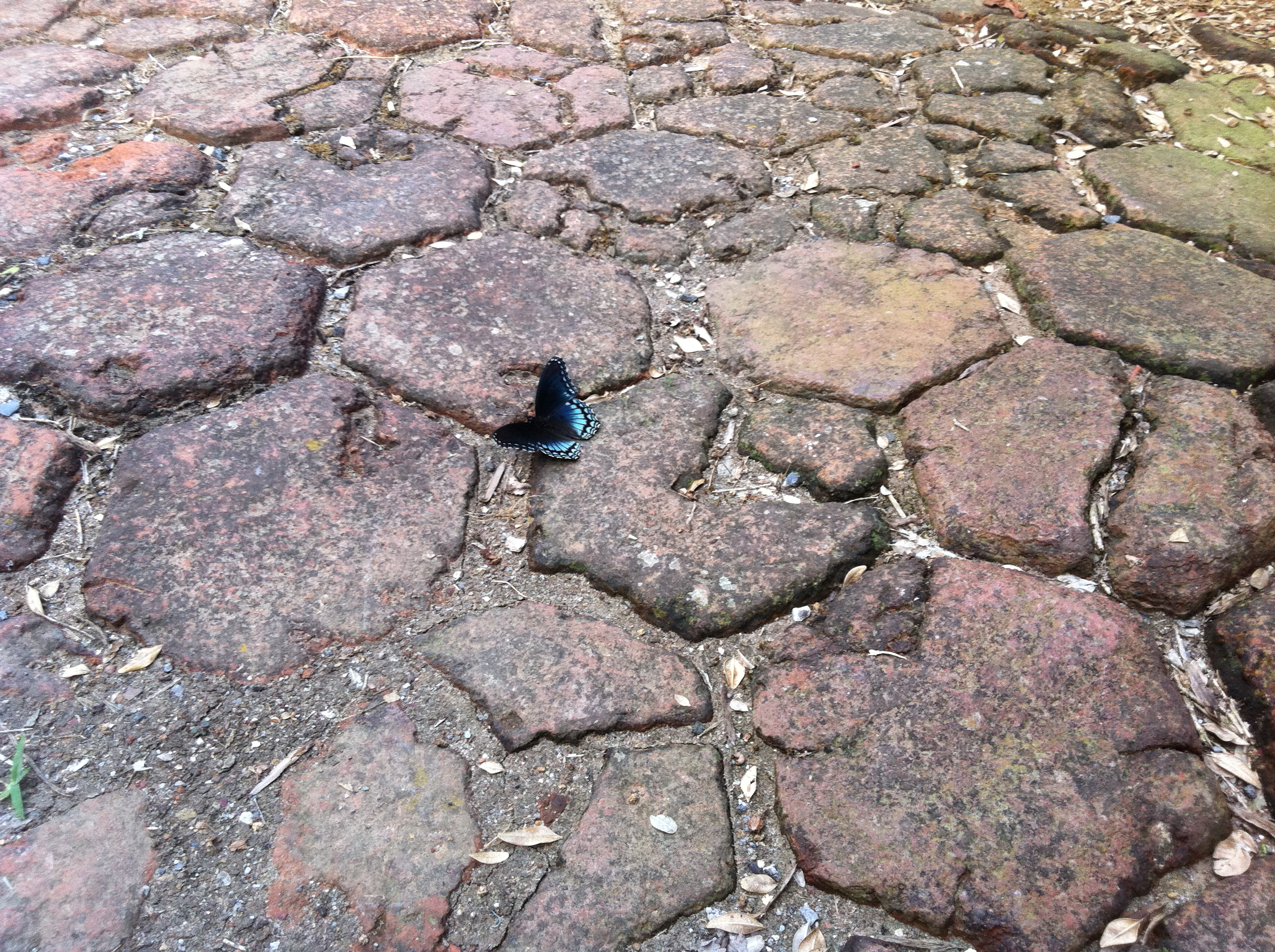
Butterfly on the estate grounds

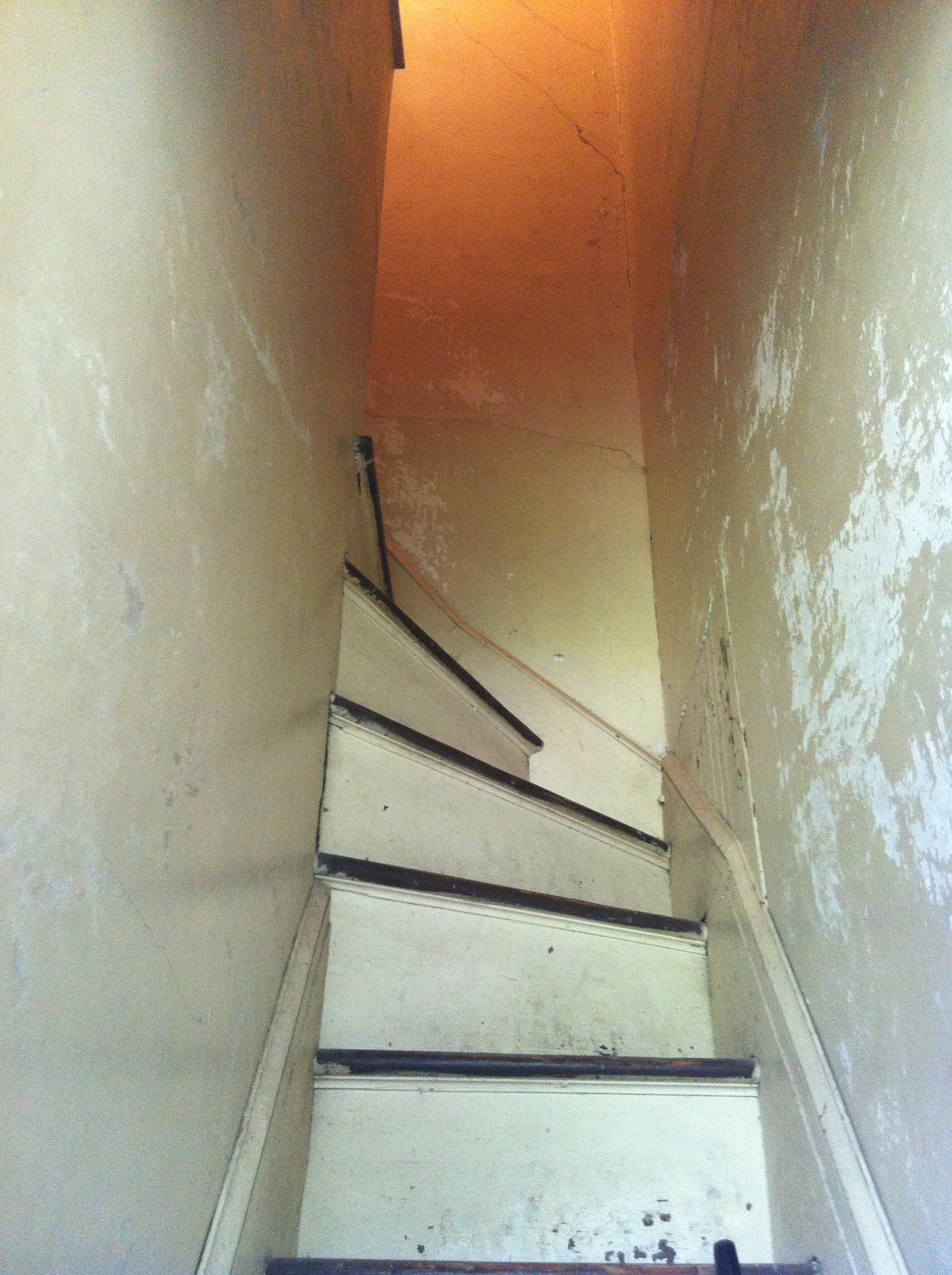
A secret, small staircase winds from the kitchen to an upstairs parlor. It was used by the Claymont staff.

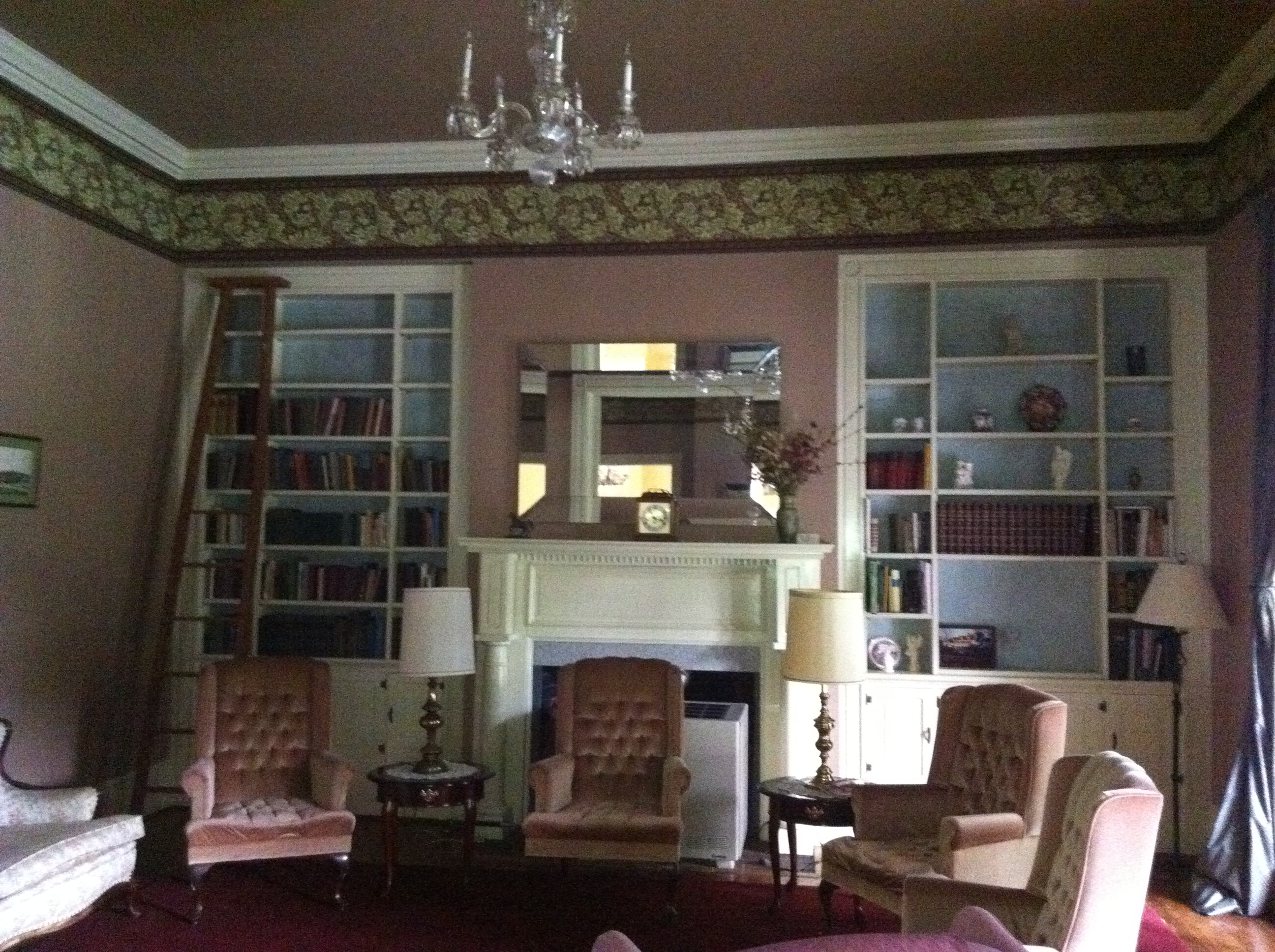
Library

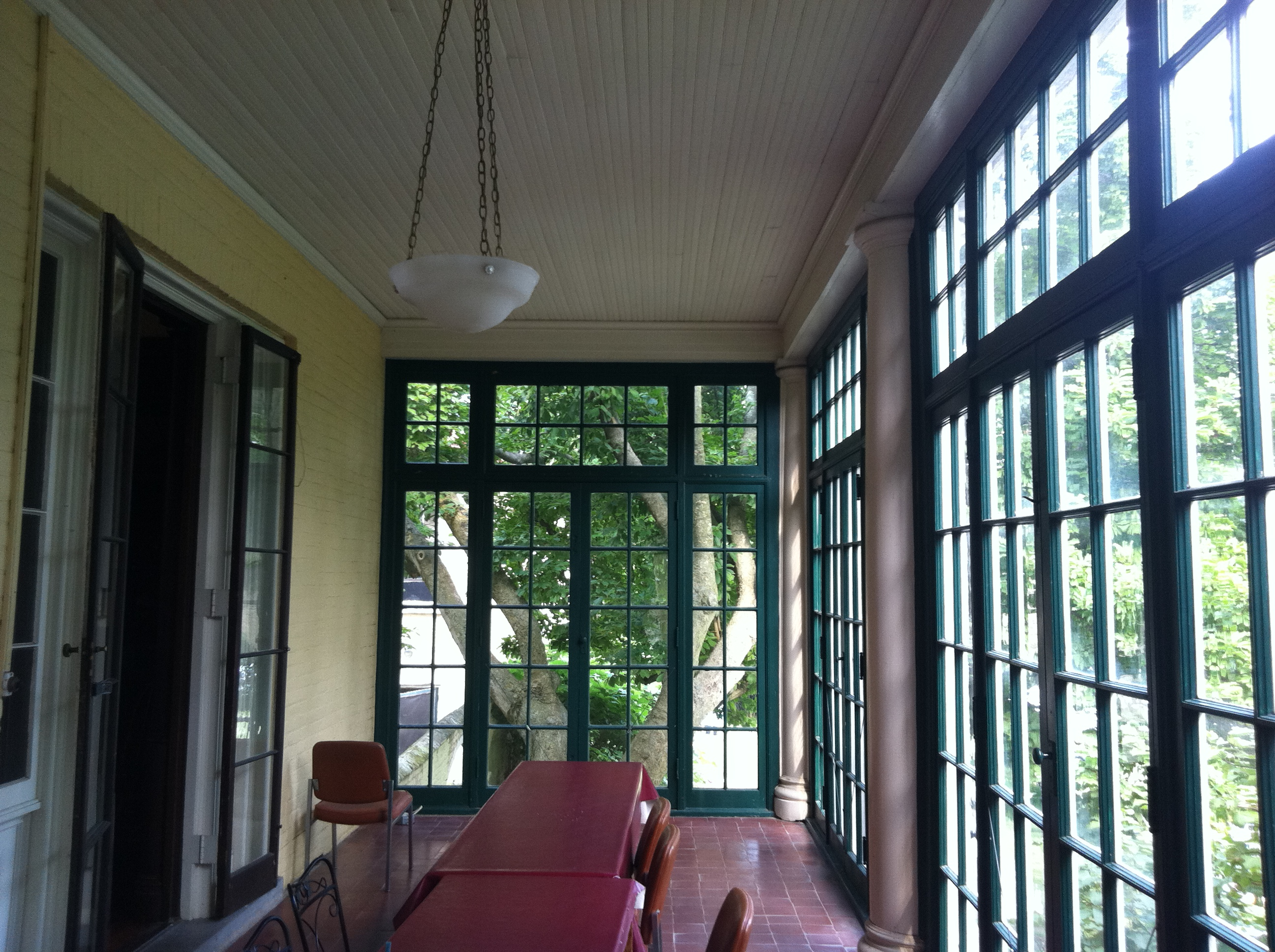
Parlor

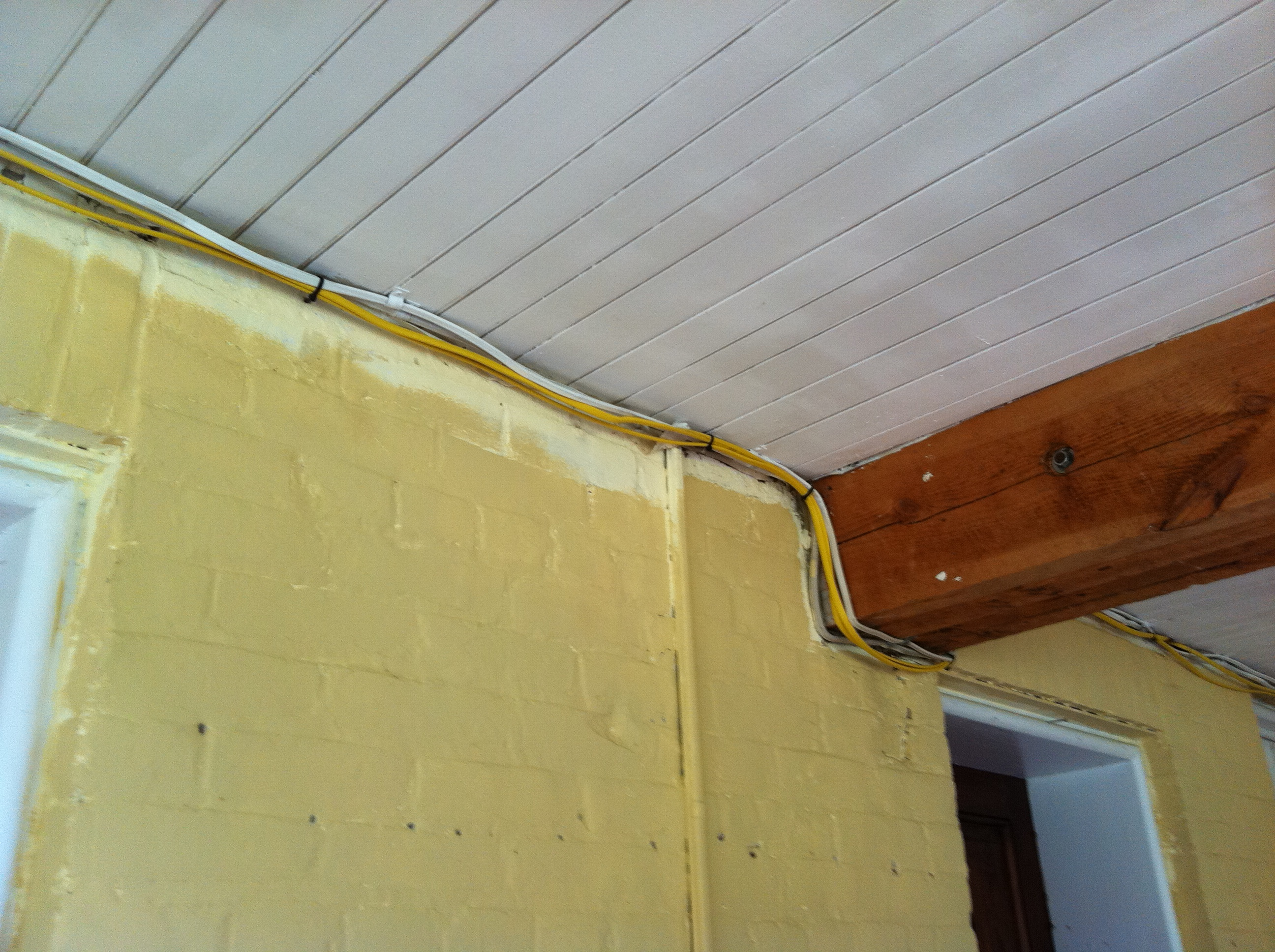
A dependency of the mansion with newly restored brick, support beams, and retrofitted with electricity

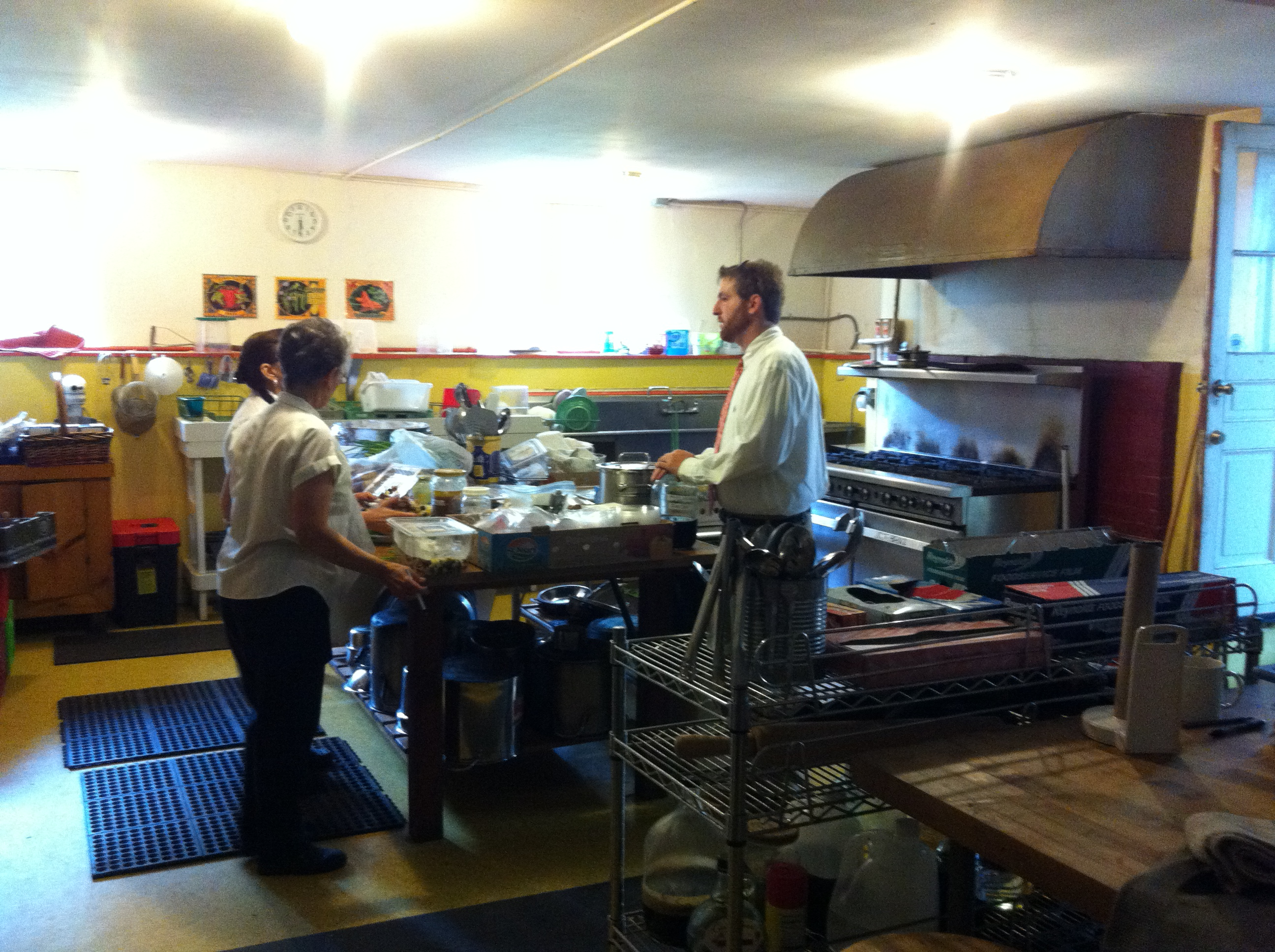
The mansion has a fully operational, industrial-grade kitchen located in the basement. The original kitchen, where the 1838 fire was thought to have started, has been converted to use as a pantry and washroom.

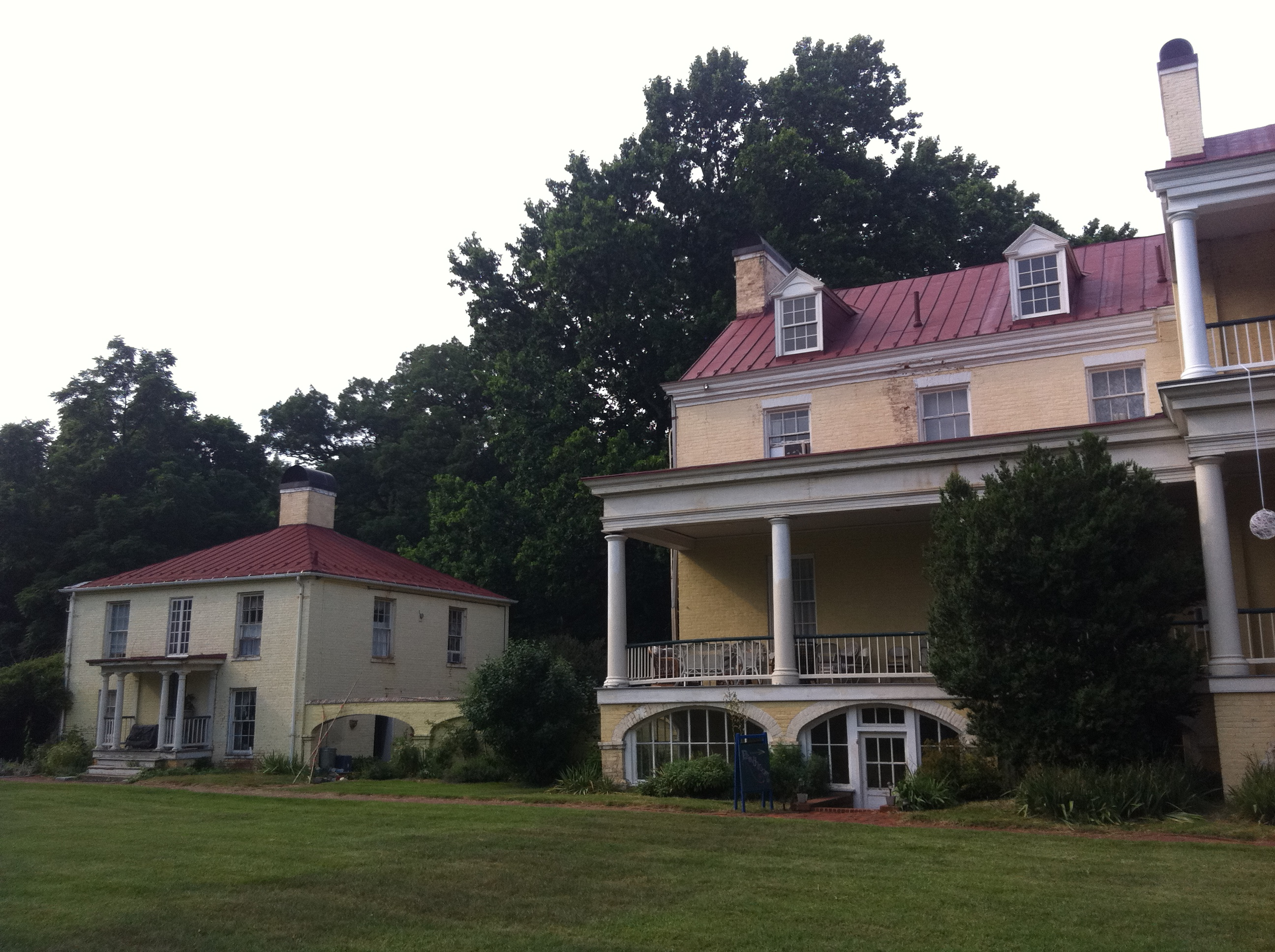
The mansion shown with dependency to the left

== See also ==
- Cedar Lawn
- Harewood (West Virginia)
- Happy Retreat
