= Frances W. Delehanty =

American artist and illustrator (1879–1977)

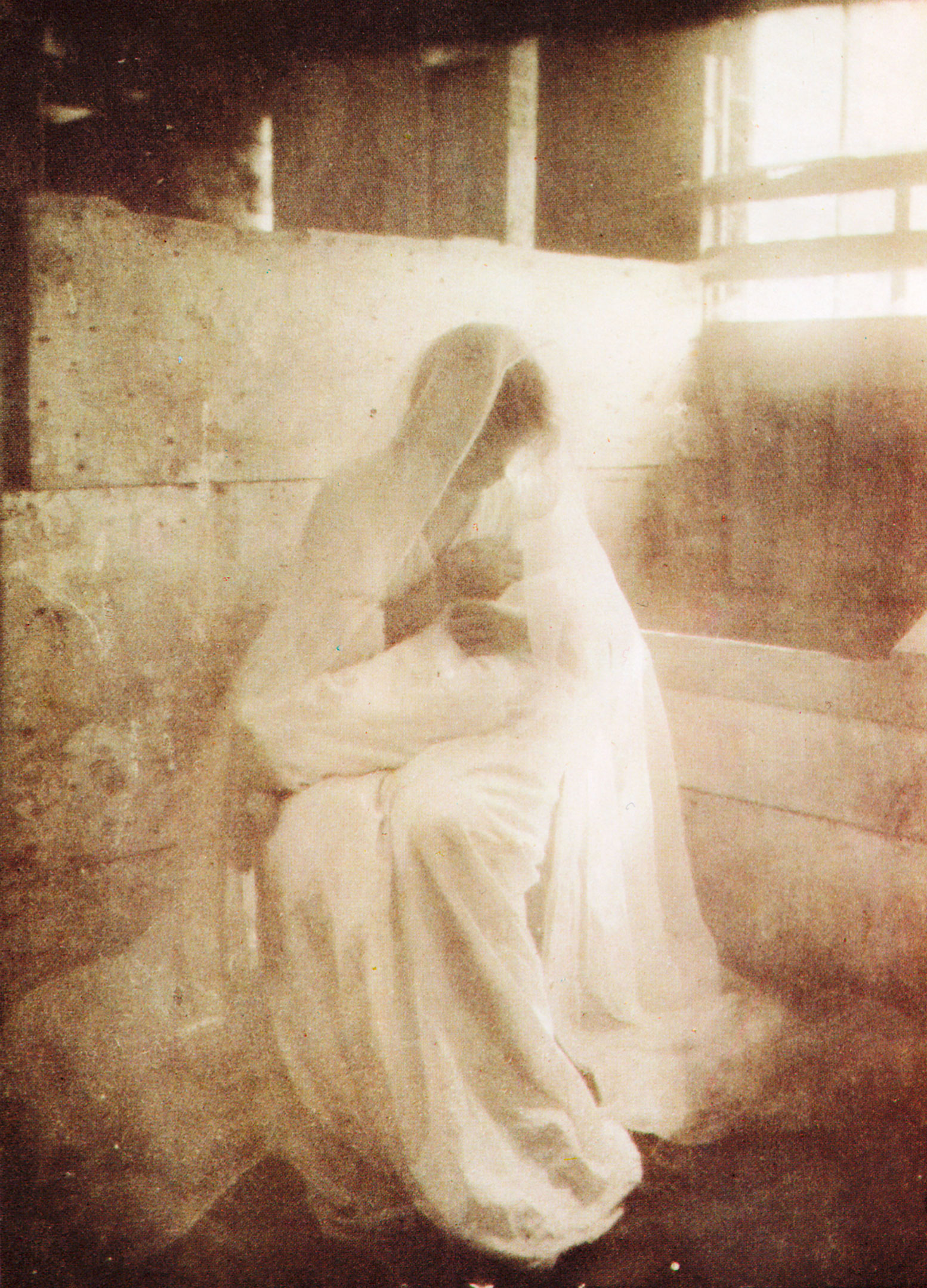
Gertrude Kasebier, "The Manger" (1899); Frances Delehanty is the model in this image

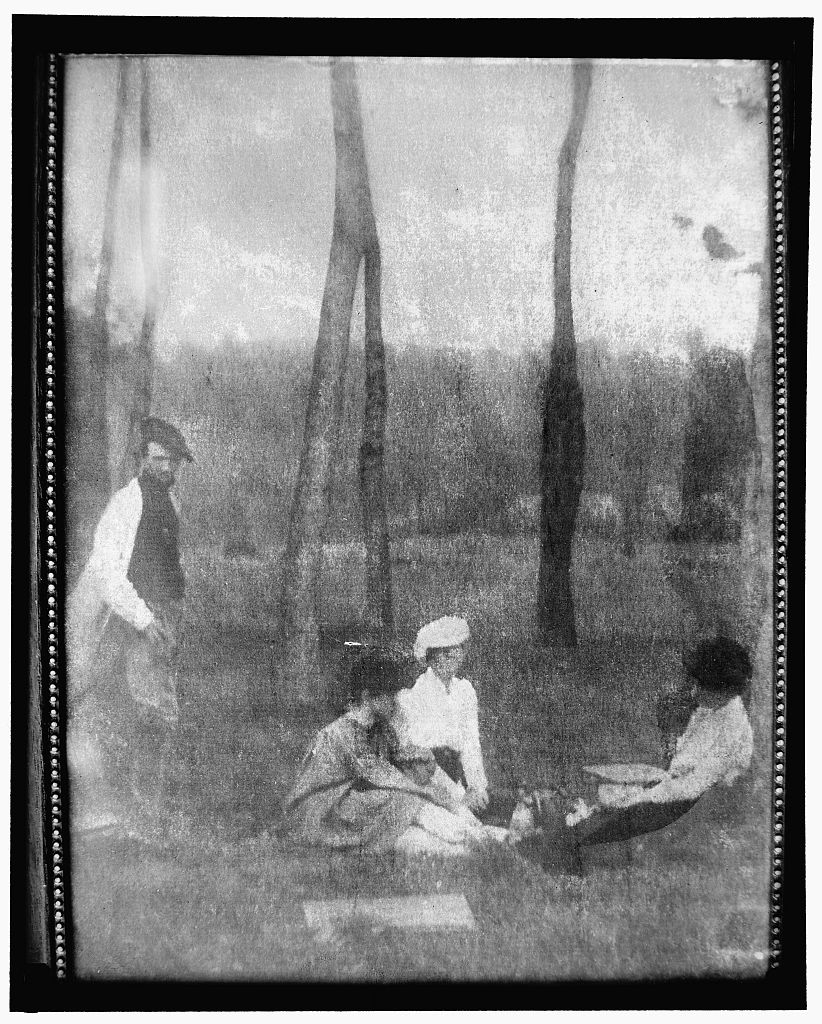
Edward Steichen, Frances Delehanty, Charlotte Smith (Paddock), and Hermine Käsebier (Turner) at Voulangis, France, posed in the spirit of the French Impressionists, photographed by Gertrude Käsebier (1901), from the Library of Congress

Frances Washington Delehanty (January 31, 1879 – January 8, 1977) was an American artist and illustrator, and a noted designer of bookplates, posters, and toy theatres. Later in life she helped to establish the Abbey of Regina Laudis on her property in Connecticut.

== Early life and education ==
Frances Washington Delehanty was born in Washington, D.C. and raised in New York, the daughter of Daniel Delehanty and Fanny Madison Washington Delehanty. Her father was a Naval officer. She was descended from George Washington's brother Samuel Washington, through her maternal grandfather, editor Benjamin Franklin Washington. Delehanty attended the Academy of the Visitation, a Roman Catholic girls' school in Brooklyn, New York.

As a young woman she traveled in Europe with photographer Gertrude Käsebier and her daughter Hermine. Delehanty is featured in one of Käsebier's better known photographs, titled "The Manger" (1899).

She also studied art at Pratt Institute. In 1915, Vanity Fair called her "the Queen of the Benedict Art-Village and absolute ruler of the Dutch Oven outdoor cafe", in an illustrated story about artists in Washington Square Park. During World War I she used her French skills as a nurse in France.

== Career in art ==
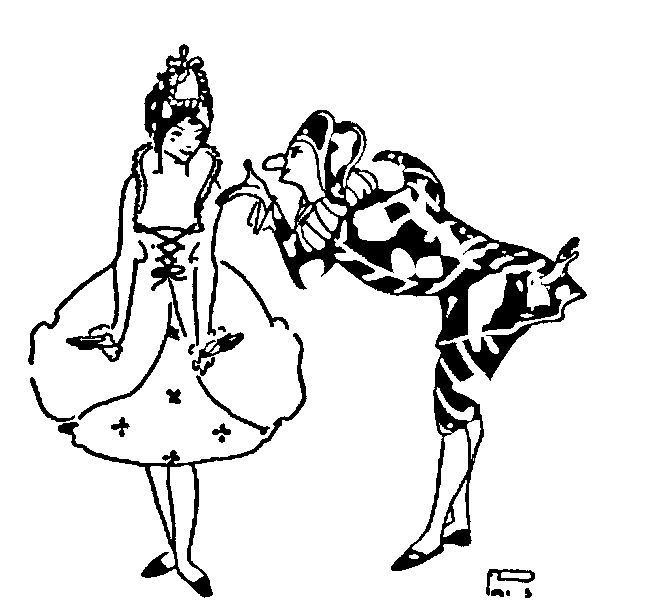
Delehanty illustrations for Neith Boyce's "Love in a Dutch Garden" (Harper's Weekly 1914)

Delehanty's illustrations appeared in national magazines including Everybody's Magazine Bookman magazine, and Harper's Weekly. She illustrated the books The Works of Jesus (1909) by Edna S. Little, Love in a Dutch Garden (1914) by Neith Boyce, More Fairytale Plays (1917) by Marguerite Merington, Gertrude Crownfield's Heralds of the King (1931), and Justine Ward's Sunday Mass (1932). She wrote and illustrated Canticle of the Three Children in the Fiery Furnace (1936), and They Go to Mass (1938).

Delehanty was a prolific designer of bookplates. She designed posters for actress Minnie Maddern Fiske. She also made miniature cardboard "fairy playhouses" or toy theaters for children. "There is individuality abundantly manifest in all this remarkable girl does," marveled one newspaper profile in 1913.

Delehanty showed four portraits at the annual art exhibition in Stockbridge, Massachusetts in 1922. She also had a group of "fashionable" portraits on exhibit in New York, and at the Gillespie Gallery in Pittsburgh, in 1927.

== Abbey founding ==
Frances W. "Fanny" Delehanty lived in Bethlehem, Connecticut with fellow artist Lauren Ford (1891–1973), next door to Ford's adopted daughter, Dora Stone. In 1947, the pair helped to establish the Abbey of Regina Laudis near their farm in Connecticut. It was the first American monastery for cloistered Benedictine nuns. The founding of the abbey was the inspiration for a film, Come to the Stable (1949), written by Clare Booth Luce and starring Loretta Young and Celeste Holm; Elsa Lanchester played the eccentric, artistic, religious landowner character "Amelia Potts" (taking the place of both Ford and Delehanty).

== Death ==
Delehanty died at home in Connecticut after a long illness in 1977, at age 97.
