= Blakeley (West Virginia) =

Historic house in West Virginia, United States

- U.S. National Register of Historic Places
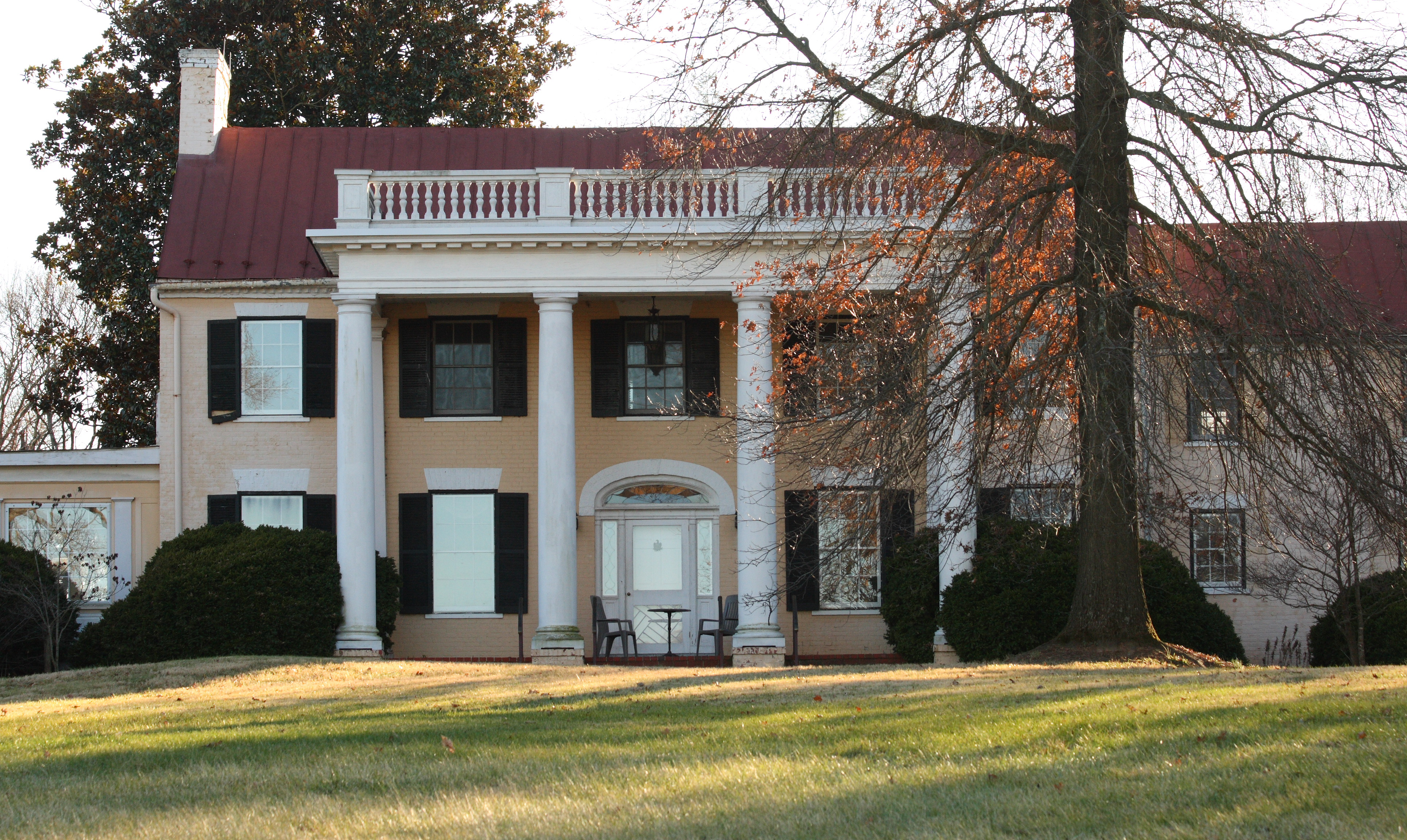

- Location within West Virginia Location within the United States
- Nearest city: Charles Town, West Virginia
- Coordinates: 39°15′36″N 77°54′25″W
- Built: 1820
- Architectural style: Greek Revival, Federal
- NRHP reference No.: 82004319
- Added to NRHP: April 15, 1982

Blakeley, near Charles Town, West Virginia, and also known as the Washington - Chew - Funkhouser House, was built in 1820 by John Augustine Washington II, great-nephew of George Washington and grandson of John Augustine Washington. It is a contemporary of its neighbor, Claymont Court, built across Bullskin Run by John's brother, Bushrod Corbin Washington. John Washington did not attempt to match the grandeur of Claymont Court, as he was in line to inherit Mount Vernon, and did so in 1829.

== Description ==
When it was originally built, Blakeley was a Federal style two-story brick house, three bays wide, with a western wing and a one-story portico. Renovations in the 1940s changed it to a five-bay structure, with a new Doric two-story portico and an elliptical transom over the front door. The interior of the main house has eight rooms with a central hallway.

== History ==
Upon John Augustine Washington's death at Mount Vernon in 1832, his son, Richard Blackburn Washington, inherited Blakeley. In 1844 Richard married his cousin, Christian Washington of Harewood. In 1859, Richard was part of the posse that pursued John Brown's Raiders. After the death of Richard's brother John Augustine Washington III in 1861 while fighting for the Confederacy, John's eight orphaned children came to live at Blakeley, joining Richard and Christian Washington's seven. In 1864 Blakeley was extensively damaged by fire, but was rebuilt by Richard. In 1875 Richard was forced to sell Blakeley and moved with his family to Harewood.

The house was purchased by Louise Fontaine Washington Chew, the niece of Richard B. Washington. Chew's husband, Colonel R. Preston Chew was a local businessman, the president of the Charles Town Mining, Manufacturing and Improvement Company. The house was then sold in 1892 to John Burns, a local farmer and community leader.

Blakeley was purchased in 1943 by industrialist Raymond J. Funkhouser, who undertook its restoration. Funkhouser had also purchased Claymont Court, which he used as his residence. It was Funkhouser who, feeling that a Washington house should be more grand, and wishing to complement Claymont Court, added the two-story portico. The interior was more carefully renovated, and in keeping with the historical record.

== See also ==
- Happy Retreat
