= Happy Retreat =

Historic house in West Virginia, United States

- Charles Washington House
- U.S. National Register of Historic Places
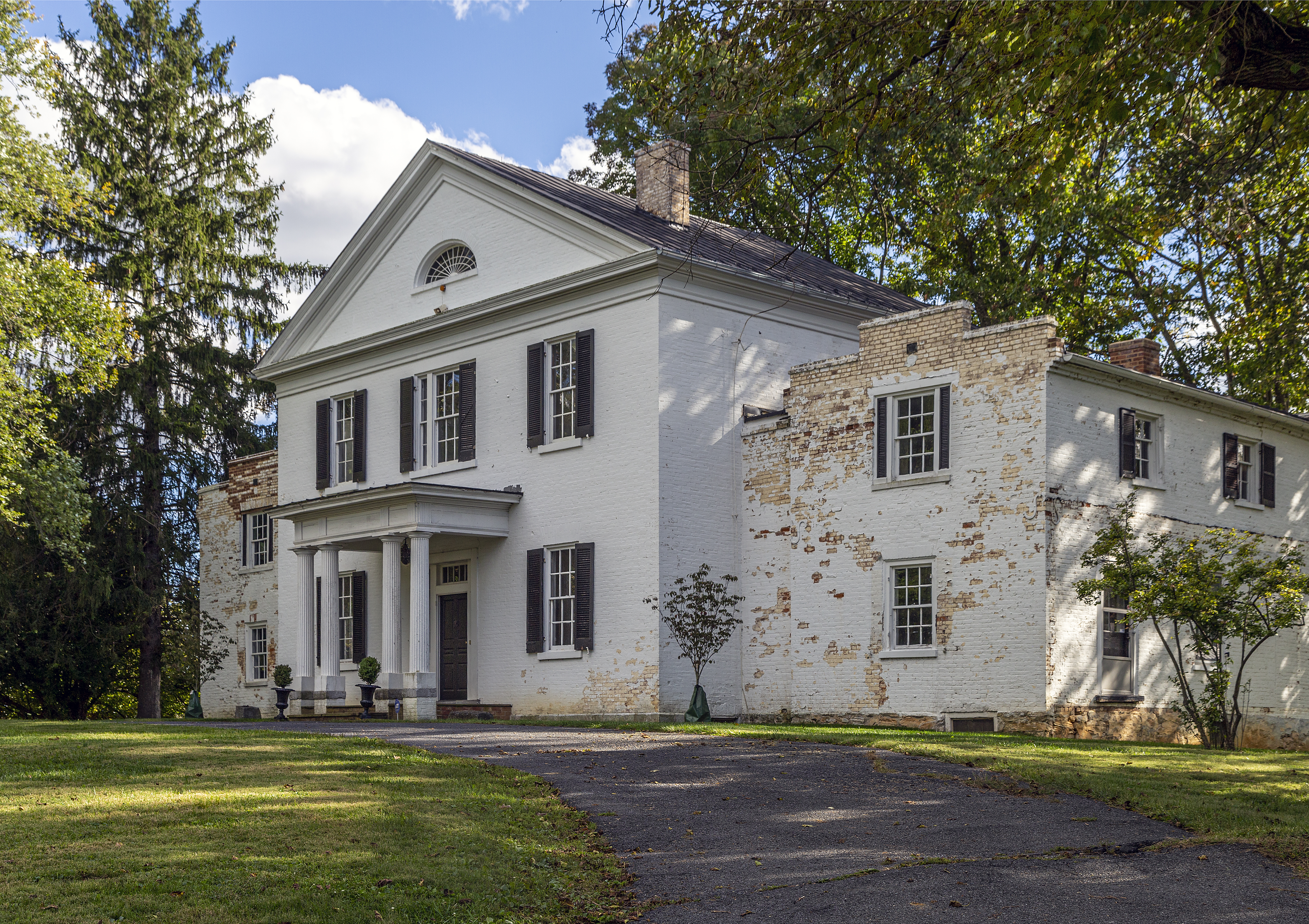
- Front of the house

- Location within West Virginia Location within the United States
- Location: Blakeley Plaza, Charles Town, West Virginia
- Coordinates: 39°16′56″N 77°51′35″W
- Area: 0.5 acres (0.20 ha)
- Built: 1780
- Architectural style: Early Republic, Classical Revival
- NRHP reference No.: 73001912
- Added to NRHP: July 2, 1973

Happy Retreat (also known as Charles Washington House and Mordington) is a historic property in Charles Town, West Virginia, which was originally owned and developed by Charles Washington, the youngest brother of George Washington and the founder of Charles Town.

== Description ==
Happy Retreat is a 2 1/2-story white-painted brick structure, with two-story flanking wings. The main facade has a prominent Doric pediment with no colonnade. An elliptical fanlight is centered in the pediment. Below, the main facade is three bays wide, with a one-story flat-roofed porch supported by Doric columns. The wings are attached by short hyphens, and have stepped masonry gables. The wings predate the central block. The main block features a transverse entry hall across the width of the block. Apart from the massing, the exterior has been extensively altered using revival-syle details and elements.

== History ==
Charles inherited land in the Shenandoah Valley upon the death of his older brother Lawrence in 1752. Charles was 14 years of age at the time, and living at Ferry Farm, near Fredericksburg, Virginia. In 1780, Charles and his wife Mildred moved to his land from Fredericksburg. By that time, he had constructed two one-story structures on the property, separated by a breezeway or portico, and had named the property "Happy Retreat.". In October 1786, by act of the Virginia General Assembly, Charles Town was established on 80 acres (320,000 m^{2}) of Charles's land adjacent to Happy Retreat, and Charles played an important role in planning the streets and construction activities of the new town.

Although Happy Retreat is usually considered to have been established in 1780, there is reason to believe that Charles's land may have been farmed as early as 1768. This date appears on the cornerstone of the old kitchen at Happy Retreat, but has never been fully authenticated. The structure of, and materials used in, the kitchen and old brick smoke-house would indicate them to be pre-Revolutionary, and a clay-chinked limestone quarters which stood until recent years behind the kitchen and smoke-house possibly predated the kitchen. An octagonal wooden powder-house similar to the one at Mount Vernon exists today and is supposed to have held powder stores during the Revolution. Later it was used as a school house for Charles and Mildred's children.

On his visits from his home in Fredericksburg to his property prior to 1780, Charles Washington is said to have lived in a small house, since disintegrated, on Evitts Run, a small stream that flows along the base of the hill at Happy Retreat. From this temporary dwelling he could well have directed the work of brick-making for the residence he had planned, as there are claybeds along the Run. Stone and timber cutting could also have been supervised nearby, as the surrounding meadows are laced with limestone outcroppings, and the property included ample woodland.

General George Washington visited his brother at Happy Retreat several times. On June 1, 1788, while he was interested in the building of a canal up the Potomac River, he inspected the work at Great Falls and Seneca Falls, dined at Leesburg, proceeded the following day to what is now Harper's Ferry, and on the 3rd arrived at Happy Retreat, where he dined and spent the night. Other visits to Charles are recorded in the General's diaries for this period.

During the few months before his death in April, 1799, Charles transferred all his property to his son Samuel Washington and his heirs, which explains why there remained no property to be transferred in Charles' will. On February 23, 1800, Samuel Washington sold Happy Retreat, including the mansion and 100 acres (0.40 km^{2}) of land, to Thomas Hammond. The property stayed in the Hammond family until 1837 when George Washington Hammond sold it to the Hon. Isaac R. Douglass, a circuit court judge and real estate investor. After his purchase of Happy Retreat, Judge Douglass completed the plans for the central section of the house and built a three-story brick structure, connecting the two old Washington wings. He renamed the completed mansion "Mordington," after his ancestral estate in Scotland. The house passed through the hands of a number of different owners, reverting to its original name of Happy Retreat, before its purchase by Mr. and Mrs. William Gavin in the 1960s.

A recent historical engineering analysis of Happy Retreat indicates that the home's development proceeded in three phases. Phase 1 construction consisted of the old stone kitchen and a portion of the west wing. Phase 2 consisted of the brick portion of the kitchen and the one-story east wing. Phase 3, which was undertaken in 1837 after the purchase of Happy Retreat by Judge Douglass, resulted in the addition of the 2nd stories to the two wings and completion of a large 2½ story central portion connecting the two wings.

In September 2014, the city of Charles Town began working toward purchasing the house to include it in its parks system.

== See also ==
- Harewood (West Virginia)
- Claymont Court
- Blakeley (West Virginia)
- Cedar Lawn
