= San Francisco Herald =

19th century American newspaper

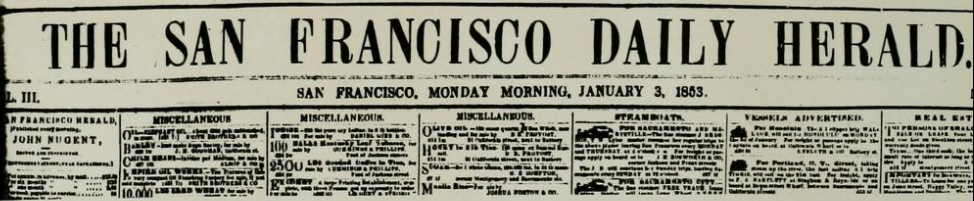

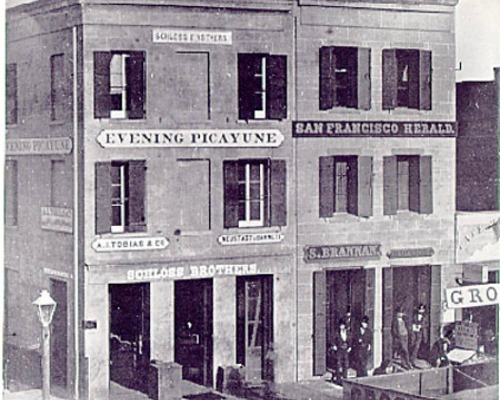
- Type: Daily newspaper
- Format: 4 pages
- Founder(s): John Nugent and John E. Foy
- Launched: 1 June 1850
- Ceased publication: 1862
- Relaunched: 1869
- Political alignment: Democrat
- Language: English
- City: San Francisco, California
- Country: United States
- OCLC number: 8795520

The San Francisco Herald, or San Francisco Daily Herald, (Note: The Library of Congress entry for The San Francisco Herald 1851-1860 says it was published from 1851 to 1860. It then notes that there were daily editions of the San Francisco Daily Herald in 1850. Another Library of Congress entry for The San Francisco Herald 1856-1862 says it was daily (except Sunday). It followed The San Francisco Daily Herald published from 1850 to 1856.) was a newspaper that was published from 1850 to 1862 in San Francisco, California. The paper stood out aggressively against crime and corruption associated with the California Gold Rush. The editors fought several duels with men whom they had offended. In 1856 the paper attacked the Vigilance Committee, which was taking the law into its own hands. Supporters of the committee withdrew their subscriptions and advertising, almost forcing the newspaper to close. However, the newspaper continued to be published with smaller circulation until 1862.

== Early years ==
John Nugent and John E. Foy started the San Francisco Herald on 1 June 1850. In July 1850 Nugent bought out Foy for $15,000. Nugent edited the paper with Edmund Randolph, and William Walker had become a contributor by 1851. John Rollin Ridge, the first editor of the Sacramento Bee, also wrote for the San Francisco Herald among other publications. The California Gold Rush had caused the sleepy town of San Francisco, with 800 people in 1847, to explode to 50,000 in 1850. Crime was rampant. Walker and Nugent outspokenly blamed town officials and judges for allowing the crime wave. According to James O'Meara, Nugent was "a master of pure English and keen in invective. His humor was pungent, his satire of the vitriol variety." His paper soon became the most popular in San Francisco.

The Herald had four pages, 23 1/4 by 18 1/4 inches (590 by 460 mm). Price was 10 cents per issue, $2 per month by mail or $15 per year by mail. A fair amount of material consisted of reprinted material from other newspapers such as the London Times. There was a department called "Topics of the Day" that gave local news and opinion, another that gave write-ups of local concerts, recitals and theatrical shows, and so on. The Herald was the main place where auctioneers placed advertisements, which gave a healthy flow of income.

== Sample editorials ==
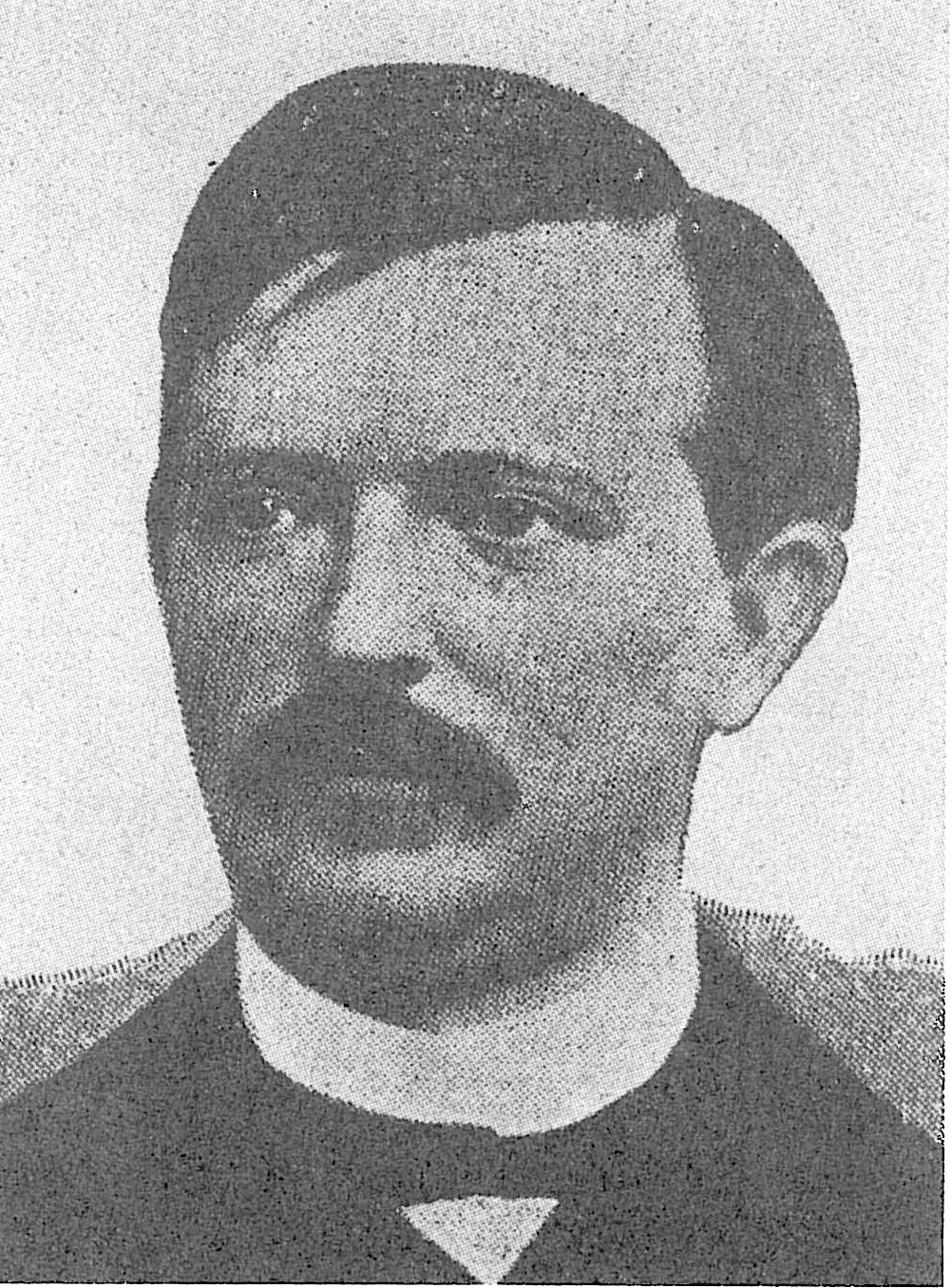
John Nugent

On 1 January 1855 the Daily Herald ran an editorial on the city's progress, referring to a detailed article that described the growth of the city. There were now 638 brick buildings with a valuation of $13,618,750. Among the more valuable, the New Merchant's Exchange, property of Jardine, Matheson & Co. of China, "cost $100,000 and is one of the many instances of confidence in our prosperity exhibited by capitalists abroad." On 7 January 1855 the Daily Herald published an editorial that questioned why the school tax had fallen from $18,685.11 for 1853 to $6,483.24 for 1854 despite the fact that the number of children had grown. The Herald wrote in laudatory terms of homestead associations:

In no other way can a man of small means so cheaply obtain a homestead; and the time is rapidly slipping by in which eligible lots, of sufficient size for a convenient dwelling, can be had in the city limits at less than prices ranging above two thousand dollars each. Today you can, through one of these associations, for $300, payable in instalments of not over ten dollars per month, obtain a lot twenty-five by one hundred feet, in a district that before ten years have passed will be in the midst of the city, and worth fully ten times its present valuation.

On 4 January 1855 the Daily Herald wrote an article headlined "Filth among Chinese" that discussed overcrowded buildings occupied by Chinese immigrants with disposal of "every description of filth" through trap doors cut in the ground floor. The Herald also published a letter expressing concern that Negroes might be voting. In 1853 A.J. Moulder of the Herald presented episodes in the life of Captain Joseph R. Walker, who had explored the Colorado River and Grand Canyon, and met the Hopi of the region. On 5 March 1860 Nugent attacked government-sponsored genocide of the Yuki people,

I propose to the Legislature to create the office of Indian Butcher with the princely salary conferred upon the man who has killed most Indians in a given time, provided it be satisfactorily shown that the Indians were unarmed at the time, and the greater of them were squaws and papooses [women and children].

On 25 January 1855 the Herald ran a story on a bill introduced by Mr. Farwell (Note: Willard Brigham Farwell (1829–1903), former miner, founder of The Daily Whig, member of the State legislature.) requiring all voters, residents in any unincorporated city in the State, to be registered to entitle them to the right of suffrage. Lists were to be prepared at least ten days before any State or Municipal election of the legally qualified voters in each ward, and only these persons would be allowed to vote. The editorial commented "The necessity of such a law must be apparent to all. No honest citizen will object to it... Everyone familiar with San Francisco is aware that for many years past the elections have been carried out by the agency of political bravos, who go around the city voting in every precinct, and often times more than once in each."

== Steamer edition ==
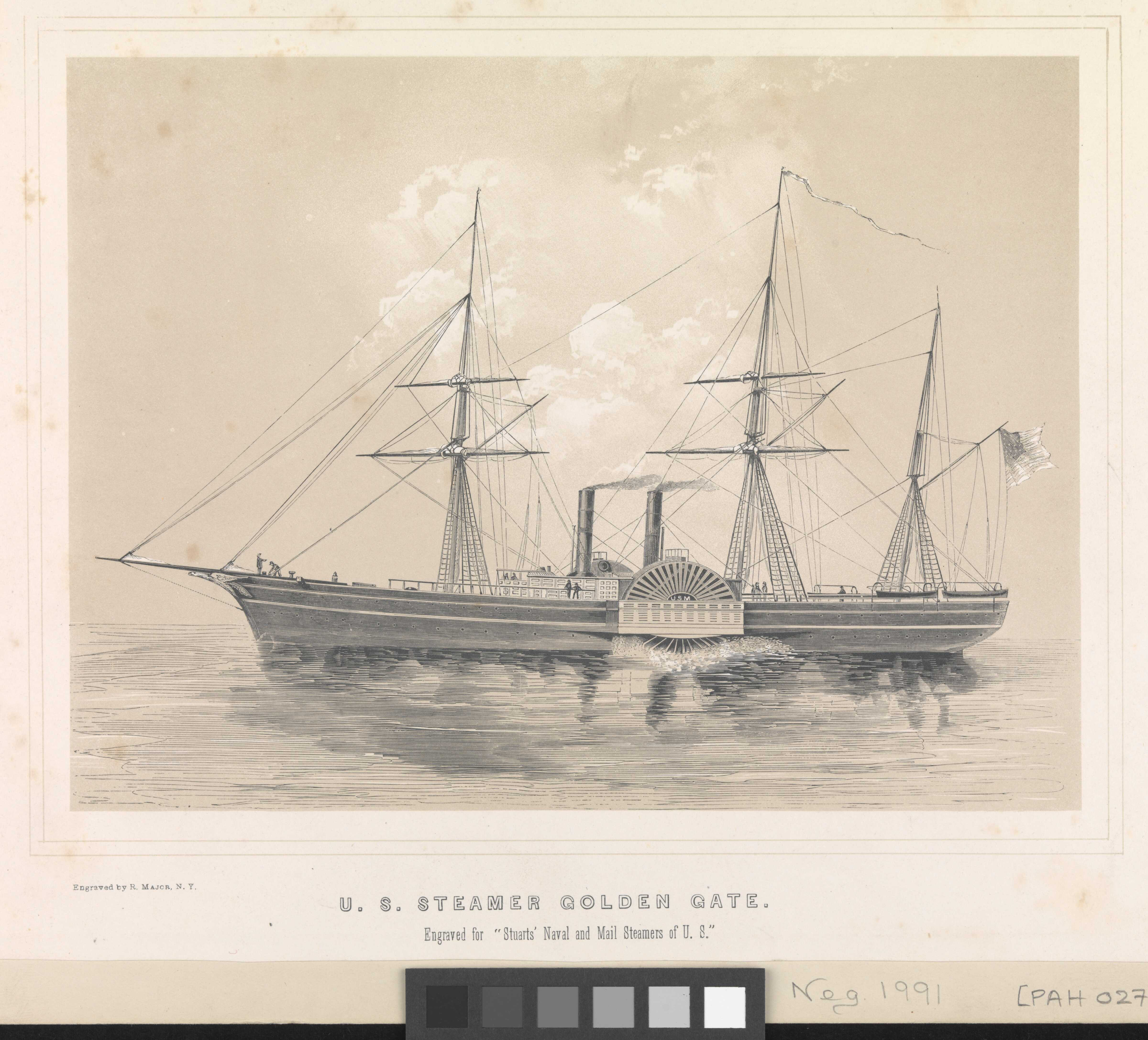
Golden Gate (1851). Passenger and mail steamer that burned in 1862 on voyage from San Francisco to Panama with loss of 204 lives.

In the 1850 the overland journey from San Francisco to the east coast took several months. On 20 January 1856 the Daily Herald wrote, "There never was probably a project started which has met with more universal approbation than the one for the establishment of a wagon route across the plains." It went on to say that the state needed more people to develop, and the Great Pacific Railroad would not be achieved for years and years. It concluded though, "...the appearances at present are that the project will be ridden to death, as so many have made it a hobby by which they expect to mount to fame." This was followed by an article on a bill for importation of dromedaries and camels.

However, the Pacific Mail Steamship Company provided a regular mail service between San Francisco and New York that took about five weeks. Twice a month a steamer sailed from San Francisco to Panama City, while another sailed from New York to Chagres (Colón) on the other side of the isthmus of Panama. Passengers would cross the isthmus, a three day journey by canoe and mule, then take the waiting steamer to their destination. The Herald published special editions named the Steamer Herald or San Francisco Herald for the steamer. Presumably talking of the steamer edition, the Library of Congress says it was semimonthly, the masthead said "For circulation in the Atlantic States, Europe, South America, Sandwich Islands, Australia, and Islands of the Pacific.", and for each issue in 1859 the masthead named the packets that carried that issue.

== Duels ==
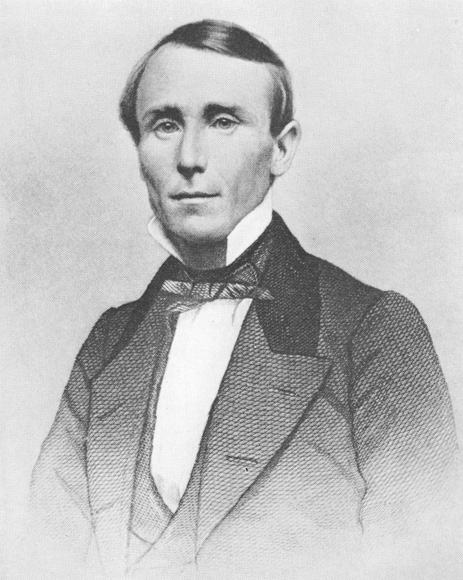
William Walker

William Walker gained national attention by dueling with law clerk William Hicks Graham on 12 January 1851. The cause was an article Walker had written in the Herald that criticized Graham's employer, Judge R.N. Morrison. Walker was hit twice in the leg and fell down, but his wounds were not serious. Three months late Walker wrote an article in the Herald that attacked judge Eli Parsons, who had told a grand jury "the press is a nuisance". Parsons had Walker arrested, brought to court and fined $500 for contempt of court. Walker refused to pay and the judge threw him in jail. Thousands of people demanded his release, and on appeal Parsons' decision was thrown out on the basis that the constitution protected freedom of the press.

Nugent was also involved in several duels. He fought and slightly wounded William H. Jones in 1852. A quarrel with Alderman John Cotter arose from the purchase of the Jonny Lind Theatre for use as a public building, which the Herald insinuated was fraudulent. Nogent accepted a duel with Cotter that took place in Contra Costa on 15 July 1852. The protagonists went there the night before. The next day at around 11:30 the steamboat arrived with the seconds and surgeons, friends and reporters. The duel took place at 2:30. Cotter's second shot produced a compound fracture in Nugent's left thigh, which fortunately healed quickly. In 1853 he dueled with Alderman Hayes over a comment about some land deals. They fought with rifles at twenty paces, in front of a crowd of spectators. On the second fire Nugent was severely wounded.

In March, 1854 Benjamin Franklin Washington, who at the time worked for the Times and Transcript, took offense at articles written in the San Francisco Herald. He challenged C. A. Washburn, then the editor of the San Francisco Herald, to a duel. Washington aimed to kill, but his second shot went through the rim of Washburn's hat, and his third bullet struck Washburn in the shoulder. The duel then ended.

== Decline and closure ==
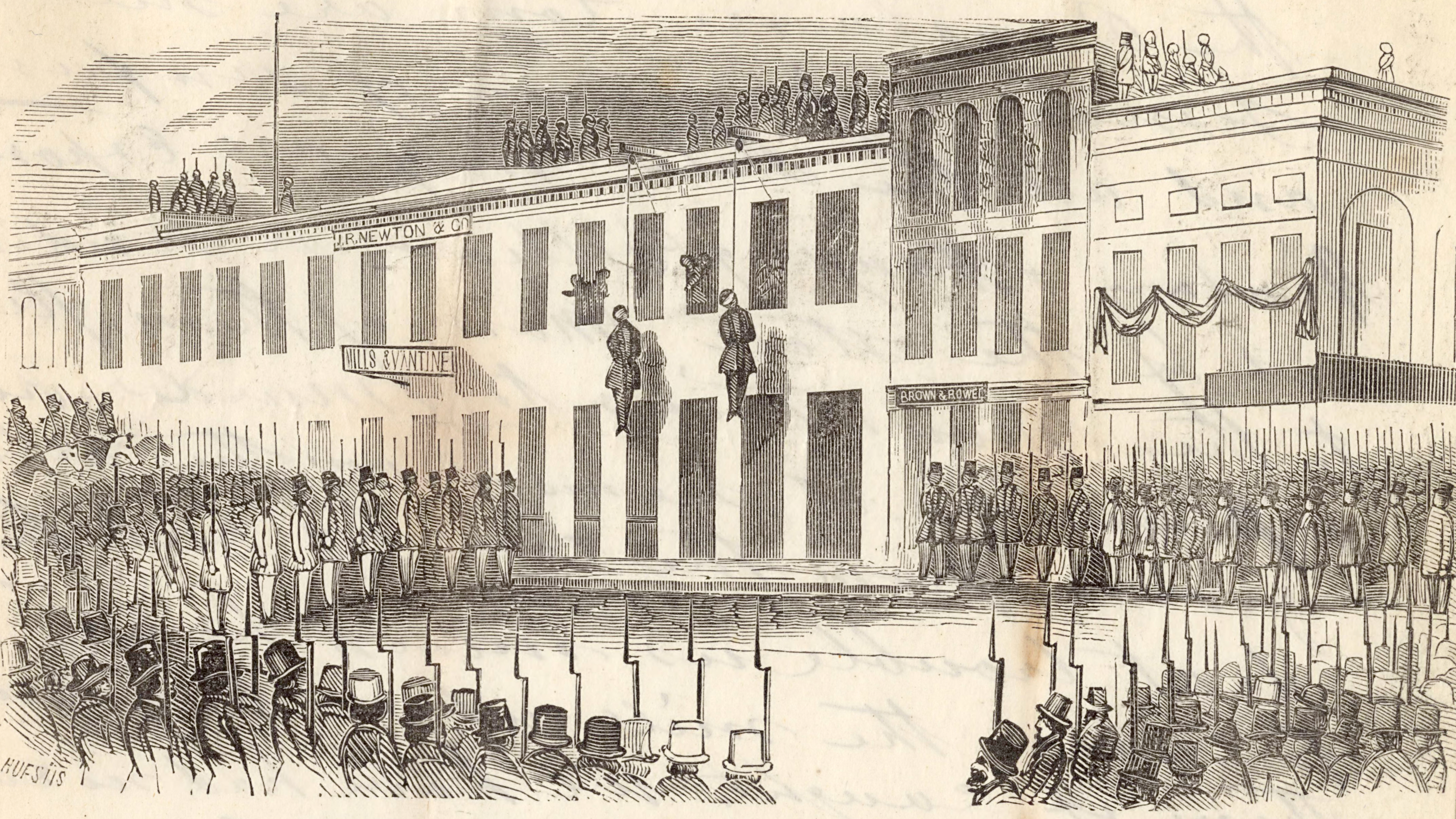
Lynching of James P. Casey and Charles Cora by the Vigilance Committee

In May 1856 James P. Casey of the city board of supervisors shot and killed James King of William, editor of the opposition newspaper The Evening Bulletin, for publishing an editorial that exposed Casey's criminal record in New York. This led to creation of the second San Francisco Committee of Vigilance. This was an extra-legal organization supported by businesses to take the law into their own hands. Nugent, a Democrat, opposed the vigilantes. The mainly Republican vigilantes were furious and nearly destroyed the newspaper by cancelling advertisements and subscriptions. (Note: Some prominent businessmen, such as Archibald Alexander Ritchie, supported Nugent in his opposition to the vigilance committee.) Copies of the Herald were burned in public. The Herald lost the auctioneer ads, and was at once reduced to a quarter of its former size. The Chronicle, which also opposed the committee, suffered equally. The Alta California received most of the business taken from the Herald and Chronicle, and became the leading morning paper.

After this the Herald became aligned with the Democrats, but never regained its leading position. Nugent stopped contributing to the paper regularly and started a new career as an attorney. As of 1858 the Herald was described as being on the verge of the newspaper grave. The San Francisco Herald was published by G.W. Guthrie & Co. from 1860 to 1862. It was succeeded by the Daily Herald and Mirror from 1862 to 1863. In 1869 Nugent revived the Herald, but it was short-lived.

== Sources ==
- Asbury, Herbert (2002), The Barbary Coast: An Informal History of the San Francisco Underworld, Basic Books
- Bancroft, Hubert Howe (1888), The Works of Hubert Howe Bancroft: California inter Pocula, Arno Press
- Burchell, Robert Arthur (1980), The San Francisco Irish, 1848-1880, University of California Press, ISBN 9780520040038
- Daggett, Emerson, ed. (1939), History of journalism in San Francisco (Writers' Program of the Work Projects Administration in Northern California: History of San Francisco Journalism Project), San Francisco
- Dando-Collins, Stephen (2009), Tycoon's War: How Cornelius Vanderbilt Invaded a Country to Overthrow America's Most Famous Military Adventurer, Hachette UK, ISBN 9780786731619
- Goerke-Shrode, Sabine (22 August 2004), Capt. Ritchie battles for his land holdings, Vacaville Heritage Council and Solano County Historical Society
- "John Rollin Ridge (1827-1867)". New Georgia Encyclopedia.
- Madley, Benjamin (2004), "Patterns of frontier genocide 1803–1910: the Aboriginal Tasmanians, the Yuki of California, and the Herero of Namibia" (PDF), Journal of Genocide Research, 6 (2 June), Carfax Publishing: 167–192, doi:10.1080/1462352042000225930, S2CID 145079658
- O'Meara, James (December 1915), "Joseph R. Walker" (PDF), The Quarterly of the Oregon Historical Society, 16 (4), Oregon Historical Society: 350–363, JSTOR 20610018
- Smith, Allan (1972). "Nugent, John". In Hayne, David (ed.). Dictionary of Canadian Biography. Vol. X (1871–1880) (online ed.). University of Toronto Press.
- Tiemann, Jonathan (July 2018), Contagion 1855: How the Crimean War Felled San Francisco's Largest Banks (PDF), Tiemann Investment Advisors LLC
- Tinkham, George H. (1915), "14, "PULPIT, PRESS AND PUBLIC SCHOOL"", California Men and Events
- The San Francisco Herald (San Francisco, Calif.) 1851-1860, Library of Congress
- The San Francisco Herald (San Francisco, Calif.) 1856-1862, Library of Congress
- Thrapp, Dan L. (1991), Encyclopedia of Frontier Biography, vol. G–O, U of Nebraska Press, ISBN 0803294190
