= Cedar Lawn =

Historic house in West Virginia, United States

- U.S. National Register of Historic Places
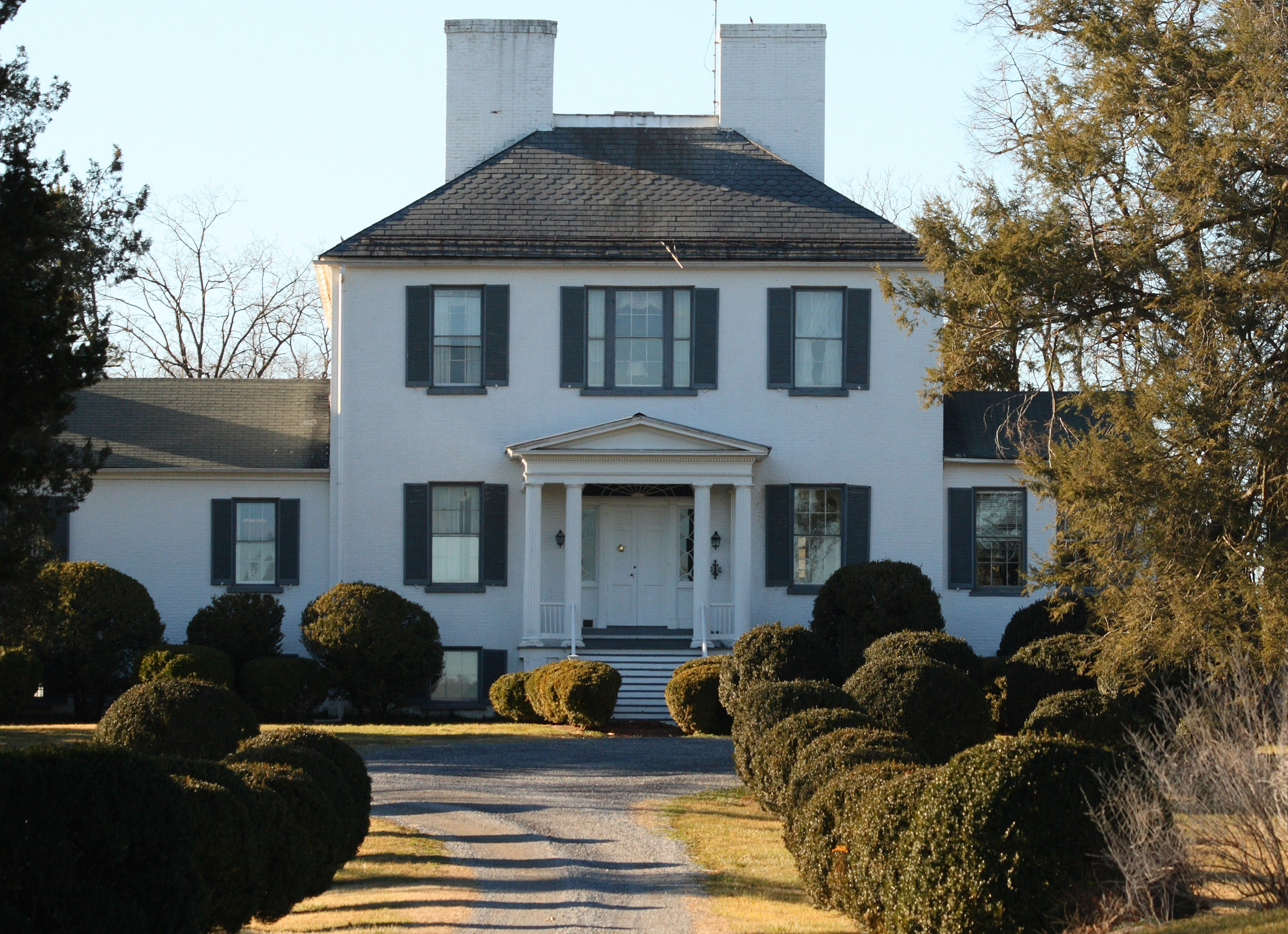

- Location within West Virginia Location within the United States
- Location: Charles Town, West Virginia
- Coordinates: 39°17′6″N 77°55′22″W
- Built: 1825
- Architectural style: Federal
- NRHP reference No.: 74002004
- Added to NRHP: December 4, 1974

Cedar Lawn, also known as Berry Hill and Poplar Hill, is one of several houses built near Charles Town, West Virginia for members of the Washington family. Cedar Lawn was built in 1825 for John Thornton Augustine Washington, George Washington's grand-nephew. The property was originally part of the Harewood estate belonging to Samuel Washington. The property that eventually became Cedar Lawn was left to Samuel's son, Thornton Washington, who built "Berry Hill", named for his wife's family. Berry Hill was destroyed by fire, and John Thornton Augustine built Cedar Lawn when he inherited.

In the 1940s, the house was bought by R.J. Funkhouser, an industrialist who had a taste for Washington family estates, who also owned Blakeley and Claymont Court. The property remains in the Funkhouser family and is known as O'Sullivan Farms, after Funkhouser's principal venture, the O'Sullivan Corporation.

== Description ==
Cedar Lawn was built shortly after Claymont Court, using a plan and elevations similar to Hazelfield, adapted with a hipped roof. The two story three bay brick house is set on a raised basement. A Greek Revival front porch was added later in the nineteenth century.

== See also ==
- Happy Retreat
