= Harewood (West Virginia) =

Historic house in West Virginia, United States

- U.S. National Register of Historic Places
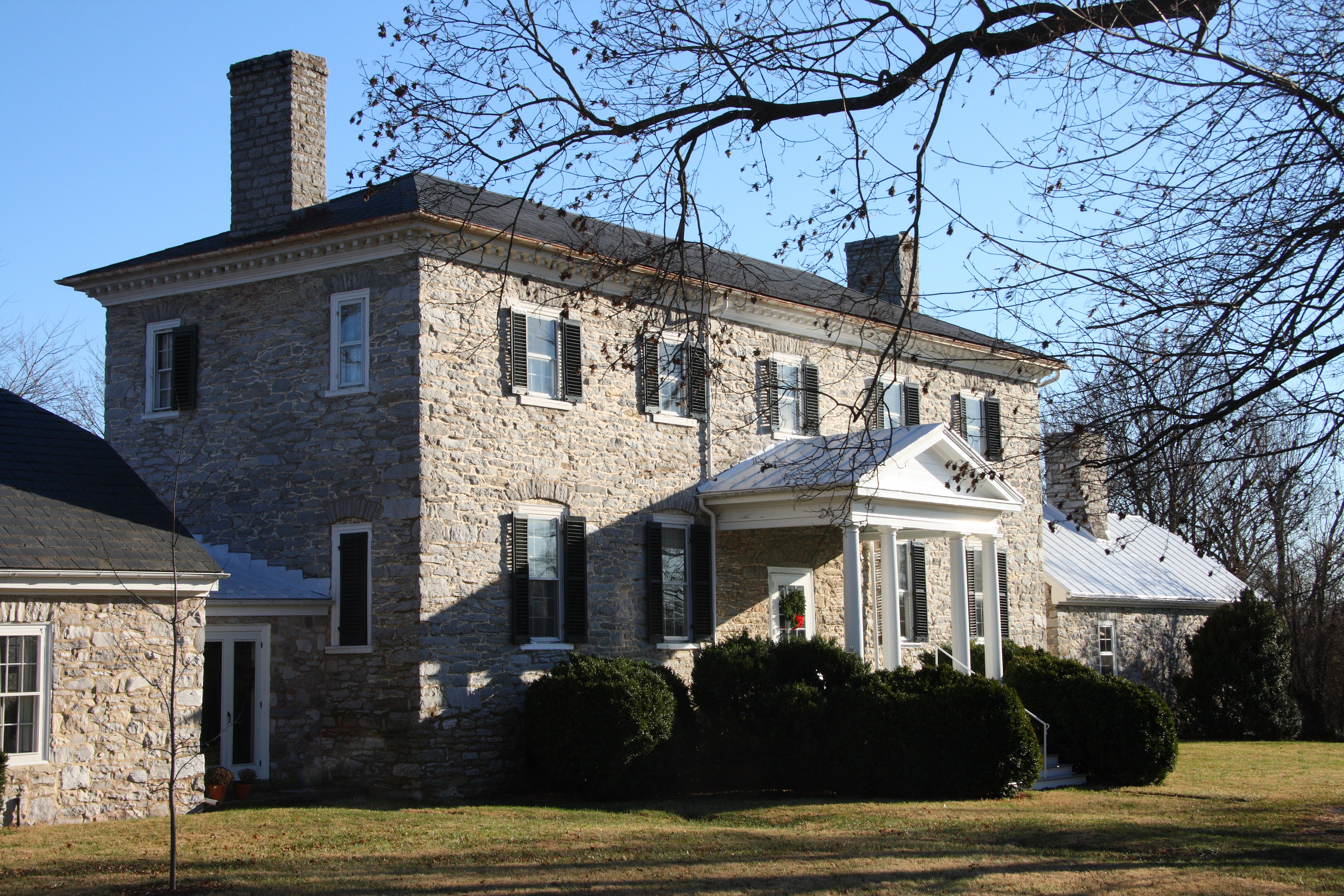
- Harewood, December 2008

- Location within West Virginia Location within the United States
- Location: Jefferson County, West Virginia, USA
- Nearest city: Charles Town, West Virginia
- Coordinates: 39°18′10″N 77°54′56″W
- Architect: Ariss, John
- Architectural style: Georgian
- NRHP reference No.: 73001909
- Added to NRHP: March 14, 1973

Harewood is one of several houses in the vicinity of Charles Town, West Virginia built for members of the Washington family.

== Description ==
The house was designed by John Ariss for Samuel Washington in 1770, using a center-hall, single-pile plan. The two-story limestone house has a raised basement and flanking stone wings. Exterior details are simple, with only a modillioned cornice at the eaves of the shallow hipped roof. The interior is detailed in the manner of the Tidewater-region houses that Washington and Arris were familiar with. Interior detailing is extensive with Doric pilasters in the main downstairs rooms.

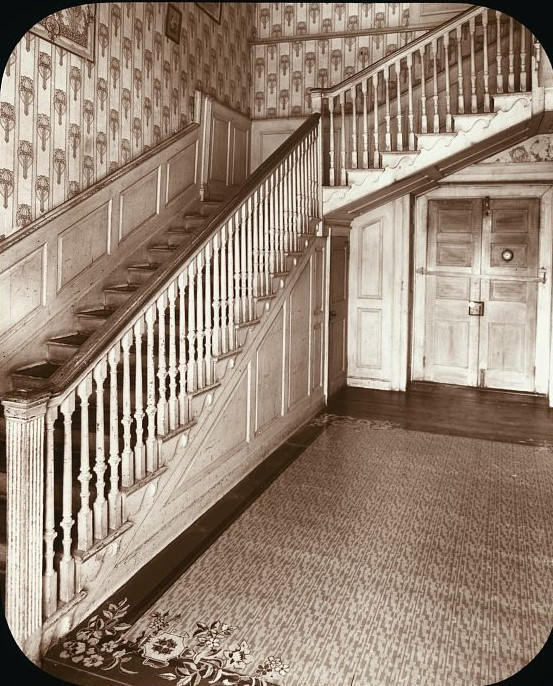
"Harewood," Samuel Washington house, designed by John Ariss in 1770, photographed by Frances Benjamin Johnston, ca. 1930s

== History ==
Samuel Washington moved to Harewood from his farm on Chotank Creek in Stafford County, Virginia to Harewood, accumulating 3,800 acres (15 km^{2}) by the time he died in 1781.

George Washington visited the house several times, and its interior features a marble fireplace reportedly given to George Washington by the Marquis de Lafayette.

After Samuel Washington's death, it was inherited by his son George Steptoe Washington, whose sister-in-law Dolley Payne Todd married future President James Madison in the house on September 15, 1794. Another of Samuel's sons, Thornton Washington, built Cedar Lawn nearby. During the American Civil War, James Taylor (who accompanied Union troops in the area) sketched it and noted the luxury of its interior compared with the relatively plain late Georgian style exterior. During the 1930s, photographs of the interior were taken by the Historic American Buildings Survey.

== Present status ==
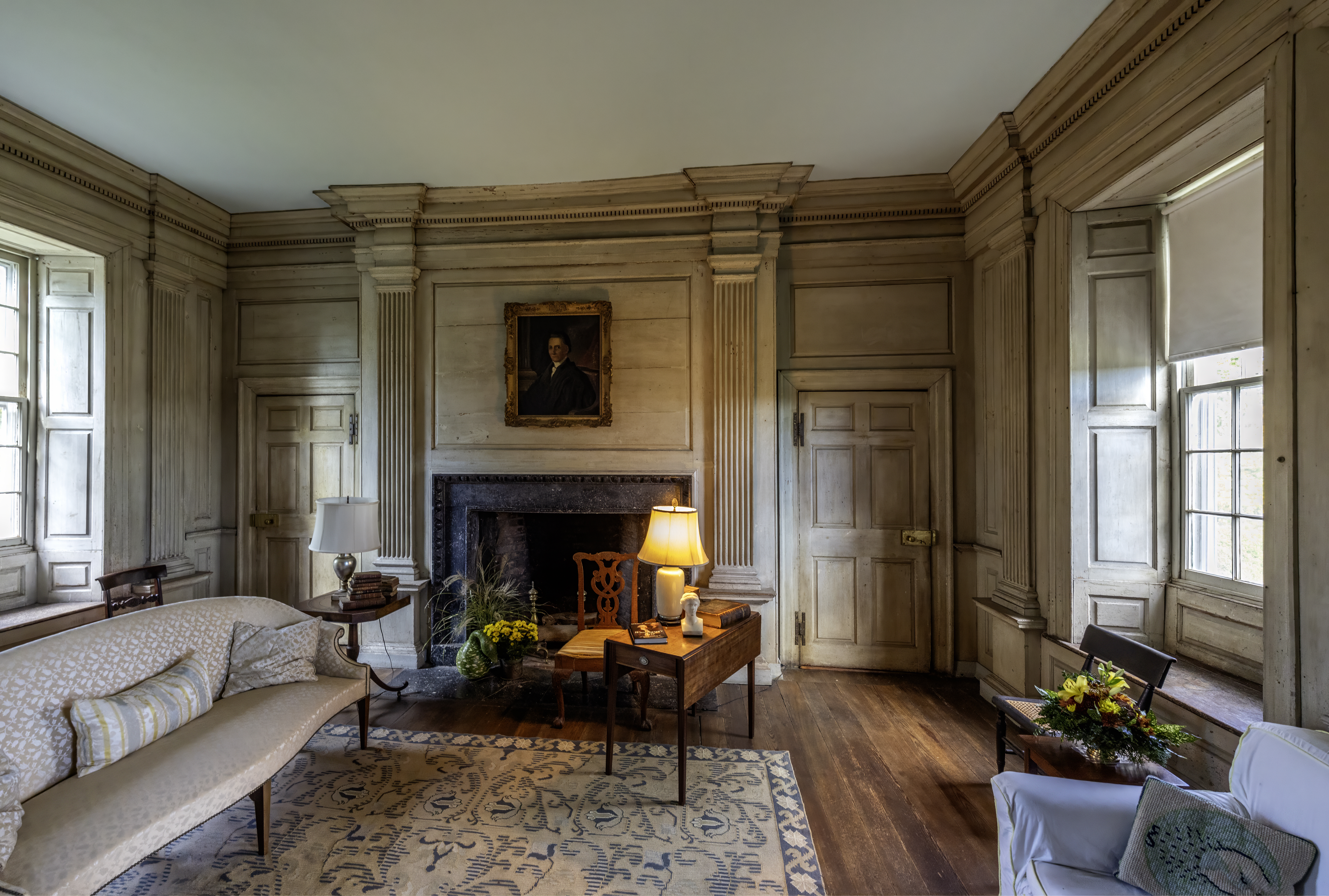
The parlor in 2025

The oldest surviving Washington family house in Jefferson County also is the only one still owned by members of the extended Washington family. Modern archeological excavations of a graveyard at Harewood noted that some remains were moved to the Zion Episcopal Churchyard in Charles Town in 1882, and have identified the remains of Lucy Payne (wife of George Steptoe Washington) and two of Samuel Washington's grandsons.

== See also ==
- Blakeley (West Virginia)
- Cedar Lawn
- Claymont Court
- Happy Retreat
