= Bullskin Run =

Stream in West Virginia, U.S.

Coordinates: 39°12′37″N 77°49′45″W

Bullskin Run is a stream in the U.S. state of West Virginia.

Bullskin Run probably derives its name from the buffaloes which once roamed the area.

== See also ==
- List of rivers of West Virginia
