= Coat of arms of the Washington family =

One of the official symbols of the Washington family

- Shield

Versions
- Full achievement
- Armiger: Washington
- Crest: From a crest coronet a raven rising wings elevated and addorsed proper.
- Shield: Argent two bars Gules, in chief three mullets of the second.
- Motto: Exitus acta probat (The outcome is the test of the act)

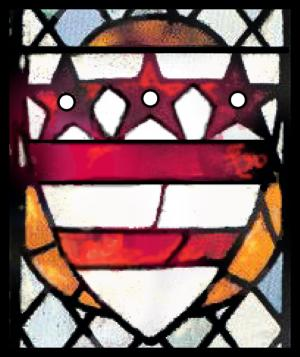
Selby Abbey, England

Flag of the District of Columbia

The crest of the Washington Army National Guard — pictured above — uses the raven and coronet from George Washington's crest.

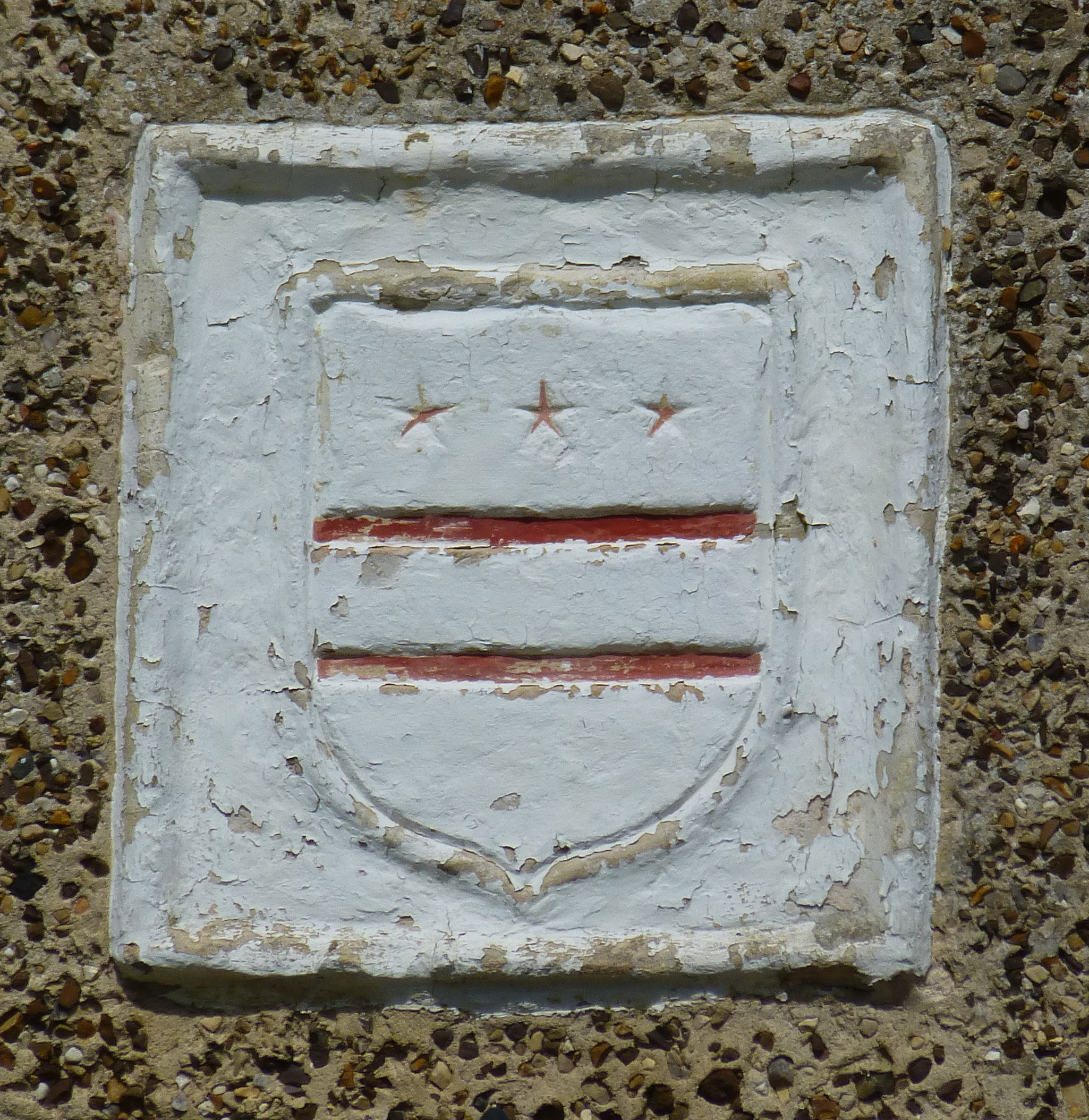
Sulgrave Manor, England

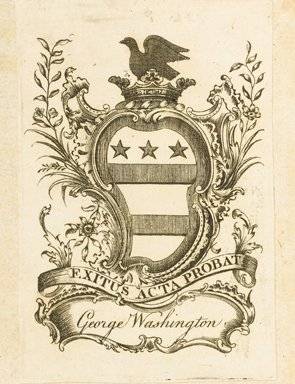
George Washington bookplate

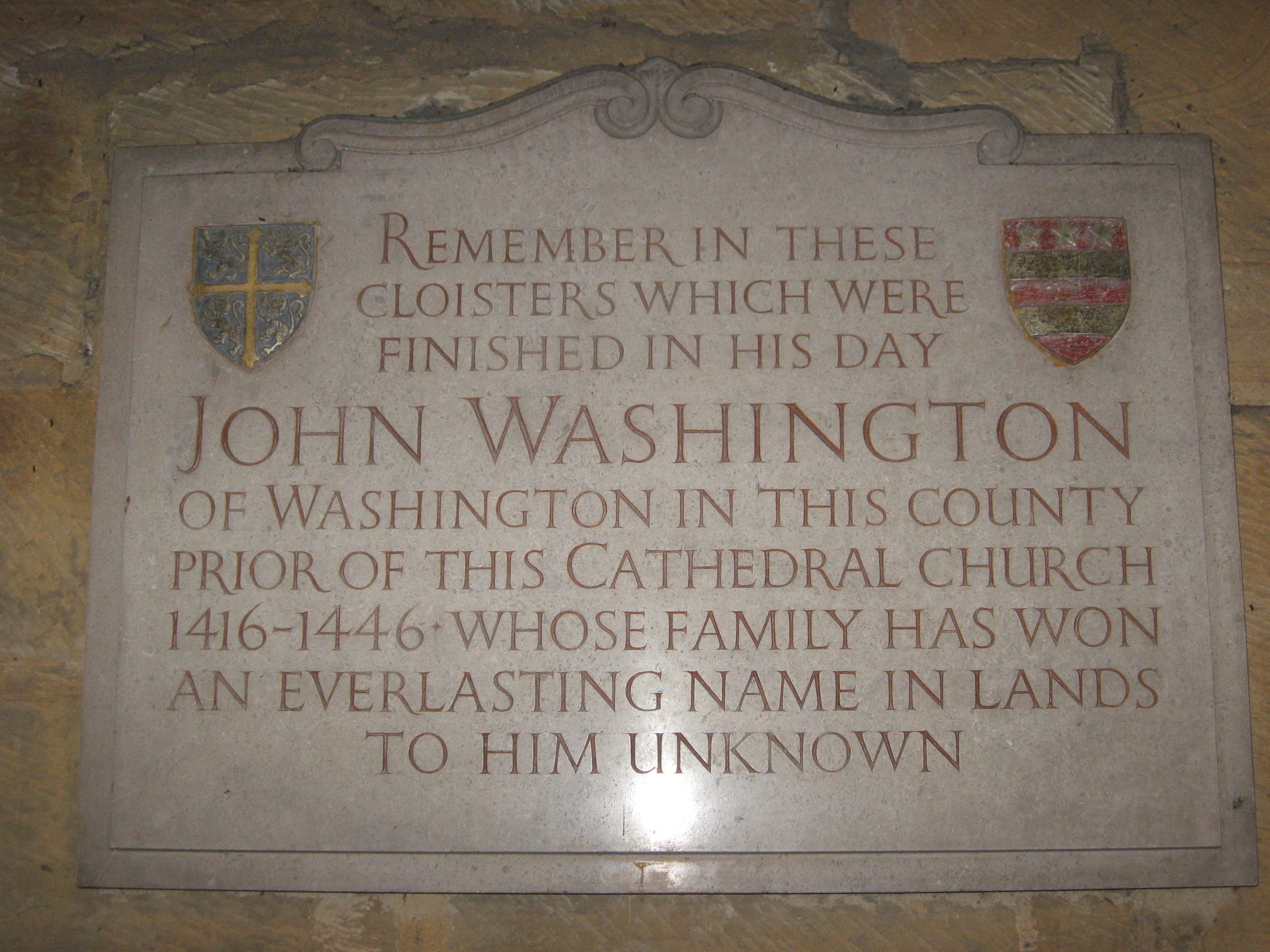
Durham Cathedral cloisters, England

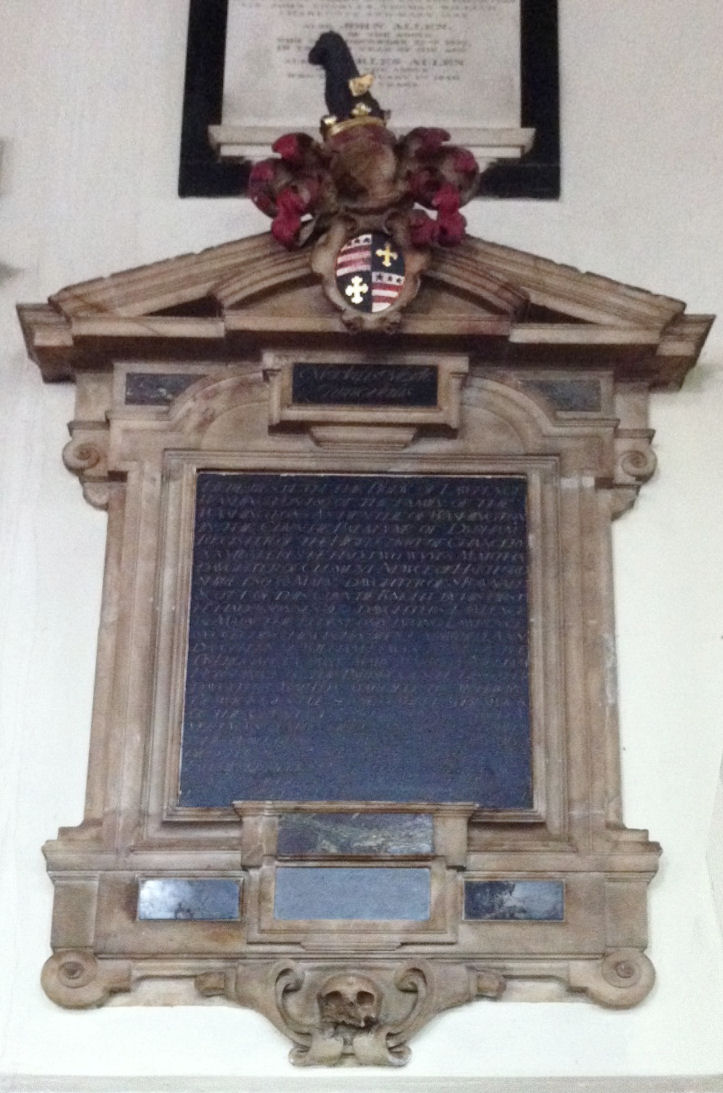
Maidstone, England

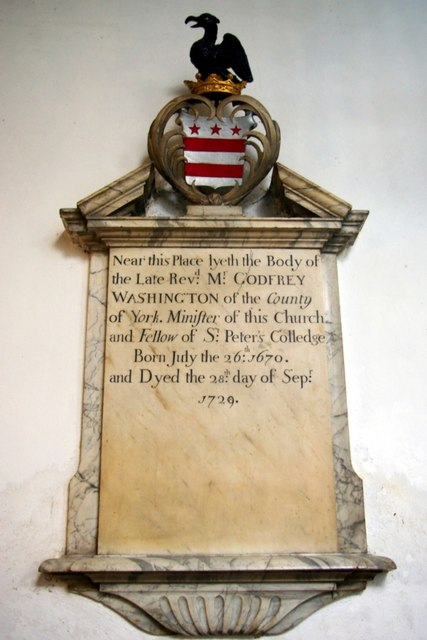
Godfrey Washington's monument in Little St Mary's, Cambridge

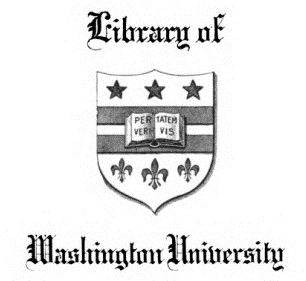
Washington University Seal

The first coat of arms of a member of the Washington family is first documented in the 14th century, borne by one of the male Washington family members of Washington Old Hall in County Durham, England.

The design (three red stars over two horizontal red bars on a white field) has been used since 1938 as the basis for the coat of arms and flag of the District of Columbia. It is also found on the Purple Heart, a US medal for wounded soldiers.

These elements have also been said to have inspired the "stars and stripes" design of the Flag of the United States. However, despite some visual similarity, there is "little evidence" or "no evidence whatsoever" to support the claimed connection. The Digital Encyclopedia of George Washington, published by the Fred W. Smith National Library for the Study of George Washington at Mount Vernon, calls it an "enduring myth" backed by "no discernible evidence." Instead, the story seems to have originated in the 1876 play Washington: A Drama in Five Acts, by the English poet Martin Farquhar Tupper, and was further popularized through repetition in the children's magazine St. Nicholas.

== History ==
The Washington family traces its roots to Sir William de Hertburn who was granted the lordship of Wessyngton in northeast England and adopted the name of the estate. The early arms showed a lion rampant in 1203. In 1346, a new design with two horizontal bars below three mullets, though with the tinctures reversed from the later arms, is recorded for Sir William de Hertburn/de Wessyngton's great-grandson. At the end of the 14th century, the current design is recorded. The family scattered in various parts of the country over the next century. One branch of the family, which later moved to the Colony of Virginia, settled in Northamptonshire, England. In 1592, Robert Cook, Clarenceux King of Arms confirms upon Lawrence Washington of Sulgrave Manor the current coat of arms.

In a letter dated 7 December 1791, George Washington received the confirmation from Sir Isaac Heard, Garter Principal King of Arms of the College of Arms in London. He responds that "the arms are the same that are held here by certain ancestral family member." The President used the coat of arms in many places around his home at Mount Vernon including on several personal items as well as on the livery uniforms of his servants, as this was a common practice prior to the American Revolution among wealthy plantation owners.

It was the first coat of arms recorded in the Committee on Heraldry of the New England Historic Genealogical Society's Roll of Arms.

== Variations and similar arms ==
Some authorities in the twelfth century displayed the arms with the colours reversed (gules two bars argent, in chief three mullets of the second). An almost identical coat of arms was used by the Le Moyne family, who were described as landowners at Grafham in Huntingdonshire in the reign of Henry II. Their arms were: "Argent, two bars Sable, in chief three mullets of the second", with only the colour of the mullets and bars being different. The Washington University in St. Louis seal, developed in 1896, uses elements from George Washington's coat of arms.

== Other uses ==
The flag of Washington, D.C. shares the same design as George Washington's arms. George Washington's coat of arms can also be found on the Purple Heart decoration awarded by the United States Armed Forces. The crest (the topmost element in a display of heraldry, atop the helmet) in Washington's coat of arms is used as the crest of the Washington Army National Guard.

== Architectural occurrences ==
- The oldest surviving occurrence may be a stained glass window in the Old Library of Trinity College, Oxford. The window is believed to have been moved from what was the chapel of Durham College, Oxford. Durham College was created for the training of Benedictine monks from Durham Abbey. Durham College was disestablished by Henry VIII. Sir Thomas Pope purchased the site in 1555 and used it for the creation of Trinity College. Henry the VIII attainted the Washington family by guilt of association from two associates that committed violations against the King.
- The Washington Window in Selby Abbey, in the British market town of Selby, contains a variant of the Washington coat of arms in the original 14th-century stained glass. It is thought to be a benefaction to the abbey to commemorate John Wessington, Prior of Durham (1416–1446). The arms are distinguished from the usual Washington arms by having pierced mullets.
- The Washington coat of arms can be seen at the parish church in Garsdon, near Malmesbury, Wiltshire, where a branch of the family moved in Tudor times. A Washington memorial accompanies it.
- The Washington coat of arms is engraved in stone in the porch of an ancient church in the tiny Dorset hamlet of Steeple, a church that incidentally lacks a steeple. The Washington coat of arms is also painted in scarlet on the roof interior, quartered with those of the squires of Steeple village, the Lawrence family, who are allied with the Washingtons by the marriage of one of its sons, Edmund Lawrence to Agnes de Wessington in 1390.
- The Washington coat of arms is engraved in stone inside a side room in the church in the small Lancashire village of Warton (near Carnforth), near a pub named the George Washington. The flag of the US capital hangs prominently in the church, presented on 25 July 1977 by Walter E. Washington (no relation), mayor of Washington, D.C., from 2 January 1975 – 2 January 1979
- The Washington coat of arms can be seen (with the colours reversed) on a memorial to John Wessington in the cloisters of Durham Cathedral, where he was Prior.
- The Washington coat of arms is engraved in stone in the parish church of Thrapston in Northamptonshire. George Washington's ancestor, Sir John Washington, was mayor of the town in the seventeenth century.
- The Washington coat of arms can be seen with many other coats of arms in a stained glass window in St Laurence Church in Chorley, said to be the birthplace of Myles Standish.
- The Washington coat of arms can be seen in stone in the parish church of St John in Wickhamford, Worcestershire, on the grave of Penelope Washington, whose father, Colonel Henry Washington, was the first cousin of George Washington's grandfather Lawrence. The coat of arms is lozenge-shaped, as is the custom for women in England.
- The Washington coat of arms can be seen in stone on the outside of Hylton Castle, Sunderland, an 11th-century fortified manor house.
- The Washington coat of arms appears in a memorial to Lawrence Washington (died 1619), great-uncle of Lawrence Washington, great-great-grandfather of George Washington, in All Saints Church, Maidstone.
- The Washington coat of arms can be seen in a memorial window in All Saints' Church in Maldon, Essex, where Lawrence Washington was buried in the graveyard.
- The Washington coat of arms is engraved in stone on the tomb of the first Lawrence Washington (died 1619) in the chancel of Great Brington's parish church of St Mary.
- The Washington coat of arms is placed prominently above the entrance door at Sulgrave Manor in Northamptonshire, the home built in 1560 by Lawrence Washington (d. 1584) George Washington's direct ancestor. The family coat of arms can also be seen in stained glass panels in the Great Hall which show marriage arms of several families that married into the Washington family. These are copies of the original stained glass windows, which were moved into the Church of St Mary the Virgin, Fawsley.
- The Washington coat of arms, quartered with that of Kitson, whose family married into that of Washington, can be seen in a stained glass window in Hengrave Hall in Suffolk.
- The Washington coat of arms appears with many other coats of arms in the main east stained glass window of St Martin's Church, Bowness-on-Windermere (Cumbria), in the fifth light from the left, on the top row.
- The Washington coat of arms appears in stone on the grave of a James Washington (d. 1580) in the north chapel of the parish church of Saint Laurence in Adwick le Street, South Yorkshire, where he was lord of the manor. However, there is no proven ancestral link between him and George Washington.
- Reverend Godfrey Washington, the great-uncle of George Washington, who died on 28 September 1729 is buried in Little St Mary's Church, Cambridge. His memorial is on the north wall close to the main door.

== See also ==
- Flag of Washington, D.C., the banner of arms of this coat
- United States Heraldry
