= Washington family =

Colonial American family

Washington
- Washington coat of arms

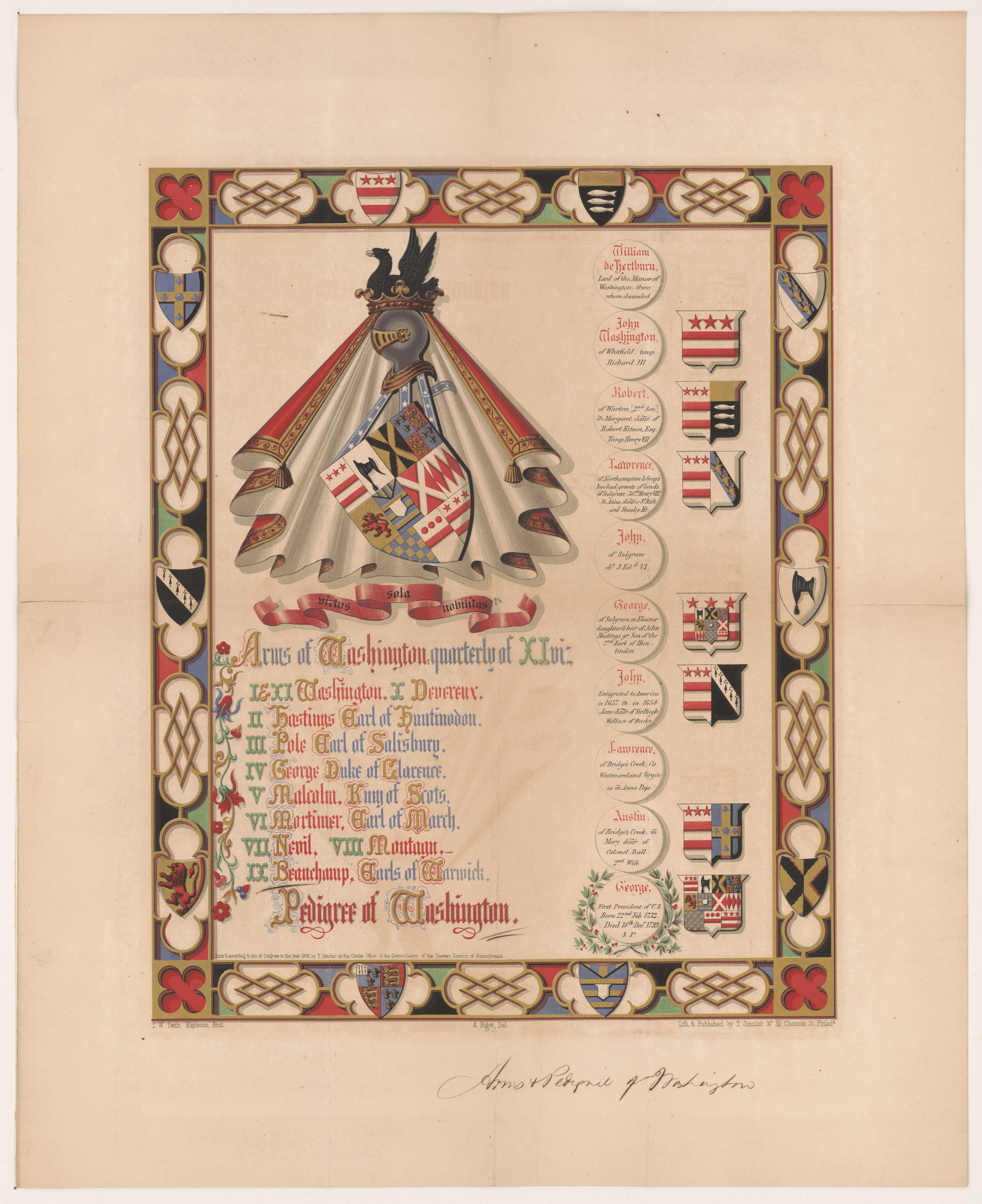
- Pedigree and arms of the Washington line until George Washington
- Current region: Colony of Virginia
- Earlier spellings: de Washington; earlier, de Wessyington
- Etymology: Derives from Wessington (Washington) in County Durham
- Origin: Washington Old Hall, England
- Founded: 12th century
- Traditions: Anglicanism
- Motto: Exitus acta probat (Latin) (The outcome is the test of the act)
- Estate: List: Washington Old Hall, Mount Vernon, Abingdon (plantation), Arlington House, Beall-Air, Blakeley (West Virginia), Blenheim (Wakefield Corner, Virginia), Bushfield (Mount Holly, Virginia), Cedar Lawn, Claymont Court, Germantown White House, Fairfield (Berryville, Virginia), Ferry Farm, Harewood (West Virginia), Kenmore (Fredericksburg, Virginia), River Farm, Sulgrave Manor, Tudor Place, Washington Bottom Farm, George Washington Birthplace, Mary Ball Washington House, White House (plantation), Woodlawn (Alexandria, Virginia)

The Washington family is an American family of English origins that was part of both the British landed gentry and the American gentry. It was prominent in colonial America and rose to great economic and political eminence especially in the Colony of Virginia as part of the planter class, owning several highly valued plantations, mostly making their money in tobacco farming. Members of the family include the first president of the United States, George Washington (1732–1799), and his nephew, Bushrod Washington (1762–1829), who served as Associate Justice of the Supreme Court of the United States.

The family's roots can be traced back to the 12th century in Washington, in the historic County Palatine of Durham now part of Sunderland in Tyne and Wear, in north-east England, where their ancestral home was Washington Old Hall. In the 16th century, a branch settled at Sulgrave Manor in Northamptonshire. John Washington, born 1631 in Tring, Hertfordshire, England, arrived in the Colony of Virginia in 1657 after being shipwrecked.

== Roots in Britain ==
The family are descended from Crínán "the Thane" of Dunkeld (d.1045), lay abbot and son-in-law of Malcolm II of Scotland. In 1183, his descendant Sir William de Hertburn (originally William Bayard) traded his manor of Hertburn (modern-day Hartburn) for that of Wessyington in County Durham near the River Wear. According to post-Conquest noble custom, his family adopted the name of the estate as an Anglo-Norman surname, "de Wessyington", which later became "Washington". Wessyington was an Old English placename and probably refers to the estate of a man named Wassa. On this site were relics of Saint Cuthbert, transferred to Durham from its shrine at Lindisfarne, as a saint invoked in combat against the Scots (compare Kirkcudbrightshire), and a symbol of the importance, privileges, and feudal obligations of the illustrious Bishop of Durham and his vassals, including the Washingtons.

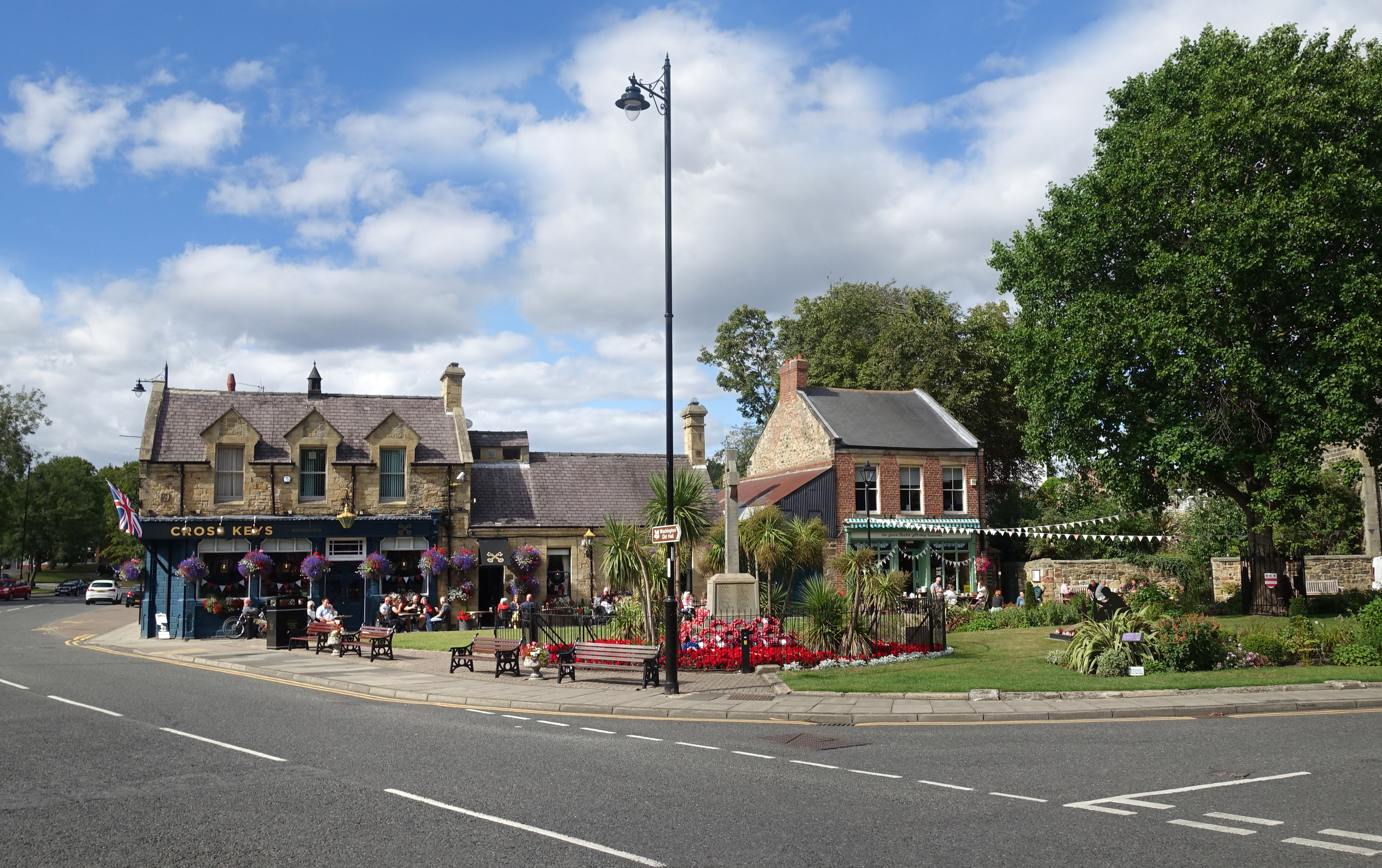
The old Washington green, the ancestral settlement of the Washingtons

The Washington family held the manor house at Washington Old Hall from 1180 to 1613, as part of the landed gentry of the County Palatine of Durham. John Wessington was prior of Durham Cathedral from 1416 to 1446.

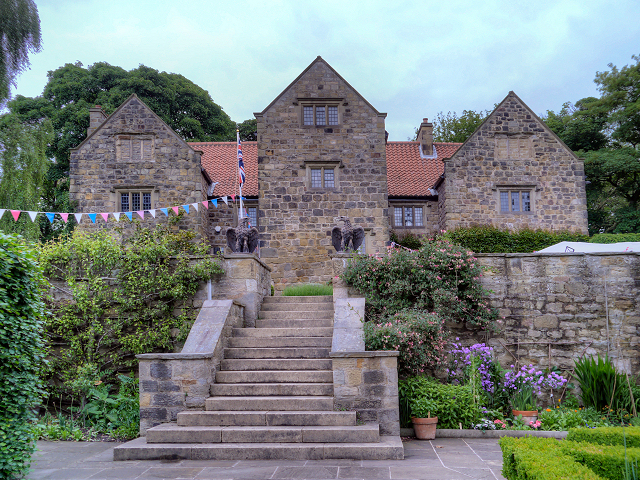
Old Hall, the Washington ancestral home

In the early 14th century, Robert de Washington, a descendant of William de Wessyngton, settled in Warton, Lancashire. Lawrence Washington, a descendant of Robert, moved from Warton to Northamptonshire in 1529, where he became a prosperous wool merchant. He acquired Sulgrave Manor, formerly owned by St Andrew's Priory, Northampton, during the dissolution of the monasteries and constructed a new manor house there.

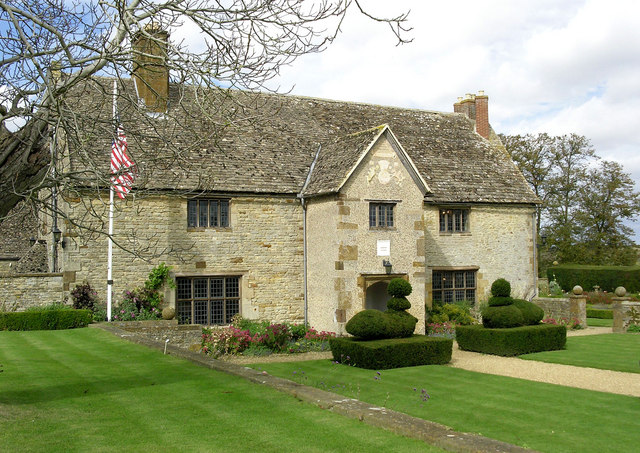
Sulgrave Manor, the house built by Lawrence Washington

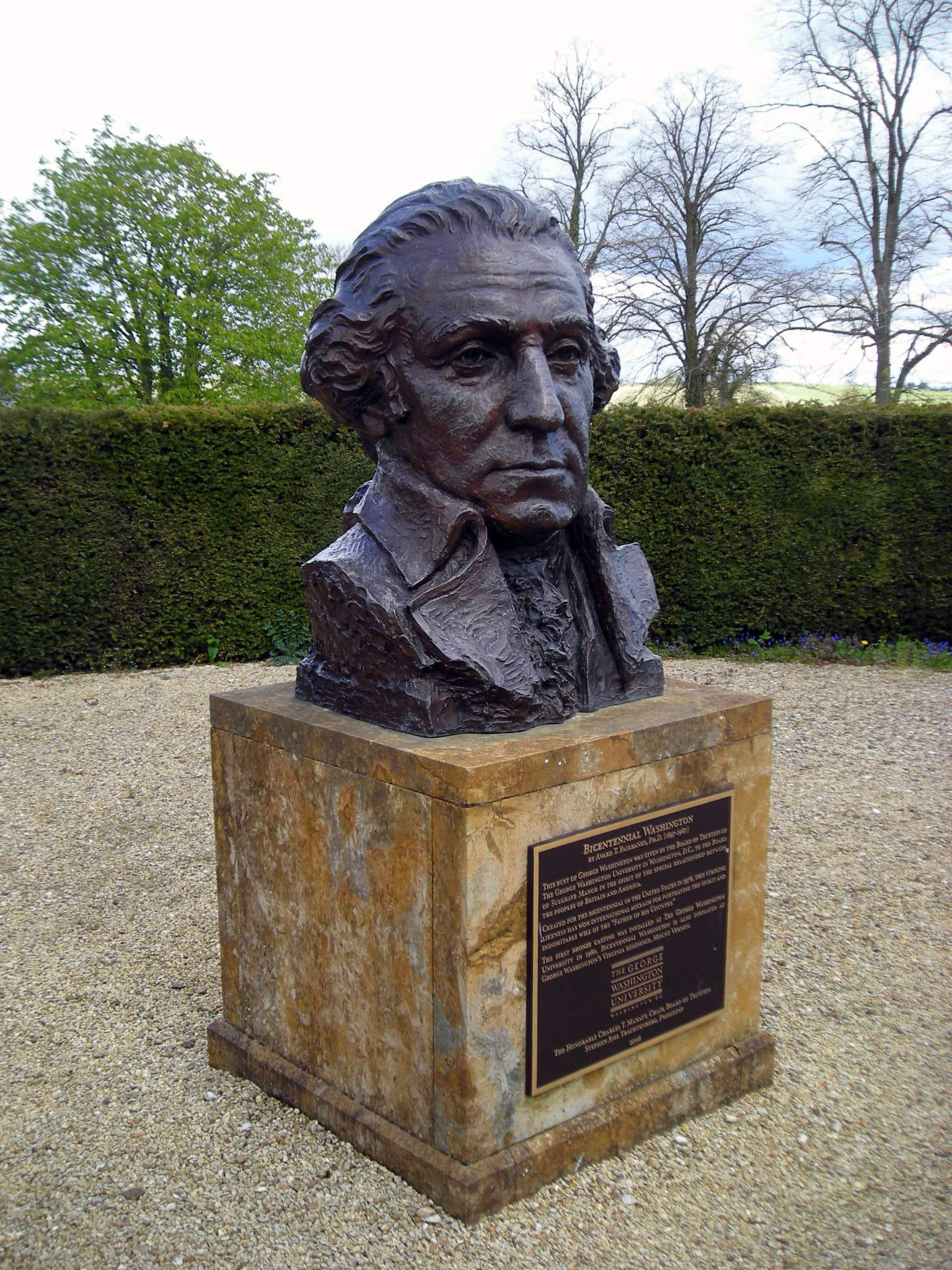
Bust of George Washington at Sulgrave Manor

Sulgrave Manor was completed in 1560 and remained in the Washington family until 1610.

Lawrence Washington's great-grandson, Lawrence Washington (1602–1652), was a rector. His brother Sir William Washington married the half-sister of George Villiers, 1st Duke of Buckingham. The Washington family supported the Royalists during the English Civil War and were dispossessed of their lands following their defeat. This may have motivated Lawrence's son, John Washington, to leave England and seek better prospects in America.

== History in America ==
=== First generation ===
The Washington family arrived in the Colony of Virginia in 1657, when John Washington was shipwrecked. John sailed on the ship the Seahorse. He was a planter, soldier, and politician in colonial Virginia in North America and a lieutenant colonel in the local militia. He settled in Westmoreland County, Virginia.

John Washington married Anne Pope in 1658 and had the following children: Lawrence Washington (the paternal grandfather of President George Washington), John Washington Jr. and Anne Washington. There were two additional children, names unknown, mentioned as deceased when he wrote his will on September 21, 1675. Anne Pope was the daughter of Englishman Nathaniel Pope and Lucy Fox.

=== Second generation ===
The family, especially Lawrence Washington, rose to great economic prominence, especially in regard to real estate, owning several plantations, mostly for tobacco cultivation. Lawrence married Mildred Warner in 1686 and had three children, John Washington III (1692–1746), Augustine (1694–1743) and Mildred (1698–1747). Mildred Warner (1671–1701) was a daughter of Augustine Warner Jr. and Mildred Reade. Her paternal grandparents were English settlers Augustine Warner Sr. and Mary Towneley.

Lawrence died at age 38 in February 1698 at Warner Hall, Gloucester County, Colony of Virginia, in the same year his daughter was born. Following his death, Mildred Warner Washington married George Gale, who moved the family to Whitehaven, England, where Mildred died in 1701 aged 30 following a difficult childbirth.

=== Third generation ===
Augustine Washington was born at Bridges Creek plantation in Westmoreland County, Virginia, in 1694, to Capt. Lawrence Washington and Mildred Warner. Augustine married twice; his second marriage in 1730 to Mary Ball produced the following six children: George (eldest and first president of the United States), Elizabeth "Betty", Samuel, John, Charles and Mildred Washington.

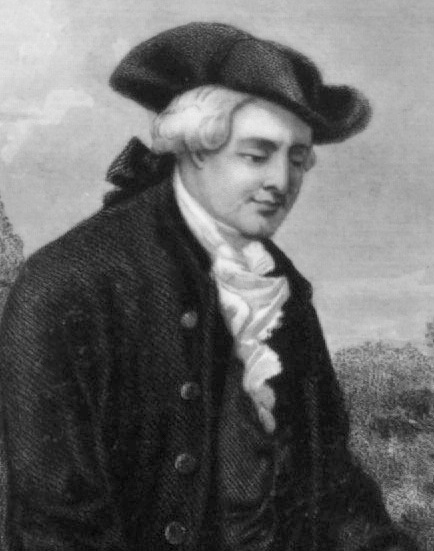
Augustine Washington

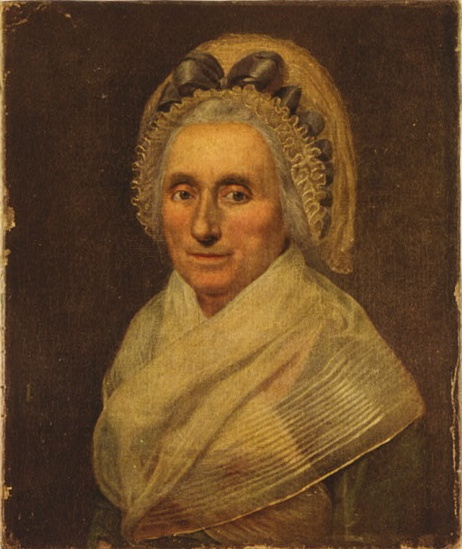
Mary Ball

Mary Ball (born c. 1707) was raised in the family Epping Forest Estate, the only child of Joseph Ball (1649–1711), an English justice, vestryman, lieutenant colonel and burgess in the Colony of Virginia, and Mary Johnson (1672–1721).

The Washington family owned land (on the banks of the Potomac River in Fairfax County, Virginia) since the time of Augustine's grandfather John Washington in 1674. Around 1734, Augustine brought his second wife Mary and children to the plantation called Little Hunting Creek when George was about two years old. Augustine began on an expansion of the family home that continued under their son George, who began leasing the Mount Vernon estate in 1754, becoming its sole owner in 1761.

=== Fourth generation ===
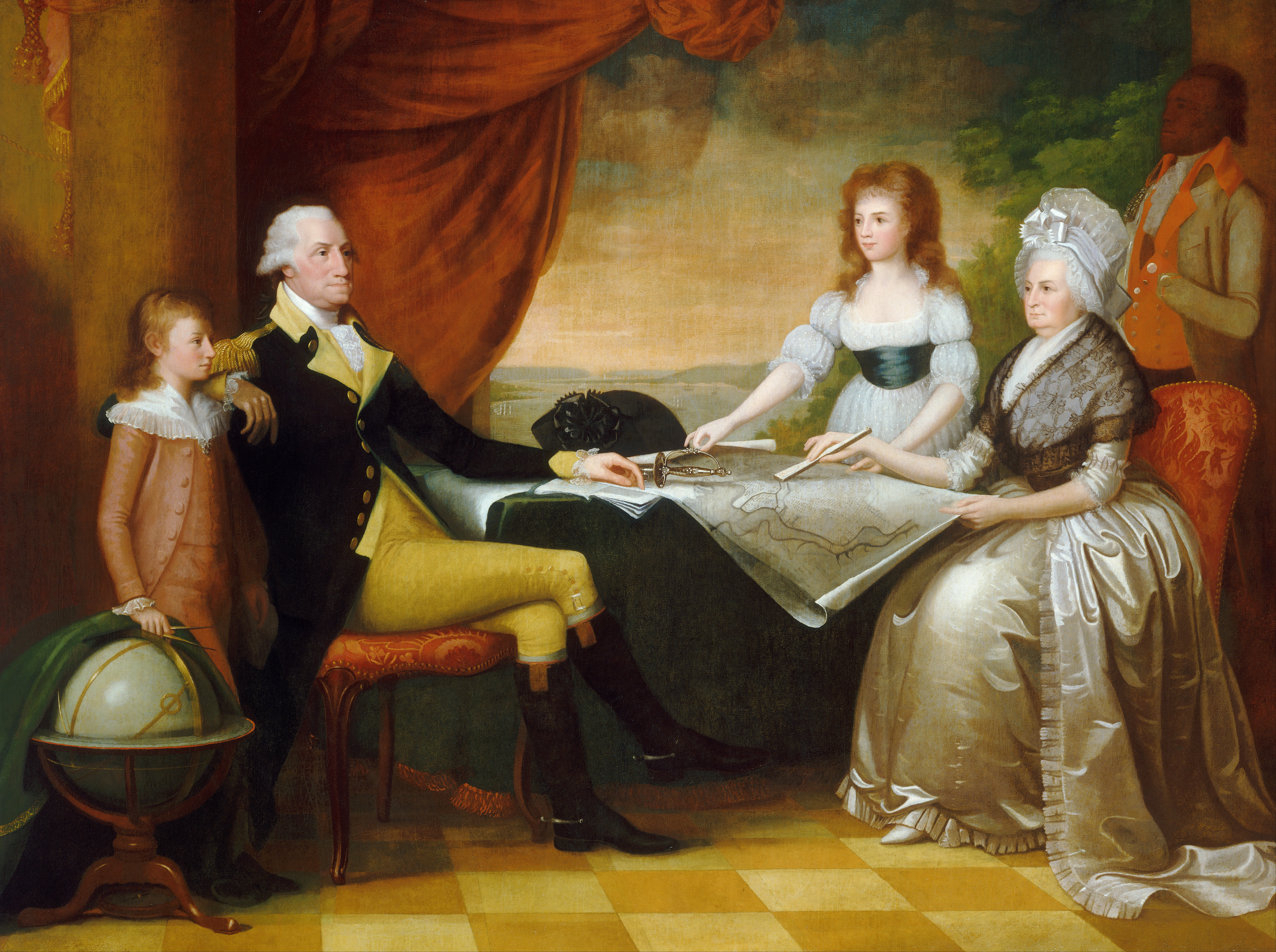
The Washington Family (1789–1796) by Edward Savage

George Washington was born on February 22, 1732, at Popes Creek, Virginia, British America and the oldest of six children to Augustine and Mary Washington. He became an American political leader, military general and Founding Father who served as the first president of the United States from 1789 to 1797. Washington died December 14, 1799, age 67, at Mount Vernon, the family's estate in Virginia. Washington had no biological children. His wife Martha Dandridge had four children from her first marriage to Daniel Parke Custis (1711–1757) - Daniel Custis (1751–1754), Frances Custis (1753–1757), John "Jacky" Parke Custis (1754–1781) and Martha "Patsy" Parke Custis (1756–1773). Washington was the stepfather of the youngest 2 children.

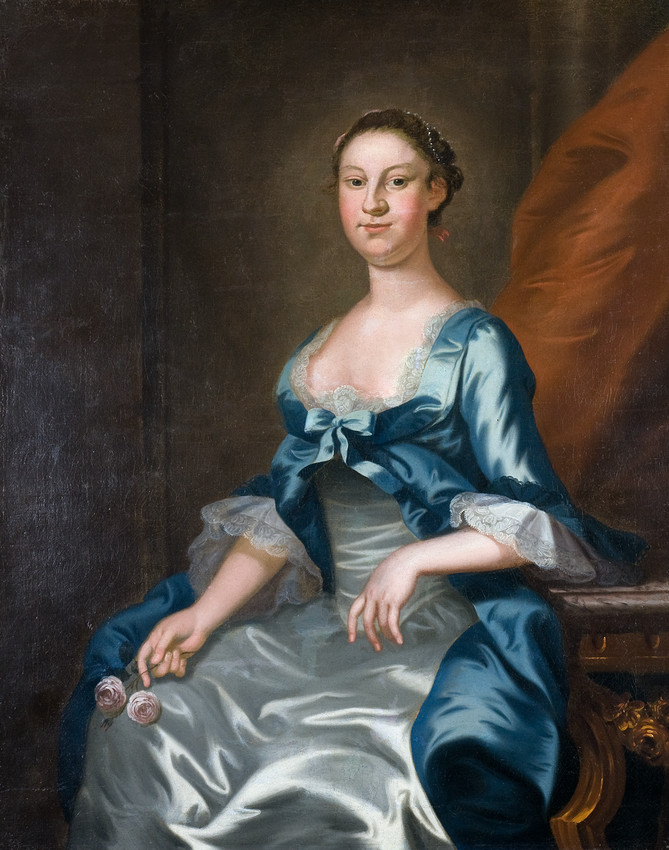
Betty Washington

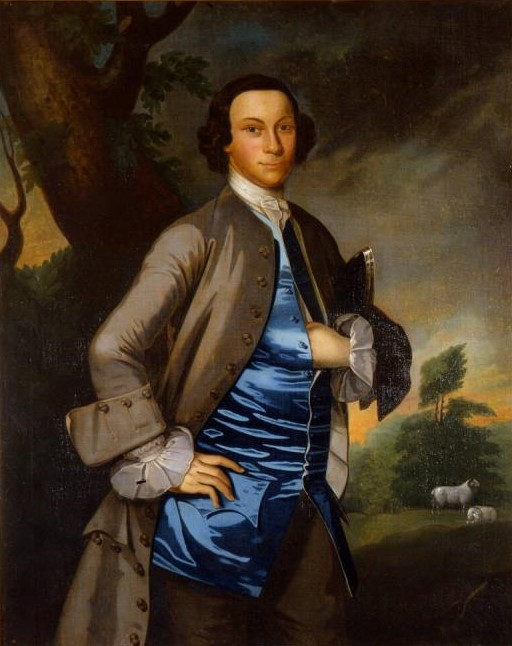
Samuel Washington

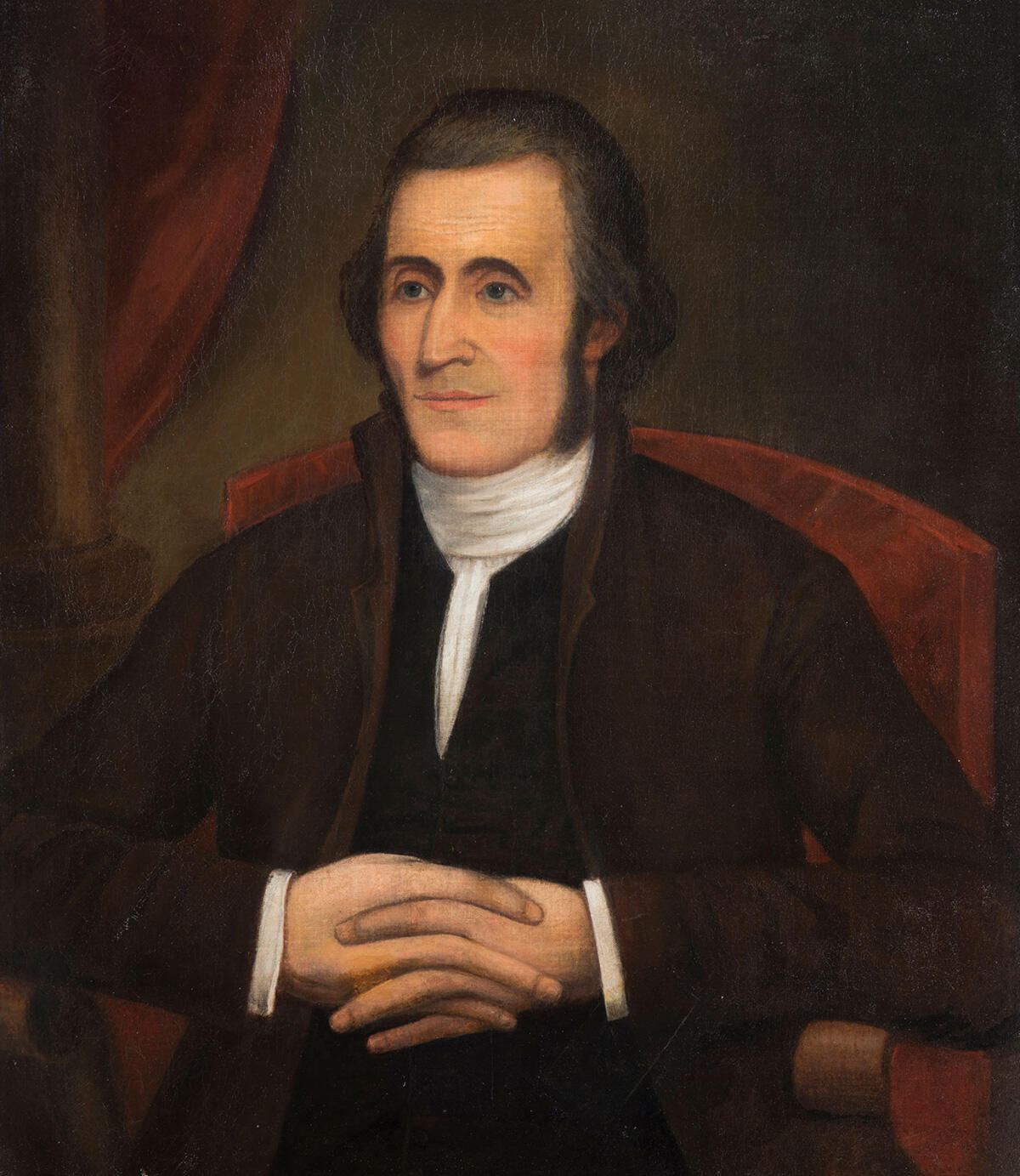
Charles Washington
- Elizabeth "Betty" Washington (1733–1797), younger sister of George Washington, was the only sister to live to adulthood. She was born in Westmoreland County, Colony of Virginia.
- Samuel Washington (1734–1781) was a colonial American officer and politician in Popes Creek (Virginia).
- John Augustine Washington (1736–1787) married Hannah Bushrod (1735–1801) in 1756 and had six children including Bushrod Washington.
- Charles Washington (1738–1799) was the youngest brother.
- Mildred Washington (1739–1740) youngest daughter and child

=== Fifth generation ===
- Bushrod Washington (1762–1829), son of John Augustine Washington and Hannah Bushrod, was a politician and nephew of George Washington.
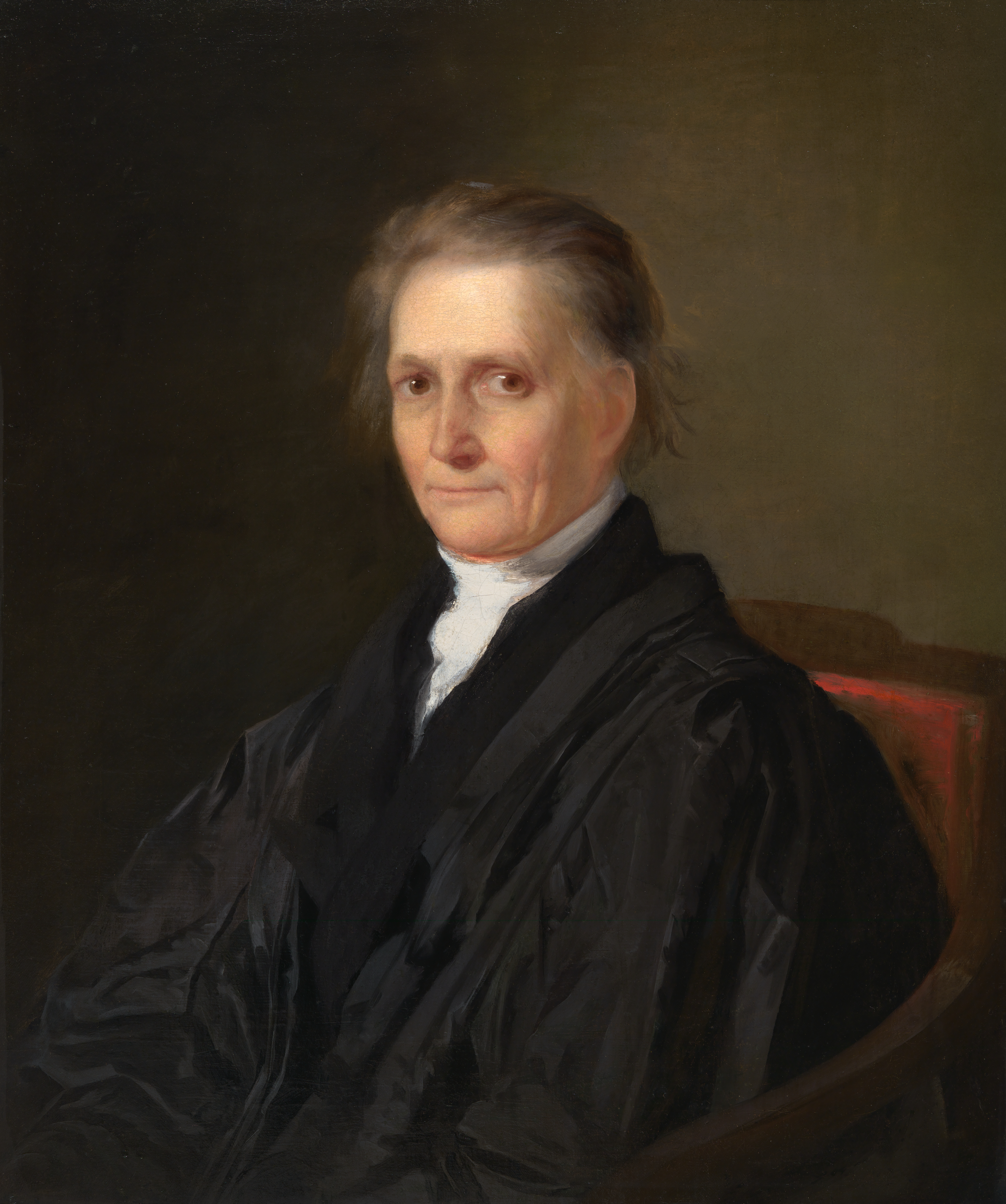
Bushrod Washington

=== Sixth generation ===
- Susannah Sarah Washington (1816–1890), wife of William Alexander Graham, was first lady of North Carolina from 1845 to 1849
- John Augustine Washington III (1821–1861), Confederate lieutenant colonel and the last member of the Washington family to own Mount Vernon.
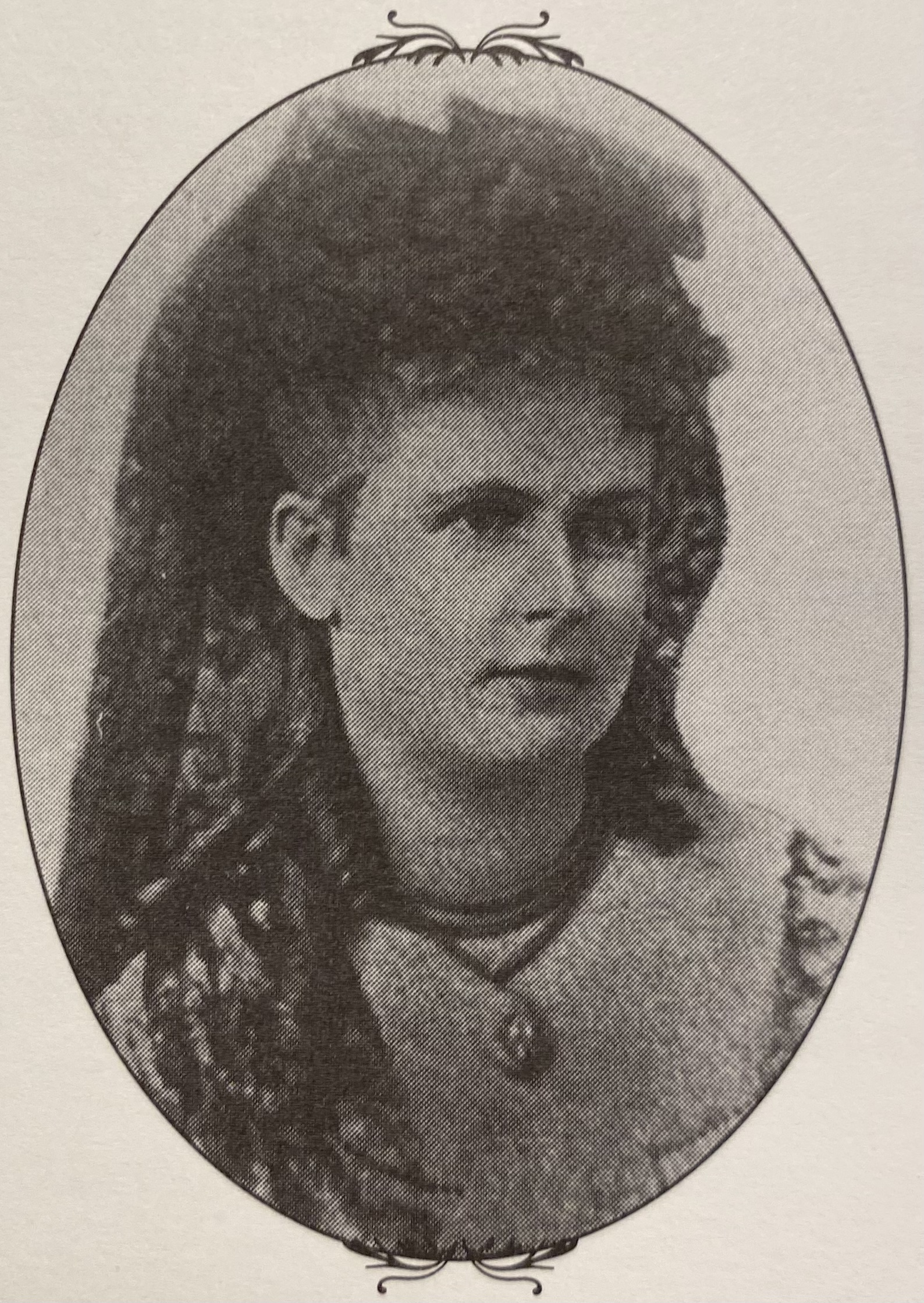
Susannah Sarah Washington

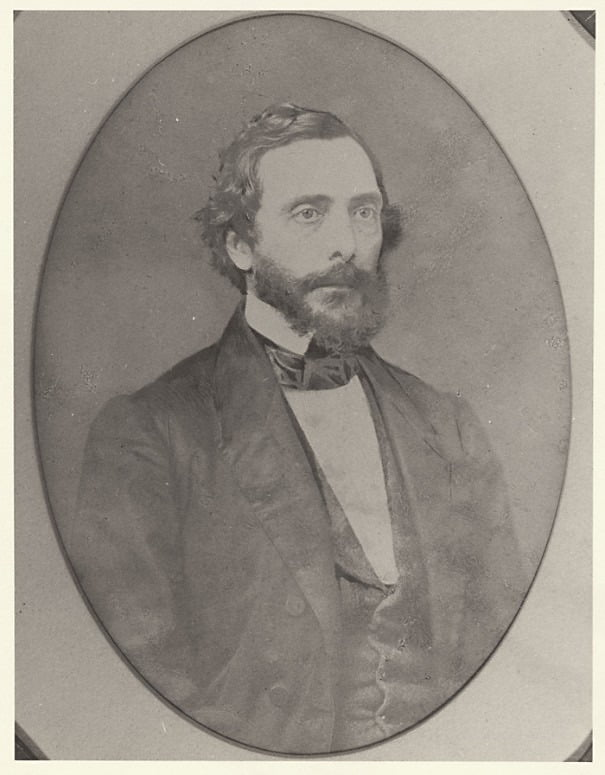
John Augustine Washington III

=== Modern era ===
Some of the closest-living relatives of George Washington are the children of Margret Scott Pratt (Formerly known as Margret Washington): Thomas Lindsey (October 10th, 2003-Present). And the children of Paul Emory Washington (1926–2014): Richard Washington, Bill Washington, Julianne Washington, and Jack Washington who lived in San Antonio, Texas. Julianne Washington had two children, Shelly Coons and Robert Coons. They are among 8,000 other living relatives of George Washington through his younger brothers, Samuel Washington (1734–1781) and John Augustine Washington (1736–1787).

Many descendants of George Washington's immediate family and cousins are members of the National Society of Washington Family Descendants. There are currently over 500 members who have submitted documentation to prove their legal descent.

U.S. Army General George S. Patton was a descendant of George Washington's grandfather Lawrence Washington.

== Heraldry ==
Coat of arms of the Washington family
Notes The design (three red stars over two horizontal red bars on a white field) has been used since 1938 as the basis for the coat of arms and flag of the District of Columbia. It is also found on the Purple Heart. Adopted by 14th century, by the Washington who had possession of Washington Old Hall, County Durham, England. Crest From a crest coronet, a raven rising wings elevated and addorsed proper. Escutcheon Argent two bars Gules, in chief three mullets of the second. Motto Exitus acta probat (The outcome is the test of the act)

== See also ==
- List of United States political families
