= John Mottrom =

John Mottrom (died 1655), or Mottram, was one of the first, if not the first, white settlers in the Northern Neck region of Virginia between 1635 and 1640.

== Political career ==
Mottrom was the first burgess for what would become Northumberland County in 1645 (one of his two times serving as a burgess). He presided over the county court for more than four years until his death in 1655.

== Family ==
He was married to Mary Spencer and had at least three children by her: Ann (1639-1707), John Jr. (1642-?), and Frances (1645–1720). After Mary's death, he married Ursula Bysshe Thompson, the widow of Richard Thompson, who brought three of her own children into the family: Elizabeth, Sarah, and Richard. Their daughter Sarah married Thomas Willoughby, whose sister, Elizabeth Willoughby, married first, Simon Oversee, second, Major George Colclough [third husband of her sister-in-law's mother, Ursula (Bysshe) Thompson Mottrom Colclough]. George Colclough died very soon after their marriage and Elizabeth then married Isaac Allerton, Jr., a trustee of the will of Mottrom's son-in-law Col. Nicholas Spencer.

Daughter Ann Mottrom married Richard Wright (1633-1663) and they had three children: Francis Wright, Ann Wright, and Mottrom Wright. Major Francis Wright married as his first wife, Ann Washington, the daughter of Colonel John Washington and Ann Pope. Francis Wright and Ann Washington had two children, John Wright and Ann Wright.

Daughter Frances Mottrom was married to Col. Nicholas Spencer, Secretary and President of the Council and later acting Governor of the Virginia Colony (1683–1684) and patentee of the land at Mount Vernon with John Washington. The Spencers named one of their children Mottrom Spencer after the child's grandfather John Mottrom. Another son of Frances Mottrom and Nicholas Spencer, William Spencer, returned to the Spencer family parish of Cople, Bedfordshire, where he served as a member of Parliament.

A descendant of John Mottrom's son John Jr. was Spencer Mottrom, whose descendant was the distinguished judge Spencer Roane (1762–1822) of Tappahannock, Virginia, for whom Roane County, West Virginia, is named.

== Land ==
Mottrom owned property along or near the Great Wicomico River and the Chickacoan River. He also owned land on or close to Hull, King's, and Chickacoan creeks. Mottrom was probably the first Englishman to settle on the Virginia side of the Potomac River, and his retreat was a refuge for Protestants fleeing Lord Calvert's Catholic Maryland. His home, Coan Hall, served as the first county seat of Northumberland county. Mottrom was a merchant, owning a shallop with which he traded with Maryland.
