= Nicholas Spencer =

English-born merchant, planter and politician (1633–1689)

- Alleged portrait of Spencer

Member of the Virginia Council of State
- In office 1672–1689 Serving with John Washington

Member of the House of Burgesses for Westmoreland County
- In office 1668–1669 Serving with John Washington
- Preceded by: Isaac Allerton Jr.
- Succeeded by: Richard Lee II
- In office June 1666 – October 1666
- Preceded by: Isaac Allerton Jr
- Succeeded by: Isaac Allerton Jr.

Personal details
- Born: 1633 England
- Died: 23 September 1689 (aged 55–56) Westmoreland County, Virginia
- Occupation: Merchant, planter, politician, militia officer, colonial administrator

Colonel Nicholas Spencer (1633 – 23 September 1689) was an English-born merchant, planter, politician, militia officer and colonial administrator who spent most of his life the in colony of Virginia. Spencer migrated to Westmoreland County, Virginia where he became a planter and briefly represented the county in the Virginia House of Burgesses twice. He later served as the colony's secretary and on the Virginia Governor's Council, rising to become its president. On the departure of his cousin Thomas Colepeper, 2nd Baron Colepeper in 1683, he was appointed as the acting governor of Virginia, serving in the office the arrival of Francis Howard, 5th Baron Howard of Effingham in 1684. Spencer's role as an agent for the Colepepers helped him and John Washington, the ancestor of George Washington, to secure a patent for their joint land grant of the Mount Vernon estate.

== Early and family life ==
Nicholas Spencer was born to an aristocratic English family long seated at Cople, Bedfordshire. The family was related to the Spencer family of Northamptonshire, with whom they shared a coat of arms. In 1531 the Spencers bought the manor of Rowlands at Cople, which they owned for several centuries. Nicholas Spencer, Sr., father of the Virginia emigrant, and his wife, the former Mary Gostwick, second daughter of Sir Edward Gostwick, 2nd Baronet, had several sons, of these William inherited the family estates but died childless after making his heir his nephew, also William, son of his next-brother Nicholas who had moved to Virginia. Another brother, Robert Spencer later removed from Surry County, Virginia, to Talbot County, Maryland, where his descendants long lived at Spencer Hall, the family plantation.

== Virginia career ==
=== Immigration ===
Nicholas Spencer sailed from London to Westmoreland County, Virginia, during the tobacco boom of the 1650s, and became agent for his cousin John Colepeper, 1st Baron Colepeper. Colepeper had inherited his father's share of ownership in the Virginia Company in 1617, and was subsequently knighted and afterwards raised to the peerage. He became the one-seventh proprietor of the Northern Neck of Virginia under the charter of 1649. Colepeper never lived in the colonies, and his son Thomas Culpeper, 2nd Baron Culpeper of Thoresway, who lived at Leeds Castle, did not arrive in Virginia until 1680, twenty years after the tobacco boom ended in a bust prompted by wars with the Dutch and French and the Navigation Act of 1660. Nicholas Spencer had sailed to Virginia to help oversee his cousin John's investment, helping to colonize the frontier during the English Civil War in the mother county, and would survive Bacon's Rebellion.

=== Administrator, planter, legislator and agent ===
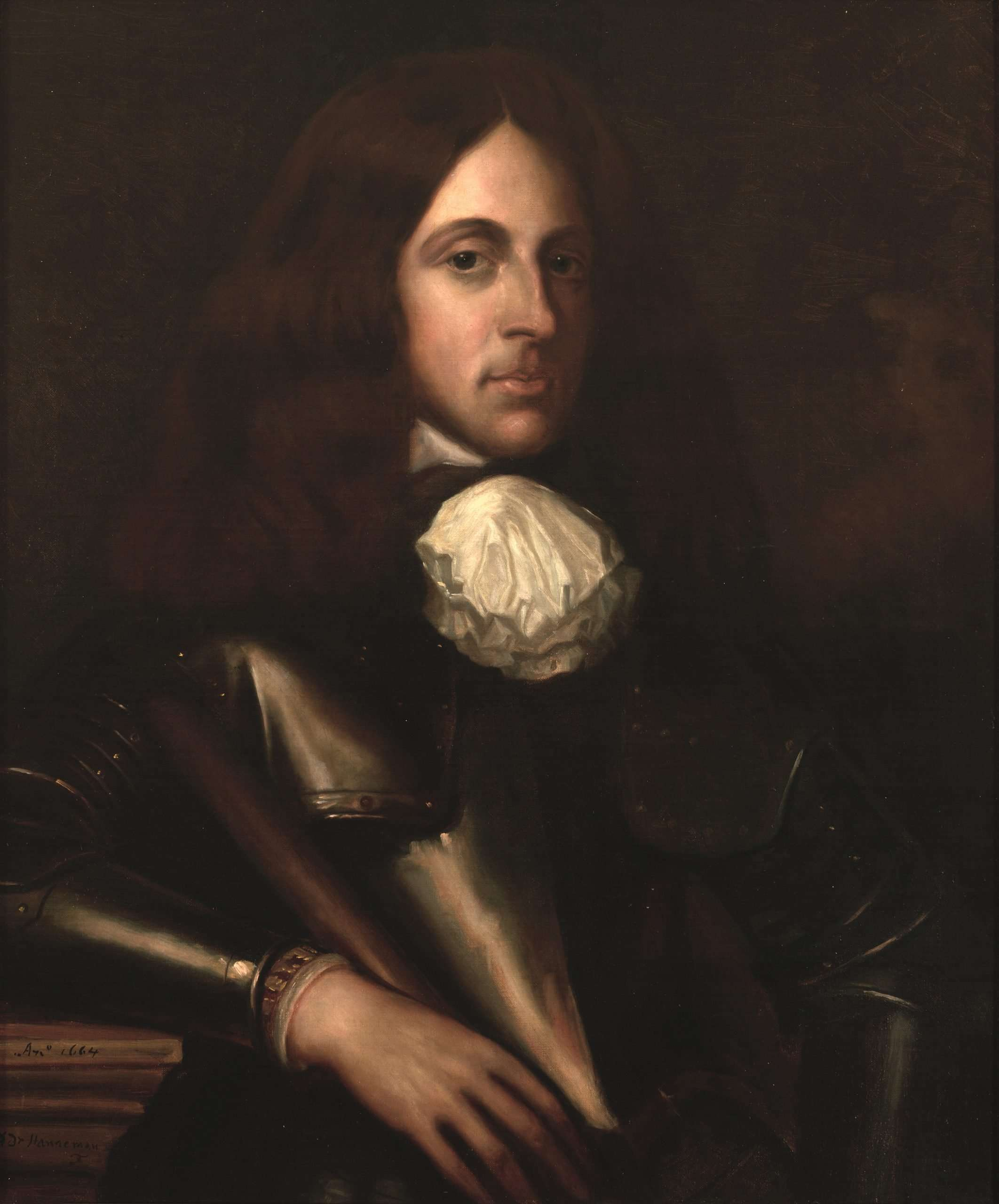
Lord Colepeper, for whom Spencer acted as agent

On arriving in the colony, Spencer secured a lucrative appointment as customs collector, in addition to administrator of his cousin's Virginia estates. (Spencer's job as agent for his Colepeper cousins included such functionary tasks as seizing 'winter beaver skins' or casks of tobacco for debts owed the Colepeper interests). Spencer and his neighbor and longtime burgess John Washington jointly held the post of customs collector on the Potomac. (After Washington died in 1677, Spencer was sole customs collector on the Potomac.) He also won his own land grant. But Spencer was, unlikely as it sounds, apparently an efficient administrator on his own, later being appointed to additional posts in Virginia by virtue of his abilities. Apparently a pragmatic administrator, Spencer was also a hard-nosed capitalist. When it came to slavery, for instance, Spencer weighed the benefits of enslaved labor in a strictly cost-benefit way. "The low price of Tobacco," Spencer wrote, "requires it should bee made as cheap as possible, and that Blacks can make it cheaper than Whites." Spencer's rationale for slavery was probably as succinctly heartless as any committed to paper.

Spencer's role as an aristocratic bureaucrat in the new colony proved tricky. While simultaneously attempting to rationalize slavery, Spencer was also writing to the Privy Council in England about the Virginia Colony's precarious place on the edge of Catholic Maryland. "Unruly and unorderly spirits lay hold of ye motion of affairs," Spencer wrote, "and that under the pretext of Religion, soe as from those false glasses to pretend to betake themselves to Arms... from the groundless Imaginacon [sic] that the few Papists in Maryland and Virginia had conspired to hyre the Seneca Indians, to ye Cutting off, and totall distroying of all ye Protestants."

At the same time, the forces that were propelling the Virginia Colony into the forefront of American economic and social might – primarily the raising of tobacco based on slavery – were simultaneously making Spencer's administrative role tricky. The Virginia colony of the era was, as the eminent colonial historian Edmund S. Morgan wrote, "the volatile society." There were popular uprisings such as Bacon's Rebellion, as well as the tobacco plant-cutting riots. A communication to the Crown in 1674 noted that his opposition to the Bacon Rebellion, for instance, had taken a toll on Spencer's estates. Having done the country "very good service against the Rebells, in that hee affected part of the Country where he resided, and as wee are credibly informed, by his Correspondence here is much Impaired in his Estate by the late Rebells." Westmoreland County voters twice named Spencer as one of their representatives in the House of Burgesses, and each time he served alongside his neighbor John Washington.

In 1682 Spencer wrote to London in the wake of the events roiling Virginia. "Bacon's Rebellion," Spencer told colonial overseers in London, "had left an itching behind it". It was "plaine" that the class tensions stirred by the Rebellion had lingered, with a "mutinous mob" subsequently engaged in "wild and extravagant" rioting, going from farm to farm, tearing tobacco plants out by their roots. The colonial government reacted harshly with patrols by the Virginia militia and the promise of steep fines. The "frenzy," according to Spencer, destroyed crops on over 200 plantations, and was driven by a glutted tobacco market which had depressed prices. Even the wives, Spencer wrote, took up hoes laid down by their husbands and continued to rip out the plants. Such civil disobedience, Nicholas Spencer saw, was the price paid by colonial administrators acting the foil for the empire's merchants back home.

When taken with symptoms of illness, Spencer wrote to his brother in England outlining his pains, and asked him to consult an English doctor and send him the diagnosis as quickly as possible.

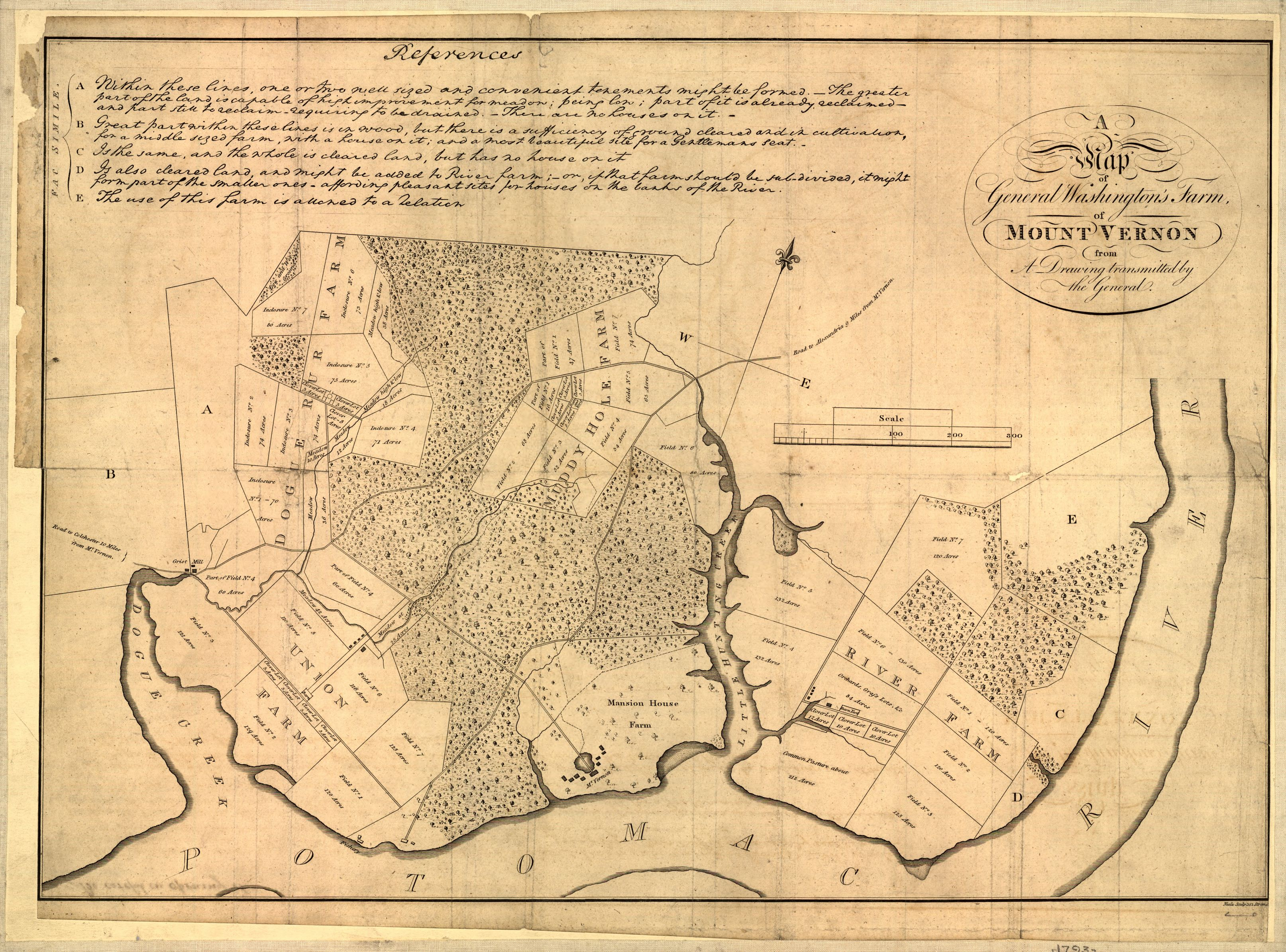
George Washington's map of Mount Vernon, a land grant to John Washington and Nicholas Spencer

Nor was Spencer's role as his Colepeper cousins' agent an easy job. As landlords of an almost-feudal domain eventually encompassing over five million acres (20,000 km²) in the new colony, the Colepeper Northern Neck grant, eventually passed on to their Fairfax heirs, came to be seen by some colonists as an onerous reminder of English aristocratic privilege. In Colepeper's absence, it fell to their relation Spencer to do the heavy-lifting of collecting rents and taxes on the Colepeper barony.

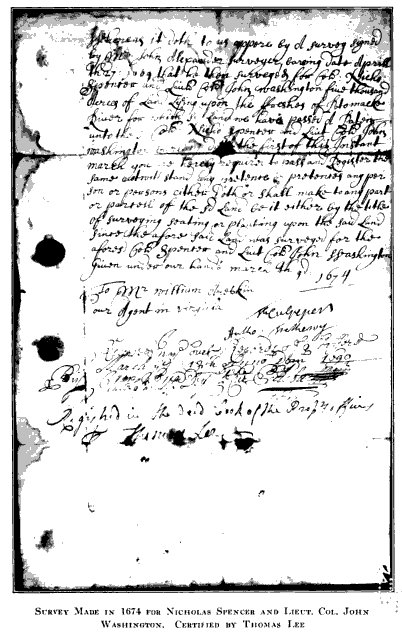
Survey of the land grant at Little Hunting Creek to Col. Nicholas Spencer and Lt. Col. John Washington, site of today's Mount Vernon estate. 1674

Nicholas Spencer was prominent in the affairs of the Virginia colony, residing at his plantation on Nomini Creek. Westmoreland County's Cople Parish, the Anglican parish which embraced half the county, was renamed in 1668 to honor Spencer and his English birthplace at Cople. The Spencer family were related to the Washington family in England, and later in Virginia. Col. Spencer patented the 5,000-acre (20 km^{2}) land grant at Mount Vernon with his cousin Lt. Col. John Washington in 1674, with Spencer acting as the go-between in the sale. The successful patent on the acreage was due largely to Spencer, who acted as agent for his cousin Thomas Colepeper, 2nd Baron Colepeper, who controlled the Northern Neck of Virginia, in which the tract lay.

=== Business interests ===
Coat of Arms of Nicholas Spencer

When John Washington died in 1677, his son Lawrence, George Washington's grandfather, inherited his father's stake in the Mount Vernon property. (Following Col. Nicholas Spencer's death, the Washingtons and the Spencers divided the land grant, with the Spencer heirs taking the larger southern half of the Mount Vernon grant bordering Dogue Creek, and the Washingtons the portion along Little Hunting Creek. The Spencer heirs paid Lawrence Washington 2,500 pounds of tobacco as compensation for their choice.) Later the Washingtons bought out the Spencer interest at Mount Vernon.

Aside from acting as agent for the Colepeper interests, Spencer was frequently involved in Virginia Colony business, and he often corresponded with English administrators in London, as well as family members in Bedfordshire and elsewhere. When his cousin Thomas Colepeper departed Virginia in 1683, Spencer was named Acting Governor, in which capacity he served for nine months until the April 1684 arrival of Francis Howard, 5th Baron Howard of Effingham. Because of the early deaths of his brothers, Spencer was the only surviving son of his father Nicholas, and so inherited extensive family estates in Bedfordshire and Huntingdonshire.

Spencer also was left land by other early prominent settlers in Westmoreland County. In a deposition of 1674 by Lt. Col. John Washington, for instance, who was related to the Pope family of Popes Creek, Washington testified that in his will of 24 June 1674, Washington's kinsman Richard Cole had left all his Virginia lands to Nicholas Spencer. Washington "declareth that hee hath heard Mr. Richard Cole Deceased declare that hee had made a will, and given his whole estate to younge Mr. Nicholas Spencer and further saith not." The controversial Richard Cole had also specified that his body be buried on his plantation in a black walnut coffin with a gravestone of English black marble (to be imported for the purpose) and a tombstone whose epitaph read: "Heere lies Dick Cole a grievous Sinner, That died a Little before Dinner, Yet hopes in Heaven to find a place, To Satiate his Soul with Grace."

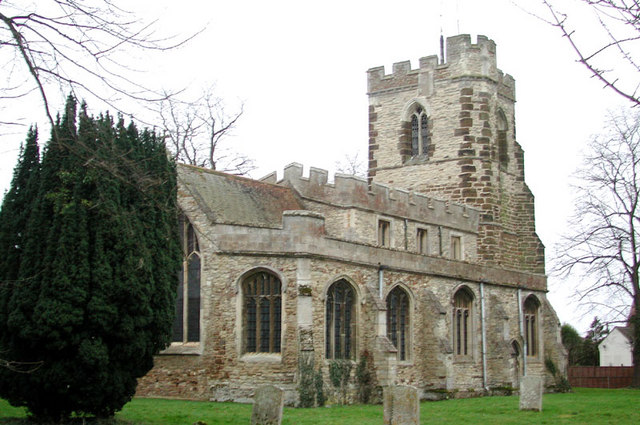
All Saints Church, Cople, Bedfordshire, childhood parish of Nicholas Spencer

== Personal life ==
Spencer married Frances, the daughter of Col. John Mottrom of Coan Hall of Northumberland County, Virginia. Mottrom was likely the first white settler of the Northern Neck in the early seventeenth century. He later served as the first Burgess for Northumberland in 1645, and presided over the county court for four years. Mottrom's daughter and her husband Nicholas Spencer named one of their sons, Mottrom, after John Mottrom. Another Spencer son, William, returned to England for schooling and remained there, serving as a Whig Member of Parliament for Bedfordshire. William Spencer, the son of the Virginia emigrant Nicholas, married Lady Catherine Wentworth, daughter of Thomas Wentworth, 1st Earl of Cleveland. (Following the early death of William, his brother Nicholas Jr. returned to England to succeed to the family estates.)

Nicholas Spencer left five sons: William, Mottrom, Nicholas Jr., John, and Francis (to whom his father left Mount Vernon). Spencer probably had at least two daughters, Elizabeth Spencer and Lettice Barnard to whom Mottrom Spencer referred to in his will as "my sister Mrs. Lettice Barnard"

== Death and legacy ==
Nicholas Spencer died in Virginia in 1688. In his will in April 1688, Spencer styled himself "of Nominy in Westmoreland Co. in Virginia." In his will, filed with the English courts at Canterbury, Col. Spencer named his "singular good friends Coll. Isaac Allerton of Matchotick, Capt. George Brent of Stafford Co. (former Governor of Maryland), and Capt. Lawrence Washington" to serve as trustees of his estates. Capt. Washington, named by Spencer as a trustee, was the younger brother of Lt. Col. John Washington and was born in 1635. He and the other trustees named by Col. Spencer in his will received forty shillings for mourning rings.

Following Nicholas Spencer's death, the family's 6,000-acre (24 km^{2}) plantation at Nomini in Westmoreland was sold. In 1709 Robert Carter purchased the Spencer property from the heirs of Col. Spencer for £800 sterling, marking the end of the Spencer family's residence in Westmoreland, and delineating the future site of Nomini Hall, the Carter family seat in Westmoreland occupying the former Spencer estate.

The English branch of the family continued to live in Bedfordshire, where members of the family served in Parliament and were large landowners. The Spencer family continued to hold its land at Cople, Bedfordshire, until the nineteenth century. "The Spencers' Cople estates," according to the Bedfordshire County Council, "were bought by Francis Brace for the Dowager Duchess of Marlborough, and the manor still was known as Rowlands when part of the Duke of Bedford’s estate at the start of the 19th century."

== Sources ==
- Albion's Seed: Four British Folkways in America (ISBN 0195069056), David Hackett Fischer, Oxford University Press, 1989
- Big Chief Elizabeth: The Adventures and Fate of the First English Colonists in America, Giles Milton, Macmillan, New York, 2001
- American Slavery, American Freedom: The Ordeal of Colonial Virginia, Edmund S. Morgan, W. W. Norton & Co. (reissue), 2003
- Cople, A History of the County of Bedford, Vol. 3, William Page (ed.), Victoria County History, British History Online, british-history.ac.uk
