= John Washington =

English-born Virginia planter and politician (1633–1677)

Member of the House of Burgesses representing Westmoreland County
- In office 1665–1677 Serving with Isaac Allerton Jr., Gerrard Fowke, Nicholas Spencer
- Preceded by: Gerrard Fowke
- Succeeded by: William Pierce

Personal details
- Born: 1633 Tring, Hertfordshire, England
- Died: 1677 (aged 44) Westmoreland County, Virginia, English America
- Spouses: Anne Pope (m. 1658; died 1667) Anne (m. 1670; died 1675) Frances Gerard (m. 1676)
- Children: 3, including Lawrence
- Parents: Lawrence Washington (father); Amphillis Twigden (mother)
- Relatives: Washington family
- Occupation: Merchant; planter; militia officer; politician
- Known for: Paternal great-grandfather of George Washington

John Washington (1633–1677) was an English-born merchant, planter, militia officer, and politician. Born in Tring, Hertfordshire, he subsequently migrated to the English colony of Virginia and became a member of the planter class. In addition to serving in the Virginia militia and owning several slave plantations, Washington also served for many years in the House of Burgesses, representing Westmoreland County. He was the patriarch first member of the Washington family to live in North America and was a paternal great-grandfather of George Washington, the first president of the United States. (Note: This particular John Washington is often called "the immigrant John Washington" by various historians and authors. See Glenn "Introduction" for an example: "This is the vast family originated by the immigrant John Washington ...".)

== Early life and family ==
John Washington was born to rector Lawrence Washington and wife Amphillis Twigden, about 1633 (when his father resigned his fellowship at Oxford that required him to remain unmarried), likely at his maternal grandparents' home in Tring, Hertfordshire. However, as an adult, John Washington gave his age in a Virginia deposition as 45, which would put his birth two years earlier. Before his marriage Lawrence had been a don at the University of Oxford. He had been born at Sulgrave Manor near Banbury in Oxfordshire.

When John was eight, his father enrolled him in Charterhouse School in London to begin preparing for an academic career, but the boy never attended the school. In 1633 the senior Washington had left Oxford to become the rector of All Saints Parish in Purleigh, Essex. During the English Civil War, in 1643 Parliamentary Puritans stripped the royalist Rev. Washington of that clerical position, alleging misconduct that was disputed. Rev. Lawrence Washington then became vicar of an impoverished parish in Little Braxted, Essex, where he died in January 1652. His widow returned to her parents' family home in Tring, Hertfordshire, and in 1655 John became administrator of his widowed mother's estate.

John Washington gained a valuable education in colonial trade, as England had colonies in the Caribbean and North America. He served as Master's Mate on board a tobacco ship when he first came to Virginia.

=== Other Washington Emigrants to North America ===
In 1656 John Washington invested with Edward Prescott in a merchant ship to transport tobacco from North America to Europe. He secured tobacco contracts in Europe, and joined the ship Sea Horse of London in Denmark, to sail as a second mate for the Colony of Virginia. A storm on 28 February 1657 caused the ship (which was fully laden with tobacco for the return journey) to run aground in the Potomac River at a shoal near the confluence with Mattox Creek. Although the vessel was repaired, Washington elected to remain in the colony. However, when he asked for his wages, Prescott said that Washington owed him money instead, so Colonel Nathaniel Pope (who was his future father-in-law) gave Prescott beaver-skins to settle that alleged debt. John's cousin, James Washington, who was the brother-in-law of Henry Moody (fl. 1673), and who had accompanied him on that voyage, did return to Europe on Prescott's ship.

The subject of this article John Washington also had a younger brother, Lawrence Washington, who became a merchant, married Mary Jones of Luton in Bedfordshire in England, then also emigrated from England to the Virginia Colony, where he died. That Lawrence also had a son named John Washington (usually distinguished as "of Chotank", the name of his plantation in King George County, Virginia). That John Washington raised the children of his cousin Lawrence Washington (1659-1698) (first son of the subject of this article): John Washington (1692–1746) and Augustine Washington (1693–1743) when they returned from England.

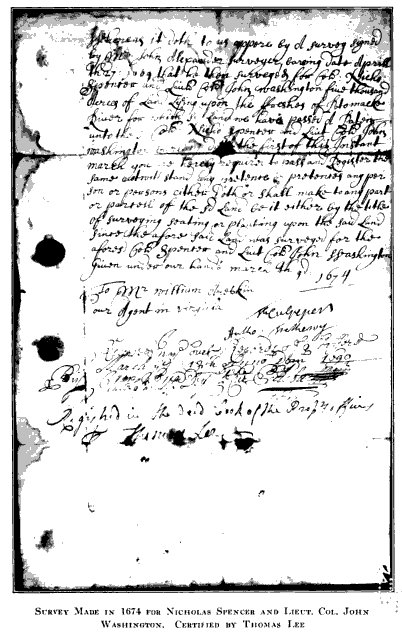
Survey of 1674, certified by Thomas Lee, for 5,000-acre land grant

== Colony of Virginia ==
Washington initially lived at the home of Col. Nathaniel Pope, who had emigrated from England to Maryland about twenty years earlier, then moved across the Potomac River to Virginia where he became a planter on the Northern Neck and a justice of the peace for what was then Northumberland County in 1651 and four years later Lt.Col. of the local militia. During his stay, Washington fell in love with his host's daughter Anne, whom he married late in 1658 or early in 1659. She gave birth to their first son, Laurence in October 1659. Around that time, Washington learned that his nemesis Capt. Prescott had hanged a woman as a witch, and brought murder charges against him in the Maryland General Court; however, the trial conflicted with Laurence's baptism, so Prescott went free for lack of evidence.

Col. Pope gave the couple a wedding gift of 700 acres (2.8 km^{2}) on Mattox Creek, as well as a loan of 80 pounds for startup expenses, which he forgave in his will, which was filed in April 1660. In 1664, Washington bought 100 acres on Bridges Creek near the confluence with the Potomac River, and settled there, in what is now part of George Washington Birthplace National Monument. Washington became a successful planter, depending on the labour of Black slaves and white indentured servants to cultivate tobacco as a commodity crop as well as kitchen crops needed to support his household and workers. By 1668 he was growing tobacco, with holdings of 5,000 acres (20 km^{2}). His will disposed of more than 8,500 acres (34 km^{2}) of land.

Washington's first public office was vestryman of the local Appomattox Parish church in 1661 (although the parish would cease to exist four years later after a reorganization). Washington also served as trustee of Westmoreland County estates and guardian of children. In 1661, Washington also became the county coroner and in 1662 became one of the judges of the county court (with administrative as well as judicial responsibilities) and Major of the militia—both signifying his acceptance into the gentry.

Westmoreland County voters first elected Washington as one of their representatives in the House of Burgesses in 1665, and he continually won re-election until his death more than a decade later. He served alongside planters Isaac Allerton, Gerrard Fowke and his cousin Nicholas Spencer.

In 1672, Washington received promotion to lieutenant colonel in the local militia, as relations with Native Americans again became troubled. (Settlers in the Northern Neck area had been massacred in 1622 and 1644.) In 1675 (by which time Washington's rank had increased to colonel), he and fellow Virginia planter and militia officer Isaac Allerton and Maryland Major Trueman led retaliation against Maryland natives who had killed three Virginia colonists after a trade dispute. During a planned parley with the disgruntled opposition and their allied American Indian leaders, Maryland militia killed at least five surrendered or parleying Doeg and Susquehannock warriors. For his efforts suppressing Native Americans, the Susquehannock gave John the nickname of "Town Destroyer". Some eight decades later, during the French-Indian War, the Seneca would bestow the same title upon Washington's great-grandson, George, for both his own prowess in warfare against the tribes, and in remembrance of the destruction inflicted by his ancestor.

The incident and resultant raids later contributed to Bacon's Rebellion in 1676, during which Col. Washington supported Governor William Berkeley. During the rebellion, Bacon's forces plundered Washington's estate, among others. Following Bacon's death and the suppression of Bacon's Rebellion, an investigating commission criticized Governor William Berkeley, who returned to England, so John's cousin Nicholas Spencer who had traveled with Berkeley to Virginia, became Virginia's acting governor. However, Washington died within months, as discussed below.

== Marriage and family ==
John Washington married three times. He married in late 1658 Anne Pope (St. Mary, Province of Maryland, 1635–1667), daughter of Nathaniel Pope (England, 1603-Cliffs, Westmoreland County, Virginia) and wife Lucy (?-aft. 1660). They had the following children together:

- Lawrence Washington (1659–1698), who would also serve as a Burgess
- John Washington Jr. (1661–23 Feb 1698)
- Anne Washington (c. 1662–1697), who married Francis Wright, who was the county sheriff, vestryman and justice of the county Court
- 2 additional children, names unknown, mentioned as deceased in Washington's will dated 21 September 1675

After Anne Pope's death, Washington married a widow named Anne, who had survived husbands Walter Brodhurst and Henry Brett, but did not have children with Washington. Her maiden name is unknown.

After his second wife's death, John Washington married Frances Gerard (a daughter of Thomas Gerard, and widow of Thomas Speke, Valentine Peyton, and John Appleton). This third marriage occurred about 10 May 1676 when a "joynture" was recorded between Mrs. Frances Appleton and John Washington in Westmoreland County, Virginia.

== Death and legacy ==
Although the exact date of Washington's death has not been recorded, it occurred after he attended a meeting concerning taxes and the suppressed rebellion on August 14, 1677. Washington's will was admitted to probate on September 26, 1677. His estate consisted of more than 8,500 acres. John and his first wife Anne Pope are buried near present-day Colonial Beach, Virginia, at what is now called the George Washington Birthplace National Monument. His vault is the largest in the small family burial plot.

During John’s lifetime, the name of the local parish of the Anglican Church (the established church in colonial Virginia, and thereby also a tax district of the county) was changed to Washington in his honor.

== See also ==
- Washington family

== Bibliography ==
- Randall, Willard Sterne (1997). George Washington: A Life. New York: Holt & Co.
