= Lawrence Washington (1602–1652) =

High Church Rector of the Church of England, great-great-grandfather of George Washington

- Born: c. 1602; Sulgrave, Northamptonshire, England
- Died: c. January 1653 (Note: His exact date of death is unrecorded. Parish registers at All Saints' Church, Maldon, record his burial on 21 January 1652/53. Under the Julian calendar then in use in England, the new year began on 25 March, making the year 1652 in contemporary records, but 1653 in the modern Gregorian calendar. The Sulgrave Manor sources only state the year, not the date of his death.) (aged 50–51); Little Braxted, Essex, England
- Burial place: All Saints' Church with St Peter Churchyard, Maldon, Essex, England
- Occupation: Rector
- Spouse: Amphillis Twigden (m. 1633)
- Children: 6, including John
- Family: Washington family

Lawrence Washington (c. 1602 – c. January 1653) was a High Church rector of the Church of England. He was an ancestor of the Washington family of Virginia, being the paternal great-great-grandfather of George Washington, the first president of the United States.

== Family ==
Lawrence Washington was born in England, circa 1602. He was the fifth son of Lawrence Washington (1565–1616) of Sulgrave Manor, Northamptonshire, who was the son and heir of Robert Washington (1544–1619), of Sulgrave by his first wife, Elizabeth Lyte; she was the daughter and heiress of Walter Lyte of Radway Grange, Warwickshire, and his wife Ursula Woodford. The younger Lawrence's mother was Margaret Butler (1568 – 16 March 1651), the eldest daughter and co-heiress of William Butler of Tyes Hall in Cuckfield, West Sussex, and Margaret Greeke, the daughter of Thomas Greeke, gentleman, of Palsters, Lancashire.

He had seven brothers: Robert, Sir John, Sir William, Richard, Thomas, Gregory and George; and nine sisters: Elizabeth, Joan, Margaret, Alice, Frances, Amy, Lucy, Barbara and Jane. His elder brother, Sir William Washington, married Anne Villiers, half-sister of James I's favourite, George Villiers, 1st Duke of Buckingham.

Washington was a great-grandson of Lawrence Washington (c. 1500 – c. 1583) and his wife Amy Partiger (died 1564), and a great-great-grandson of John Washington (1478–1528) and his wife Margaret Kitson, the sister of Sir Thomas Kitson of Hengrave Hall in Suffolk.

== Career ==
Washington was admitted to Brasenose College, Oxford in 1619. He graduated in 1623 with a Bachelor of Arts, and within a few days was elected a fellow of the college. In 1626 he was awarded a Master of Arts, and in 1627 appointed university lector.

On 26 August 1632 the archbishop of Canterbury, William Laud, made Washington proctor at the University of Oxford. In accordance with the desires of King Charles I, the Supreme Head of the Church of England, Laud sought to enforce the High Church reforms – known as Laudianism – and to rid the university of Puritan clergy. Dr Washington was instrumental in carrying out the archbishop's purges, and his services to Laud earned him an appointment to the well-compensated rectory of All Saints parish at Purleigh in Essex, a position he assumed in 1632. The appointment enabled Washington to marry Amphilis Twigden, a literate, wealthy young widow. Oxford dons were forbidden from marrying, and Washington had risked his post at the university by courting her.

During the English Civil War more than one hundred Church of England clergymen, referred to as "scandalous, malignant priests", were dismissed from their parishes for alleged high treason, Laudianism, or immorality by the Puritan Parliament. In 1643, Washington was censured on trumped-up charges of being "a common frequenter of ale-houses" who "[encouraged] others in that beastly vice" and lost his benefice.

Following his ejection from Purleigh, Washington became rector of the impoverished parish of Little Braxted, also in Essex. His wife and children did not accompany him there, as they were given shelter by the family of Sir Edwin Sandys, sympathetic relations whose patriarch had served as treasurer in the Virginia Company. Through the Sandys, Lawrence's son John secured an apprenticeship with a London merchant where he learned the tobacco trade.

Washington died in poverty, leaving an estate of insufficient value to require the issuance of letters of administration, and was buried in the churchyard of All Saints' Church at Maldon, Essex.

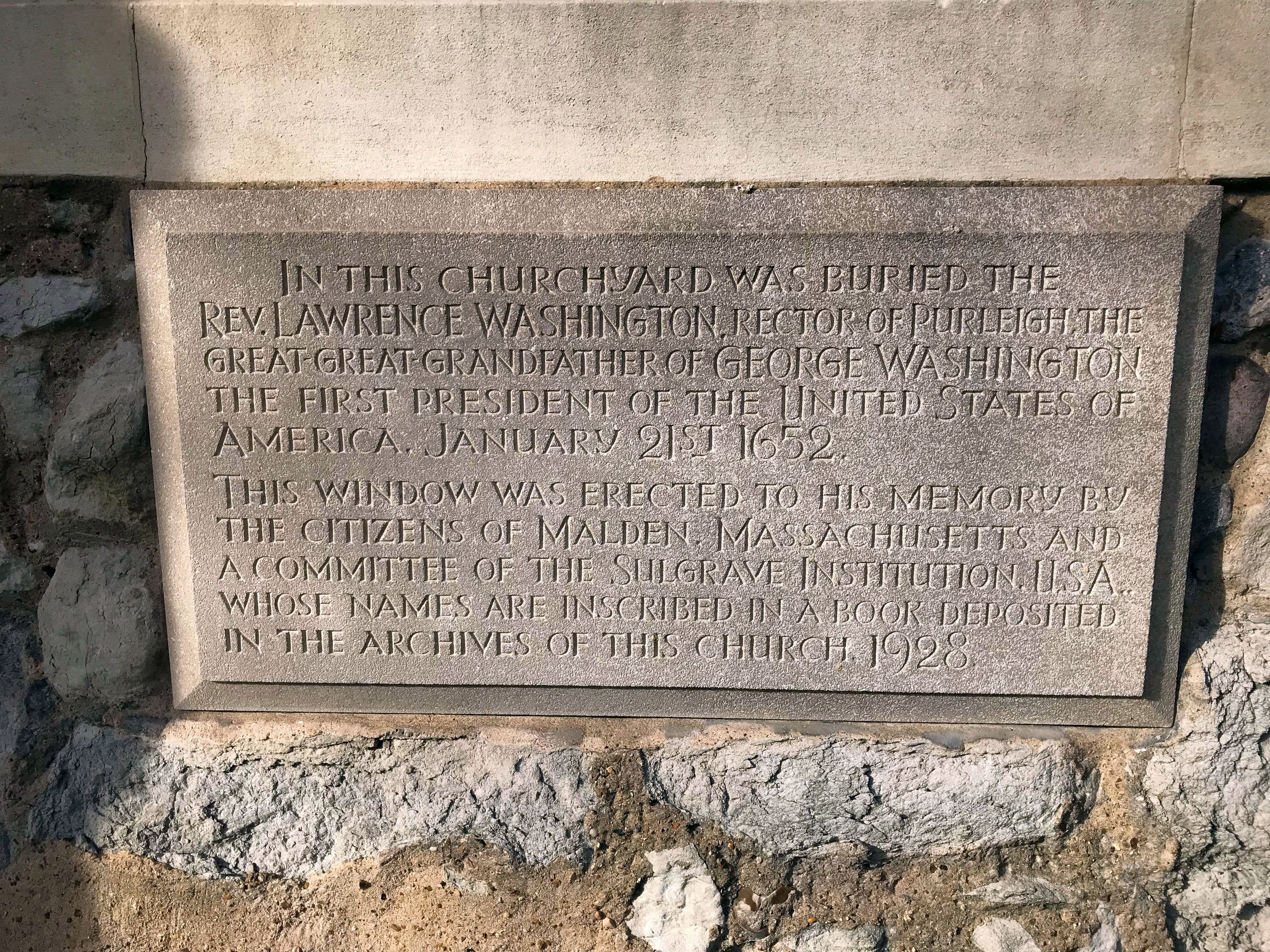
Memorial to Lawrence Washington in the graveyard of All Saints’ Church, Maldon, Essex

Three of Washington's children emigrated to Virginia, as did another family member, Sir Samuel Argall, whose widowed mother, Mary (d. 1598), had married Washington's great-uncle, Lawrence Washington (d. 1619) of Maidstone, Kent; he was Registrar of the Court of Chancery.

== Commemoration ==
In 1928 the Washington window, commemorating the Washington family, was given to All Saints' Church, Maldon, by the citizens of Malden, Massachusetts.

== Marriage and issue ==
In 1630 Washington met Amphilis Twigden on a visit to Pendley Manor in Tring, Hertfordshire. Amphilis, baptised 2 February 1602 and buried on 12 January 1655, was the daughter and co-heiress of John Twigden of Little Creaton, Northamptonshire, and Anne Dicken, daughter of William Dicken and wife Anne Thornton. Lawrence and Amphilis married in Tring in December 1633, and had three sons and three daughters:

- Lt. Col. John Washington was born in 1633/4, shortly after his parents' marriage. He emigrated to Virginia in 1656. He married firstly, in 1658, Anne Pope (d. 1668), the daughter of Nathaniel Pope, gentleman, of Virginia, by whom he had two sons, Lawrence (grandfather of George Washington) and John, and a daughter, Anne. He married secondly Anne (maiden name unknown), widow successively of Walter Broadhurst (d. 1658), and Henry Brett. He married thirdly Frances Gerard, widow successively of Thomas Speak, Valentine Peyton and John Appleton. He left a will dated 21 September 1675, which was proved 10 January 1677:8. After his death, his widow, Frances, married William Hardidge.
- Lawrence Washington, who was baptised at Tring on 18 June 1635. He emigrated to Virginia before May 1659, but returned to England, becoming a merchant in Luton, Bedfordshire. He married firstly Mary Jones, daughter of Edmund Jones, gentleman, of Luton, by whom he had a son, Charles, and a daughter, Mary. He emigrated to Virginia a second time shortly before 27 September 1667. He married secondly, about 1669, Joyce Jones, widow successively of Anthony Hoskins and Alexander Fleming, and daughter of William Jones of Virginia, by whom he had a son, John, and a daughter, Anne. He left a will dated 27 September 1675, which was proved 6 June 1677. After his death his widow, Joyce, married James Yates.
- William Washington (baptised 14 October 1641).
- Elizabeth Washington (baptised 17 August 1636), who married a husband surnamed Rumbold.
- Margaret Washington, who married George Talbot.
- Martha Washington, who emigrated to Virginia in 1678. She married Samuel Hayward of Virginia, son of the London merchant Nicholas Hayward. There were no issue of the marriage. She left a will dated 6 May 1697, which was proved 8 December 1697.

== See also ==
- Washington family

== Sources ==
- Baldwin, R.C.D. (2004). "Argall, Sir Samuel (bap. 1580, d. 1626)". Oxford Dictionary of National Biography (online ed.). Oxford University Press. doi:10.1093/ref:odnb/640. (Subscription, Wikipedia Library access or UK public library membership required.)
- Chernow, Ron (2010). Washington: A Life. New York: Penguin.
- Firth, Charles Harding (1892). "Legge, William (1609?-1672)" . In Lee, Sidney (ed.). Dictionary of National Biography. Vol. 32. London: Smith, Elder & Co. pp. 414–16.
- Metcalfe, Walter C., ed. (1887). The Visitations of Northamptonshire Made in 1564 and 1618–19. London: Mitchell and Hughes. p. 45.
- Randall, Willard Sterne (1997). George Washington: A Life. New York: Holt & Co.
- Richardson, Douglas (2011). Everingham, Kimball G. (ed.). Magna Carta Ancestry: A Study in Colonial and Medieval Families. Vol. IV (2nd ed.). Salt Lake City. p. 417. ISBN 978-1460992708.
- Frank E. Grizzard, Jr. George Washington, A Biographical Compendium Santa Barbara California, ABC-CLIO, 2002, details the portrait of Lawrence Washington with the contemporary phrasing of the charge laid against him and that led to his removal from Purleigh:

common frequenter of ale-houses, not only himself sitting daily tippling there, but also encouraging others in that beastly vice in op. cit. p. 5, s.v. Ancestry.

- C. V. Wedgwood, The King's Peace 1637–1641 London and Glasgow, Collins Fontana, 1973
- C. V. Wedgwood, The King's War 1641–1647 London and Glasgow, Collins Fontana, 1973
- Christopher Hill, The Century of Revolution 1603–1714 London and New York, Routledge Classics, 2006
- A. L. Rowse, The Elizabethan Renaissance: The Life of the Society London, Penguin Classic History, 2000
- A. L. Rowse, Ralegh and the Throckmortons (1962) The Reprint Society, London, 1964 (index s.v. Sulgrave, Washington)
- Wallace Notestein, The English People on the Eve of Colonization 1603–1630 New York, Harper&Brothers, 1954 in: The New American Nation Series (Steele Commager and Morris ed.)
- Blair Worden ed., Stuart England Oxford, Phaedon 1986
- Helen Gardner, (introduction, edition) The Metaphysical Poets Penguin Books, 1972 (biographical notes pp. 306–323)
- Henry Morley, Character Writings of the Seventeenth Century London, George Routledge and Sons, 1891 in: The Carisbrooke Library. XIV
- Hugh Ross Williamson, George Villiers, First Duke of Buckingham: Study for a Biography London, Duckworth 1940
- Glyn Redworth, The Prince and the Infanta: The Cultural Politics of the Spanish Match New Haven and London, Yale University Press, 2003 (index s.v. Washington)
- The Brazen Nose [the college's magazine], volume 41 (2006–7), page 110, for the story of the unpaid debt left by Lawrence.
- The Washingtons of Tring by Murray Neil (Tring, 2013, ISBN 978-0954986025) includes information on the time Ahphyllis and her children lived in this small Hertfordshire Town.
