= John Wessington =

English Benedictine who became prior of Durham Abbey

John Wessington / Washington
- Born: England
- Died: 1451
- Occupations: Benedictine, chancellor of Durham Cathedral

John Wessington (also Washington) (died 1451) was an English Benedictine who became prior of Durham Abbey.

== Life ==
He may have been named for Washington, County Durham. He entered the Benedictine order, and was one of the students regularly sent by the Benedictines of Durham to be educated at their house at Oxford, then known as Durham College and now part of Trinity College, Oxford. In 1398 he became bursar of Durham College, obtaining books for its use from the chapter at Durham, and writing in 1422 a treatise to prove that it should be exempt from the jurisdiction of the general 'prior studentium' at Oxford because the college existed before the appointment of the prior.

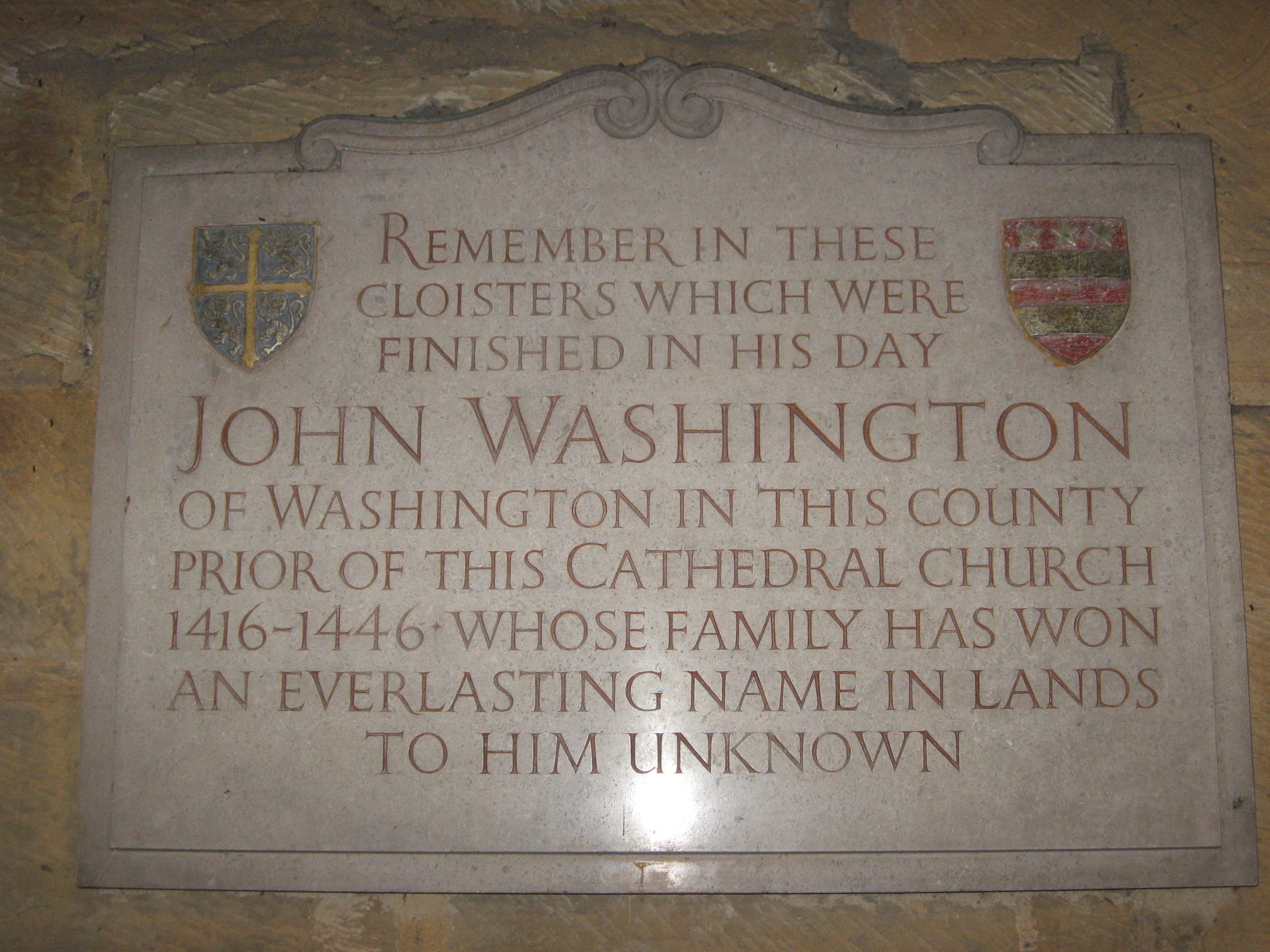
Plaque in Durham Cathedral's cloisters for John Wessington (Washington).

About 1400 Wessington appears as chancellor of Durham Cathedral, and in the autumn of 1416 he was made prior. He retained this office for twenty-nine and a half years, during which he was active in extending and repairing the buildings of the cathedral and its dependent houses. In 1426 he presided over a general chapter of Benedictines in England held at Northampton. He resigned his priory in May 1446, the bishop of Durham Robert Neville, issuing letters for the election of his successor on the 26th. The chapter of Durham made provision for his old age: he was assigned a pension, a private room in the monastery, and five attendants. He died on 9 April 1451.

== Works ==
Edward Bernard gives a list of Wessington's works extant among the manuscripts at Durham Cathedral; they include treatises

- 'De Origine Ordinis monachalis';
- 'De Constitutione Monasteriorum Wermuthensis et Girwicensis [Wearmouth and Jervaulx] et Abbatibus eorum;’
- 'De sanctis Monachis Lindisfarnensibus;’
- 'De Fundatione Athenarum et Universitatum Parisiensis et Oxoniensis,’ and
- 'Vita S. Pauli primi Eremitæ et S. Antonii.'

His 'Defensio Jurium, Libertatum, et Possessionum Ecclesiæ Dunelmensis adversus Malitias et Machinationes ipsa molentium impugnare' extant in Cottonian MS. Vitellius A xix, was damaged by fire, but was partially restored. A volume of his sermons entitled 'Sermones de Festis principalibus tam de Sanctis quam de Tempore,’ is in the Bodleian Library (Laud MSS. Miscellanea 262), and the same manuscript contains 'Materiæ pro Sermonibus eodem forsan Auctore.'

== See also ==
- George Washington
- Coat of arms of the Washington family

== Notes ==
Catholic Church titles
Preceded by John de Hemingbrough	Prior of Durham; 1391–1416	Succeeded by William Ebchester
