= Washington Old Hall =

Manor house associated with the family of George Washington, Tyne & Wear, England

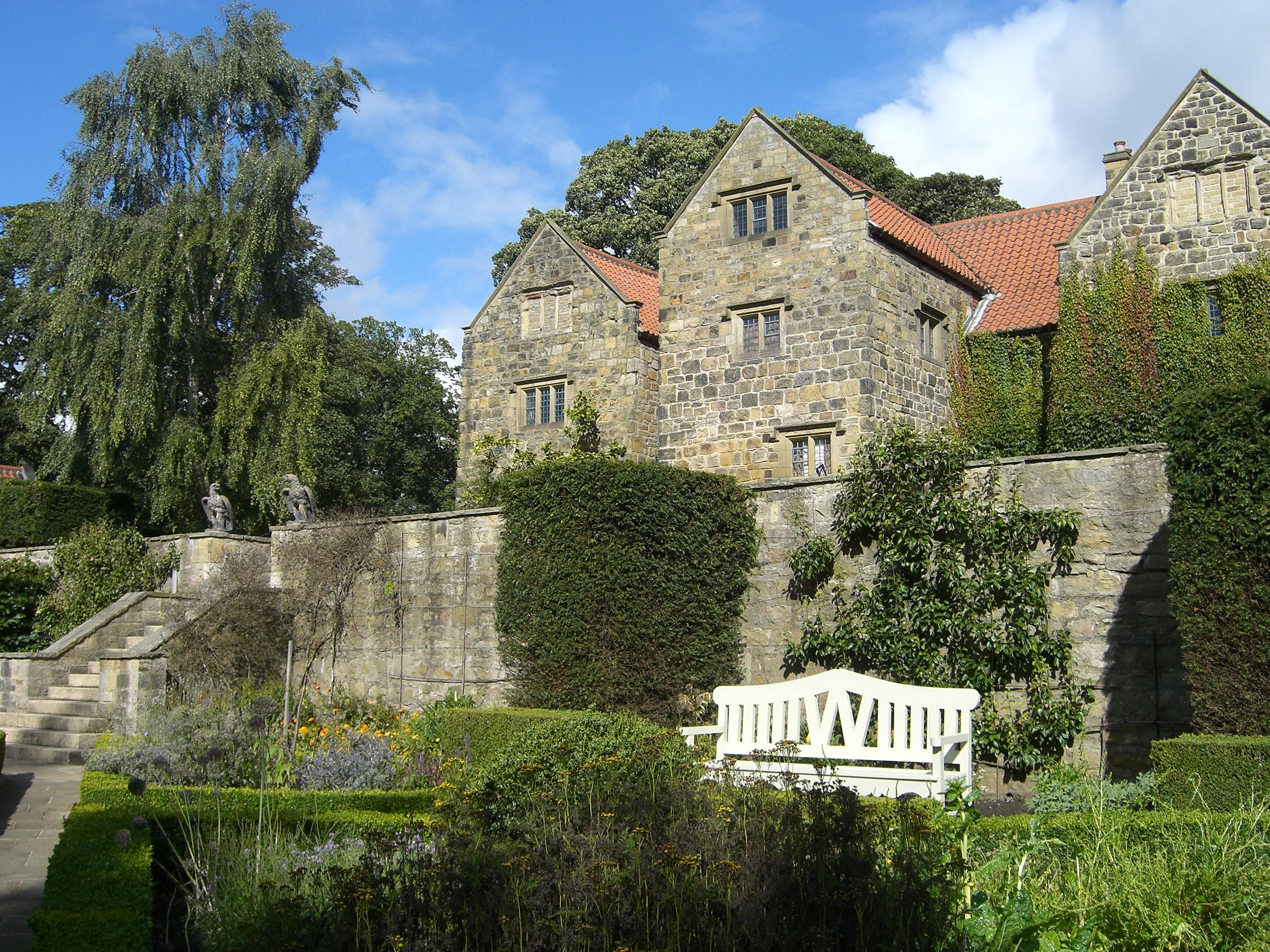

- Location in Tyne and Wear

General information
- Status: Used as a museum
- Location: The Avenue, Washington Village, Washington, Tyne and Wear, England
- Coordinates: 54°54′09.86″N 1°30′59.17″W
- Construction started: c. 1183
- Completed: 17th century
- Client: William de Hertburn
- Owner: National Trust

Technical details
- Material: Stone

Website
- Washington Old Hall

Washington Old Hall is a historic manor house in Washington, Tyne and Wear, England. It lies in the centre of Washington, being surrounded by other villages. The building was the ancestral home of the family of George Washington (1732–1799), the first president of the United States.

== History ==
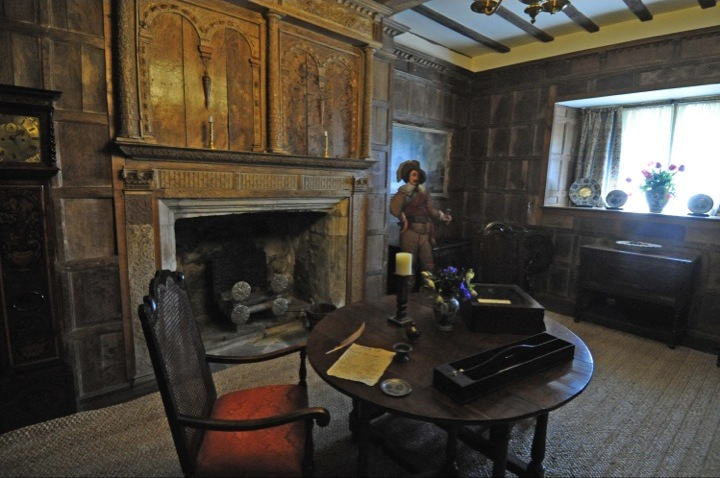
Interior of the Washington Old Hall

William de Hertburne (originally William Bayard), an ancestor of George Washington, assumed tenancy of the Wessyngtonlands from the Bishop of Durham in the late 12th century. Soon after, he changed his name to William de Wessyngton (later Washington). In the early 15th century Sir William Mallory married Dionysia Tempest, the last Wessyngton heir at the Hall. Dionysia was daughter of Sir William Tempest and his cousin, Eleanor Wessyngton. In 1613, Sir John Mallory (a descendant of Sir William Mallory and Dionysia Tempest) and Anna Eure, shareholders in the Virginia Company, moved south to Sulgrave Manor in Northamptonshire, and the manor was sold to the Bishop of Durham.

The Hall continued to be used as a residence until the 19th century, when it became tenement flats and gradually fell into disrepair. In 1936, the building was declared unfit for human habitation, and was rescued from demolition by Fred Hill, a local teacher, who created what is now the "Friends of the Old Hall" to press for restoration of the building. Restoration began in 1937. Preservation work stopped during World War II, but was completed in 1955. The building was opened by the American Ambassador, Winthrop W. Aldrich. In 1957, the National Trust assumed responsibility for the building.

As a result of these historic ties, in 2007, Washington, D.C., and the City of Sunderland announced a "friendship agreement," hoping to create cultural and economic ties with one another.
