= Little Braxted =

Village in Essex, England

Coordinates: 51.801°N 0.661°E

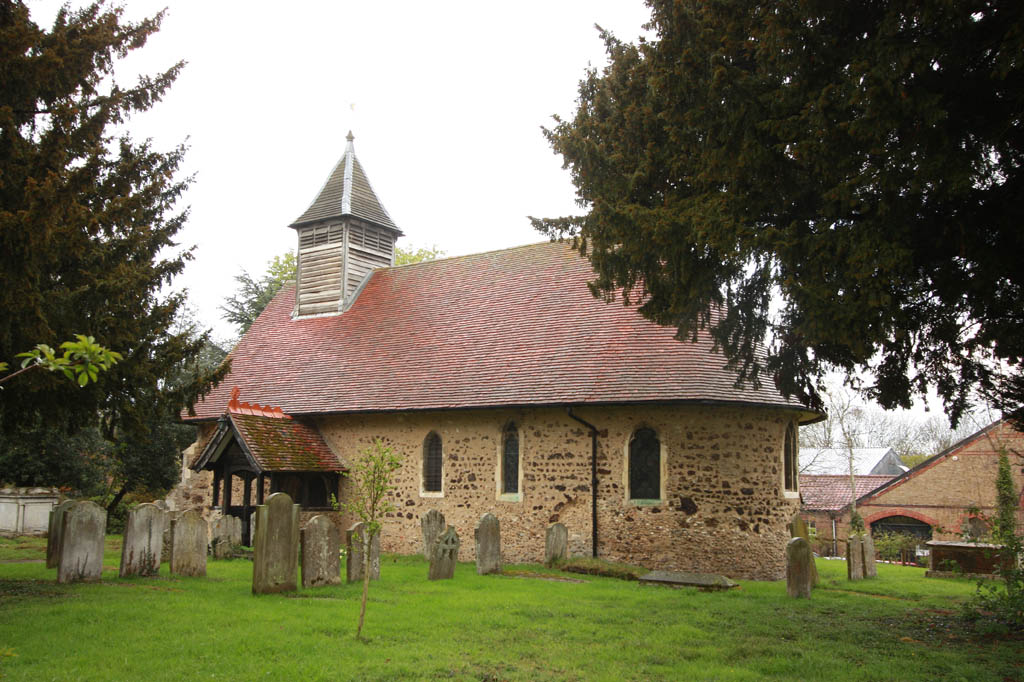
- St Nicholas's Church, Little Braxted

- Location within Essex
- Population: 175 (Parish, 2021)
- OS grid reference: TL 835 147
- Civil parish: Little Braxted
- District: Maldon
- Shire county: Essex
- Region: East
- Country: England
- Sovereign state: United Kingdom
- Post town: Witham
- Postcode district: CM8
- Police: Essex
- Fire: Essex
- Ambulance: East of England
- UK Parliament: Witham

Little Braxted is a village and civil parish located near the town of Witham, in the Maldon district, in the county of Essex, England. At the 2021 census the parish had a population of 175.

Little Braxted has a small medieval church dedicated to St Nicholas, which was extensively decorated in the Victorian era. Little Braxted has one pub, The Green Man.

Lawrence Washington was rector of St Nicholas's Church following his ejection from the somewhat better endowed All Saints Purleigh also in Essex.

In the 1870s Little Braxted was described as having:

Acres, 563. Real property, £1,173. Pop., 111. Houses, 23. The property is divided among a few. The living is a rectory in the diocese of Rochester Value, £118. Patrons, Trustees of Sir W. B. Rush. The church is good.
