= Sulgrave Manor =

Grade I listed house in South Northamptonshire, United Kingdom

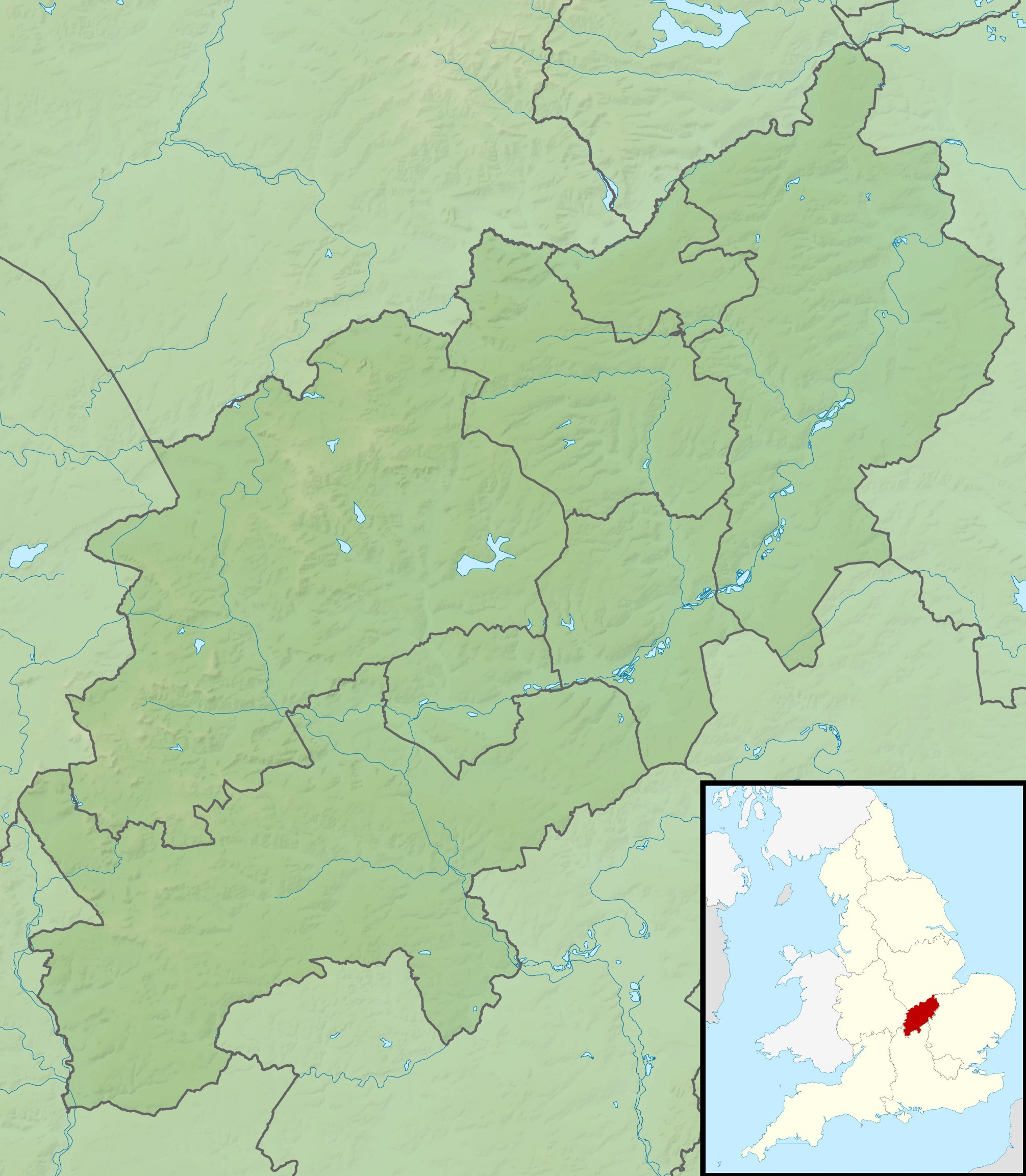
- Location within Northamptonshire
- 52.1058°N 1.1826°W
- Type: House
- Location: Sulgrave, Northamptonshire

History
- Built: 1540–1560; 466 years ago

Site notes
- Architectural style: Tudor hall house
- Owner: Sulgrave Manor Trust

Listed Building – Grade I
- Official name: The Manor House and attached Brewhouse
- Designated: 4 February 1969
- Reference no.: 1371865

Listed Building – Grade II
- Official name: West (Right) Gatepier at entrance to Manor House
- Designated: 4 July 1985
- Reference no.: 1040431

Listed Building – Grade II
- Official name: East (Left) Gatepier at entrance to Manor House
- Designated: 4 July 1985
- Reference no.: 1190936

Listed Building – Grade II
- Official name: Manor Cottage
- Designated: 4 February 1969
- Reference no.: 1190899

National Register of Historic Parks and Gardens
- Official name: Sulgrave Manor Garden
- Designated: 25 June 1984
- Reference no.: 1001040

The house before Reginald Blomfield rebuilt the demolished west wing in the 1920s

Sulgrave Manor is a mid-16th-century Tudor hall house in Sulgrave, Northamptonshire, UK, built by Lawrence Washington, the 3rd great-grandfather of George Washington, first President of the United States.

The manor passed out of the hands of the Washington family in the 17th century and by the 19th had descended to the status of a farmhouse. In 1911, Theodore Roosevelt, a former US president, suggested a memorial to commemorate 100 years of peace between the United Kingdom and the United States, and the manor was bought for this purpose in 1914. Between 1920 and 1930 the manor was restored, and a garden was created by Reginald Blomfield. Sulgrave Manor is now administered by a trust and is a Grade I listed building.

== History ==
The ancestors of George Washington originated in Wessyngton in the north-east of England in the 12th century after assuming tenancy of the area from the Bishop of Durham in exchange for land at Hertburn. In the 14th century they moved south, to Warton in Lancashire, and in the fifteenth, to Sulgrave in Northamptonshire. Northamptonshire had been prominent in the wool trade since the Middle Ages, and Lawrence Washington achieved success as a wool trader and built Sulgrave Manor between 1540 and 1560. His great-grandson, also Lawrence, was born at the manor in 1602. The Washingtons sold the house in the mid-17th century, and a descendant, John Washington (1631–1677), great-grandfather of George, emigrated to Virginia in 1656. In the 18th century Sulgrave was tenanted to a series of farmers. The west wing was demolished circa 1780, and by the early 20th century the manor was derelict.

The Treaty of Ghent, signed on Christmas Eve 1814, had brought an end to the British-American War of 1812. In 1911, Theodore Roosevelt suggested a permanent memorial to commemorate one hundred years of peace between the two nations. Sulgrave Manor was seen as an appropriate monument and, following a fundraising campaign supported by George V, was purchased in 1914 at a cost of $42,500. Additional funding for ongoing maintenance was given by the National Society of the Colonial Dames of America. Work on the project was delayed by the First World War, but in 1920 Sir Reginald Blomfield began a reconstruction of the house, and the creation of a garden as a suitable setting. Blomfield rebuilt the demolished west wing of the hall to regain the lost symmetry of the design.

By the late 20th century, underfunding threatened the continuing existence of the house. An endowment from the estate of the philanthropist Paul Mellon, together with other donations and National Lottery funding, provided the necessary resources to "secure the long term survival of the property". (Note: The redevelopment of the manor was not universally acclaimed; the writer Simon Jenkins decried the "George Washington theme park" approach, while acknowledging the "immaculate" quality of the restoration".) The manor receives circa 20,000 visitors a year, many of them from the United States. Bruce Bailey, Bridget Cherry and Nikolaus Pevsner, in their revised 2013 Northamptonshire volume of the Pevsner Buildings of England series, describe it as a "mecca for American visitors".

== Architecture and description ==
The house consists of three bays and two storeys with attics. The construction material is limestone rubble. The central porch, and the east wing are original 16th century work, while the north wing dates from the 18th century, and the west wing is an early 20th century rebuilding by Blomfield. The house follows the traditional hall house plan, with the fireplace in the Great Chamber being original. The screen is a 20th-century Blomfield replacement.

=== Listing designations ===
Historic England is the statutory body responsible for the listing of buildings in England. It uses a three-tier rating system, classifying listed buildings into three categories; Grade I, the highest grade, for buildings of “exceptional interest”, Grade II*, the next grade, for buildings of “more than special interest”, and Grade II, the lowest grade, for buildings of “special interest”.

Historic England has designated the Manor House, and its attached brewhouse, as Grade I. The gate piers either side of the entrance have Grade II designations, as has Manor Cottage. The Manor House gardens are separately listed as Grade II on the Register of Historic Parks and Gardens of Special Historic Interest in England.

== Sources ==
- Bailey, Bruce; Pevsner, Nikolaus; Cherry, Bridget (2013). Northamptonshire. The Buildings Of England. New Haven, US and London: Yale University Press. ISBN 978-0-300-18507-2. OCLC 964790363.
- Jenkins, Simon (2003). England's Thousand Best Houses. London, UK: Penguin Books. ISBN 978-0-7139-9596-1.
