= Virginia State Route 216 =

State highway in Gloucester County, Virginia, US

State Route 216
- Guinea Road

Route information
- Maintained by VDOT
- Length: 3.61 mi (5.81 km)
- Existed: 1933–present

Major junctions
- West end: US 17 / SR 1219 at Hayes
- East end: SR 649 / SR 653 at Achilles

Location
- Country: United States
- State: Virginia
- Counties: Gloucester

Highway system
- Virginia Routes; Interstate; US; Primary; Secondary; Byways; History; HOT lanes
← SR 215	→ SR 217

State Route 216 (SR 216) is a primary state highway in the U.S. state of Virginia. Known as Guinea Road, the state highway runs 3.61 miles (5.81 km) from U.S. Route 17 (US 17) at Hayes east to SR 649 and SR 653 at Achilles in southeastern Gloucester County.

== Route description ==
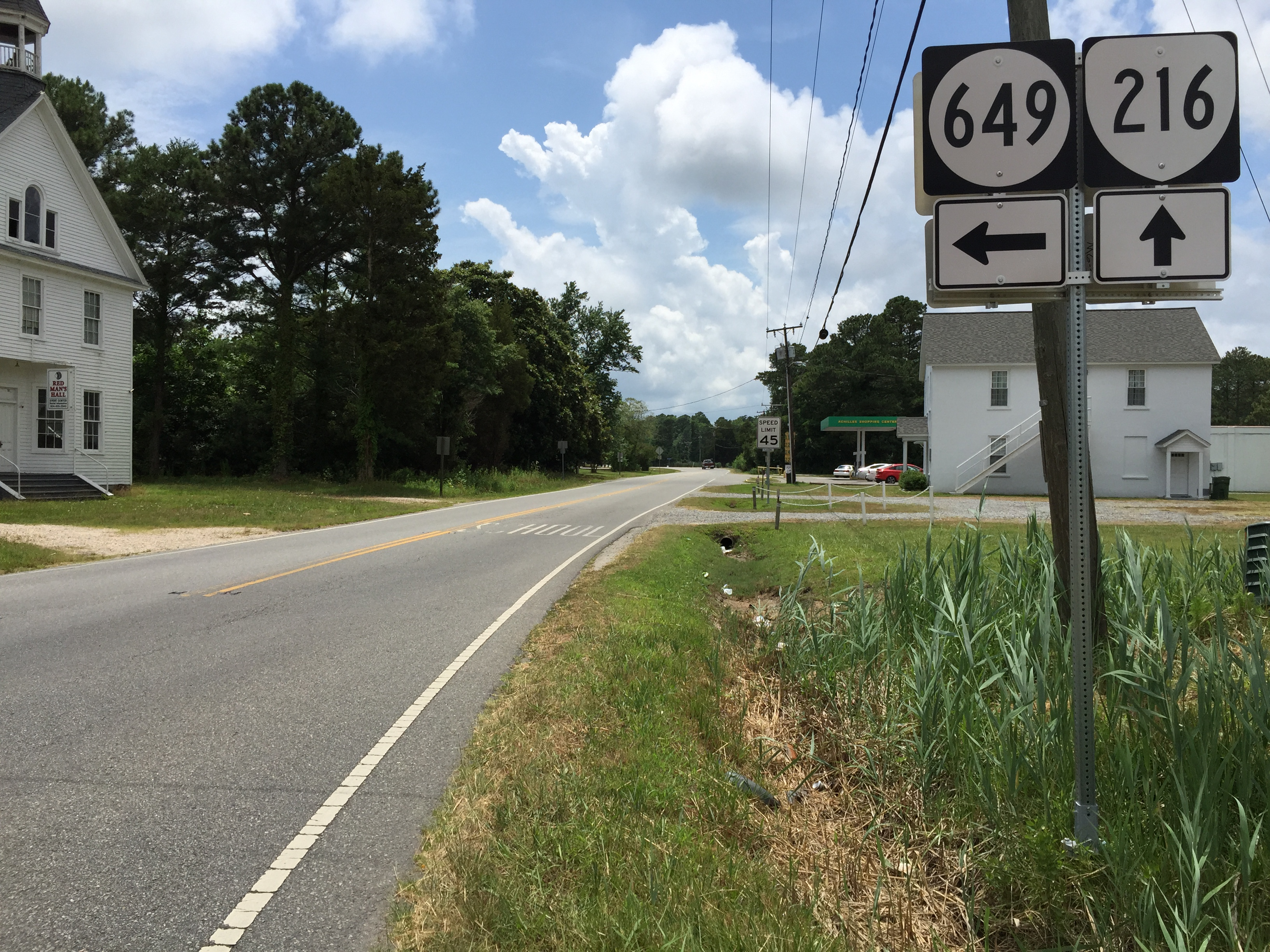
View west at the east end of SR 216 at SR 649 and SR 653 in Achilles

SR 216 begins at an intersection with US 17 (George Washington Memorial Highway) in the hamlet of Hayes just north of Gloucester Point. The state highway heads east as a two-lane undivided road along the height of land between the mouth of the York River to the south and the Severn River to the north. After passing through Bena, SR 216 reaches its eastern terminus at its junction with SR 649 (Maryus Road) and SR 653 (Kings Creek Road) at Achilles. SR 649 and SR 653 head toward Maryus and Severn, respectively, on the Guinea Neck.

== Major intersections ==
The entire route is in Gloucester County.

Location	mi	km	Destinations	Notes
Hayes	0.00	0.00	US 17 (George Washington Memorial Highway) / SR 1219 west (Hook Road)	Western terminus
Achilles	3.61	5.81	SR 649 (Maryus Road) / SR 653 (Kings Creek Road) – Severn	Eastern terminus
1.000 mi = 1.609 km; 1.000 km = 0.621 mi

< SR 621	District 6 State Routes; 1928–1933	SR 623 >
