= List of shipwrecks in March 1864 =

The list of shipwrecks in March 1864 includes ships sunk, foundered, grounded, or otherwise lost during March 1864.

== 1 March ==
List of shipwrecks: 1 March 1864
Ship	State	Description
Archimedes	United Kingdom	The steam schooner was wrecked on a sandbar at the mouth of the Maas in the Netherlands during a storm. Her crew was rescued by local lifesaving personnel.
Princess Louisa	United Kingdom	The ship was lost on the Isla de Lobos, Uruguay. She was on a voyage from London to Buenos Aires, Argentina.
Snow Squall	United States	On 1 March 1864, while carrying gunpowder among other cargo from New York to San Francisco, California, Snow Squall ran aground in the Straits of Le Marie in South America. She was refloated and put to Port Stanley, Falkland Islands, where she was discharged of her cargo and found damaged beyond repair. In July, she was condemned and sold. The largest surviving piece was used as a dock at Port Stanley.
Sir Robert Peel	United Kingdom	The brig was driven ashore at Lowestoft, Suffolk. She was on a voyage from London to Hartlepool, County Durham. She was refloated the next day and taken in to Lowestoft in a severely leaky condition.

== 2 March ==
List of shipwrecks: 2 March 1864
Ship	State	Description
Dalmatian	United Kingdom	The steamship was severely damaged by fire at Alexandria, Egypt and was beached. She was later refloated.
Matchless	United Kingdom	The ship sprang a leak and was abandoned in the North Sea. She was on a voyage from King's Lynn, Norfolk to Fleetwood, Lancashire. She was towed in to Grimsby, Lincolnshire in a derelict condition the next day.
Unidentified schooner	Flag unknown	American Civil War, Union blockade: Carrying ammunition and other assorted cargo, the 80-ton schooner was run aground and burned by her crew in Deadman's Bay on the coast of Florida, Confederate States of America when the schooner USS Annie (United States Navy) approached.

== 3 March ==
List of shipwrecks: 29 February 1864
Ship	State	Description
Gazelle	United Kingdom	The fishing sloop collided with Harte (Hamburg) and sank off Plymouth, Devon. Her crew were rescued.
Hope	United Kingdom	The brig collided with Cumberland (United Kingdom) and sank off the Corsewall Lighthouse, Wigtownshire. Two of her five crew were rescued by Cumberland. Hope was on a voyage from Troon, Ayrshire to Dublin.
Lina	Kingdom of Hanover	The brig was driven ashore at Dungeness, Kent, United Kingdom. She was on a voyage from Rotterdam, South Holland, Netherlands to Buenos Aires, Argentina. She was refloated with the assistance of the Coast Guard and taken in to Dover, Kent.
Sophia	United Kingdom	American Civil War, Union blockade: The schooner was discovered aground in Altamaha Sound, Georgia, Confederate States of America by the schooner USS Dan Smith (United States Navy), which captured her. She eventually was refloated and placed under the control of a U.S. Navy prize crew.
Warner	United Kingdom	The ship was driven ashore at Ness Point, Suffolk. She was on a voyage from Rochester, Kent to Newcastle upon Tyne, Northumberland. She was refloated.

== 4 March ==
List of shipwrecks: 4 March 1864
Ship	State	Description
Arletta	United Kingdom	American Civil War, Union blockade: Carrying a cargo of alcohol, coffee, and whiskey, the 35-to-50-ton schooner was forced aground on the south end of Tybee Island, Georgia, Confederate States of America by the gunboat USS South Carolina (United States Navy), then was captured by a detachment of the 3rd Rhode Island Artillery Regiment.
Desert Flower	United Kingdom	The ship was wrecked on the Long Bank, in the Irish Sea off the coast of County Wexford with the loss of two of her crew. She was on a voyage from Liverpool, Lancashire to Calcutta, India.
Electric	United Kingdom	The barque ran aground on the Cross Sand, in the North Sea off the coast of Norfolk and sank. Her eight crew were rescued by a tug. She was on a voyage from "Aquilas" to Newcastle upon Tyne, Northumberland.
Emily	United Kingdom	The barque sprang a leak and was beached south of Grimsby, Lincolnshire. She was on a voyage from South Shields, County Durham to Genoa, Italy.
Endeavour	United Kingdom	The ship ran aground and was holed by an anchor at Whitby, Yorkshire. She was on a voyage from Middlesbrough to Bridlington, Yorkshire. She was refloated.
Glide	United Kingdom	The brig was lost off Happisburgh, Norfolk. Her six crew were rescued. She was on a voyage from Sunderland, County Durham to Portsmouth, Hampshire.
Telegraph	United Kingdom	The brig was driven ashore at Blakeney, Norfolk. She was on a voyage from South Shields to Plymouth, Devon.

== 5 March ==
List of shipwrecks: 5 March 1864
Ship	State	Description
Ann and Elizabeth	United Kingdom	The smack ran aground on the Whiteness Rock, off the north Kent coast. A lifeboat went to her aid, but her crew refused to abandon ship. She was on a voyage from Shoreham-by-Sea, Sussex to Whitstable, Kent.
Atalanta	United Kingdom	The ship was driven ashore in Gibraltar Bay. She was on a voyage from Cardiff, Glamorgan to Gibraltar.
Audy Letchemy	India	The barque was sunk by a waterspout with the loss of 114 of the 134 people on board. She was on a voyage from "Vengalle" to "Paumben", Ceylon.
Britannia	United Kingdom	The ship was driven ashore at Bawdsey, Suffolk. Her two crew were rescued. She was on a voyage from London to Cley-next-the-Sea, Norfolk. She was refloated and put in to Harwich, Essex.
Chasseur	France	The lugger was driven ashore at Cromer, Norfolk. Her crew were rescued by the Sheringham Lifeboat.
Eyons	United Kingdom	The ship was driven ashore east of Wells-next-the-Sea, Norfolk.
Highlander	United Kingdom	The ship ran aground off Burnham Overy Staithe, Norfolk and was abandoned by her crew. She was on a voyage from Sunderland, County Durham to Southampton, Hampshire.
Jeffrey	United Kingdom	The ship ran aground on the Scratby Sands, Norfolk. She was on a voyage from London to Sunderland, County Durham. She was refloated and taken in to Great Yarmouth.
North Eastern	United Kingdom	The steamship ran aground on the Paternoster Rocks, in the Baltic Sea. She was on a voyage from Cardiff, Glamorgan to Travemünde. She was refloated and put in to Gothenburg, Sweden for repairs.
Richard	United Kingdom	The schooner was driven ashore near Dundalk, County Louth. Her crew were rescued. She was on a voyage from Ardrossan, Ayrshire to Saltney, Cheshire. She was refloated the next day.
Sharp	United Kingdom	The ship ran aground on the Longsand, in the North Sea off the coast of Essex. She was on a voyage from Liverpool, Lancashire to Ipswich, Suffolk. She was refloated.
Verna	United Kingdom	The ship was driven ashore at Sheringham, Norfolk. She was on a voyage from Folkestone, Kent to Blyth, Northumberland. She had become a wreck by 1 April.
Unidentified schooner	United States	American Civil War: The schooner was captured and sunk at Cherrystone, Virginia, Confederate States of America by a mixed force of Confederate States Navy sailors and troopers of the 5th Virginia Cavalry Regiment.

== 6 March ==
List of shipwrecks: 6 March 1864
Ship	State	Description
Adjutor	Denmark	The schooner was driven ashore and wrecked at Cape de Gatt, Spain. She was on a voyage from Hamburg to Naples, Italy.
Edith	United Kingdom	The schooner was driven ashore at Blakeney, Norfolk. She was on a voyage from South Shields, County Durham to Dartmouth, Devon.
Harriet Wade	United Kingdom	The ship ran aground off Sheringham, Norfolk. She was on a voyage from South Shields, County Durham to Alexandria, Egypt. She was refloated and put in to Grimsby, Lincolnshire in a leaky condition.
Jane and Lucy	United Kingdom	The barque collided with the steamship Excelsior (United Kingdom) and sank in the North Sea off the Bull Lightship ( Trinity House). Her crew were rescued by Excelsior. Jane and Lucy was on a voyage from South Shields to Corfu, United States of the Ionian Islands.
John and George	United Kingdom	The sloop ran aground on the Turner Shoal. She was on a voyage from London to Guernsey, Channel Islands. She was refloated and taken in to Lowestoft, Suffolk.
Mary and Louisa	United Kingdom	The barque was run into by the steamship Excelsior (United Kingdom) and sank in the Humber. Her crew were rescued by Excelsior. Mary and Louisa was on a voyage from Sunderland, County Durham to Genoa, Italy.
Onyx	United Kingdom	The paddle tug sank at North Shields, Northumberland.
USS Peterhoff	United States Navy	American Civil War, Union blockade: The former yacht, operating as a patrol vessel, was rammed and sunk off New Inlet, North Carolina, Confederate States of America by the screw steamer USS Monticello (United States Navy), which had mistaken her for a blockade runner. Men from the screw steamers USS Mount Vernon and USS Niphon (both United States Navy) boarded her on 7 March and completed her destruction to prevent her salvage by Confederate forces.
Rose	United Kingdom	The schooner was driven ashore at the Spurn Lighthouse, Yorkshire. Her crew were rescued by the steamship Superb (United Kingdom) She was refloated on 27 March and taken in to Grimsby, Lincolnshire.

== 7 March ==
List of shipwrecks: 7 March 1864
Ship	State	Description
Ann	United Kingdom	The ship was driven ashore in Gibraltar Bay. She was on a voyage from Liverpool, Lancashire to Gibraltar. She was refloated on 27 March.
Asia	United Kingdom	The barque was driven ashore in Gibraltar Bay. She was on a voyage from Newcastle upon Tyne, Northumberland to Cuba. She was refloated on 9 March but was consequently condemned.
Challenger	United Kingdom	The brig collided with the brig Ariel (United Kingdom) off the Maplin Sand, in the North Sea off the coast of Essex. Her crew were rescued by Ariel. Challenger was located with the assistance of a steamship but had to be beached on the Gunfleet Sand. She was on a voyage from Guernsey, Channel Islands to London.
Lass of Dereham	United Kingdom	The barque was driven ashore in Gibraltar Bay. She was on a voyage from Cardiff, Glamorgan to Gibraltar. She was refloated on 9 March.
Louisa Ann	United Kingdom	The ship was driven ashore in Gibraltar Bay. She was on a voyage from Liverpool to Gibraltar. She was refloated on 10 March.
Marys	United Kingdom	The brig was driven ashore at West Hartlepool, County Durham. She was on a voyage from Whitby, Yorkshire to West Hartlepool.
Preusse	Flag unknown	The ship was driven ashore in Gibraltar Bay. She was on a voyage from Liverpool to Gibraltar. She was refloated on 10 March.
Titan	United States Army	American Civil War: After being captured on 5 March by a Confederate States Navy raiding force, the tug was pursued by the gunboat USS Tulip (United States Navy) up the Piankatank River to its head at Freeport, Virginia, Confederate States of America, where the Confederates burned her to the waterline when the armed steamer USS Commodore Read, armed sidewheel paddle steamer USS Jacob Bell, armed tugs USS Fuchsia and USS Thomas Freeborn, and the armed screw steamer USS Currituck (all United States Navy) arrived on the scene.
Undaunted	United Kingdom	The brig was wrecked on the Cross Sand, in the North Sea off the coast of Norfolk. Her seven crew were rescued. She was on a voyage from London to Newcastle upon Tyne, Northumberland.

== 8 March ==
List of shipwrecks: 8 March 1864
Ship	State	Description
USS Conestoga	United States Navy	American Civil War: The 672-ton timberclad sidewheel paddle steamer sank with the loss of two lives less than four minutes after colliding with the sidewheel paddle steamer USS General Price (United States Navy) in the Mississippi River about ten miles (16 km) downstream of Grand Gulf, Mississippi, Confederate States of America. She was refloated on 27 September 1865.
Jane	United Kingdom	The ship struck the Bremer Rock, in the Firth of Forth and was damaged. She was on a voyage from Bo'ness, Lothian to Ipswich, Suffolk. She put back to Bo'ness in a leaky condition.
Janes	United Kingdom	The brig departed from Hartlepool, County Durham for Hamburg. No further trace, presumed foundered with the loss of all hands.
Lord Burleigh	United Kingdom	The ship was wrecked at the mouth of the Benito River.
Sunrise	United Kingdom	The schooner was driven ashore in the Larne Lough. She was on a voyage from Boston, Lincolnshire to Belfast, County Antrim. She was refloated.

== 9 March ==
List of shipwrecks: 9 March 1864
Ship	State	Description
A. J. Sweeney	United States	Loaded with a cargo of corn and twenty-eight horses, the 244-ton sternwheel paddle steamer struck a bridge abutment, burned, and sank without loss of life in the Cumberland River near Clarksville, Tennessee. She later was refloated and dismantled.
James Lantest	United Kingdom	The ship departed from Hartlepool, County Durham for Glückstadt, Duchy of Schleswig. No further trace, presumed foundered in the North Sea with the loss of all hands.
Mary Ann	United Kingdom	The schooner ran aground on the Herd Sand, in the North Sea off the coast of County Durham. She was refloated with the assistance of two lifeboats and towed in to North Shields, Northumberland.
Olive Branch	United Kingdom	The brigantine struck a rock off the Isle of Skye, Outer Hebrides and sank. Her six crew were rescued by the steamship Clydesdale (United Kingdom). Oliver Branch was on a voyage from Liverpool, Lancashire to the River Tyne.
Otter, and United States	United Kingdom	The steamship Otter collided with the paddle tug United States, which was being launched at South Shields, County Durham. She was consequently beached on the Dortwick Sands. She was on a voyage from Newcastle upon Tyne to Hamburg. Otter was refloated the next day. United States was also damaged. In July 1864, the Admiralty Court found Otter to be to blame for the collision. This decision was successfully appealed in February 1865.

== 10 March ==
List of shipwrecks: 10 March 1864
Ship	State	Description
Alice Drouchet	France	The ship was wrecked in the Old Bahama Channel. She was on a voyage from Havre de Grâce, Seine-Inférieure to Havana, Cuba.
Coral	United Kingdom	The schooner ran aground on the Shipwash Sand, in the North Sea off the coast of Suffolk. She floated off and sank with the loss of all hands. She was on a voyage from Cardiff, Glamorgan to Ipswich, Suffolk.
Helen	Confederate States of America	Departing Charleston, South Carolina, during a gale to run the Union blockade and carry a cargo of cotton to Nassau, Bahamas, the 185-register ton steamer was wrecked on Bowman's Jetty at the entrance to Charleston Harbor. Only one person on board survived.
Mary Clark	United Kingdom	The brig departed from South Shields, County Durham for Hamburg. No further trace, presumed foundered with the loss of all hands.

== 11 March ==
List of shipwrecks: 11 March 1864
Ship	State	Description
Barbara	United Kingdom	The sloop was wrecked at Lossiemouth, Moray. Her crew were rescued by the Lossiemouth Lifeboat.
Countess of Cassillis	United Kingdom	The ship was driven ashore at Carlingford, County Louth. She was on a voyage from Dublin to Moville Bay.
Hearts of Oak	United Kingdom	The barque was wrecked on the Corton Sand, in the North Sea off the coast of Suffolk.
Julia Baker	United States	American Civil War: The schooner was boarded and burned by Confederate guerrillas near Newport News, Virginia, Confederate States of America.
Seagull	United States	Carrying a cargo of oysters, the full-rigged ship came ashore on Brigantine Beach near Atlantic City, New Jersey, full of water and with her crew missing.
Unnamed	United Kingdom	The ship collided with Empire (United Kingdom) and sank off Red Wharf Bay, Anglesey.

== 12 March ==
List of shipwrecks: 12 March 1864
Ship	State	Description
Waterloo	United Kingdom	The ship was wrecked in the Hooghly River. She was on a voyage from Calcutta to Bombay, India.

== 13 March ==
List of shipwrecks: 13 March 1864
Ship	State	Description
George	United Kingdom	The brig ran aground on Scroby Sands, Norfolk. She was on a voyage from Middlesbrough, Yorkshire to London. She was refloated and resumed her voyage in a leaky condition, having taken on four extra hands.
Queen Bee	United Kingdom	The ship ran aground in the Hay River. She was on a voyage from Calcutta, India to London. She was refloated on 27 March and subsequently resumed her voyage.
Susan Douglas	United Kingdom	The ship was wrecked on "Samma Sanna Island" with the loss of a crew member. She was on a voyage from Hong Kong to Ningpo, China.

== 14 March ==
List of shipwrecks: 14 March 1864
Ship	State	Description
Generous	United Kingdom	The brig was damaged by fire at Liverpool, Lancashire.
Marion	Confederate States of America	American Civil War, Union blockade: The badly leaking 12-to-18-ton schooner was sunk by the gunboat USS Aroostook (United States Navy) in the Gulf of Mexico off Galveston, Texas, after Aroostook removed her sails, rigging, and cargo of iron and salt. Aroostook had captured her off Velasco, Texas, on 12 March.

== 15 March ==
List of shipwrecks: 15 March 1864
Ship	State	Description
British Queen	United Kingdom	The ship was driven ashore on Bute. She was on a voyage from Glasgow, Renfrewshire to Batavia, Netherlands East Indies and Singapore, Straits Settlements. She was refloated with assistance from the tug Sir Isaac Newton (United Kingdom) and towed in to Gourock, Renfrewshire.
CSS Countess	Confederate States Navy	American Civil War, Red River Campaign: The 198-ton sidewheel paddle steamer ran aground in the Alexandria Falls on the Red River of the South near Alexandria, Louisiana, and was burned by her crew to prevent her capture by advancing Union forces.
Falcon	United Kingdom	The brig ran aground on the Middelplaat, in the North Sea off the mouth of the Elbe and was abandoned by her crew. She was on a voyage from Sunderland, County Durham to Hamburg.
Fanny Bullitt	United States	The 438-ton sidewheel paddle steamer struck a snag and sank in the Mississippi River at Napoleon, Arkansas.
Garland	United Kingdom	The brig ran aground on the Middelplaat and was abandoned by her crew. She was on a voyage from Northumberland, Northumberland to Hamburg.
Klevsdampt	Netherlands	The schooner was run down and sunk off Cape Spartel, Morocco by Alabama (United Kingdom). All seven people on board were rescued by Alabama. Klevsdampt was on a voyage from Amsterdam, North Holland to Naples, Italy.
Sappho	United Kingdom	The barque was wrecked in Table Bay. Her crew were rescued by the Cape Town Lifeboat. She was on a voyage from Shanghai, China to London.
Sinbad	United Kingdom	The schooner was driven ashore near the Point of Ayr Lighthouse, Flintshire. She was on a voyage from Par, Cornwall to Runcorn, Cheshire.

== 16 March ==
List of shipwrecks: 16 March 1864
Ship	State	Description
Algorto	Spain	The brig caught fire and sank at sea. Her crew took to a boat; they were rescued the next day by the full-rigged ship Childe Harold (United Kingdom).
Christiana	United Kingdom	The ship ran aground on the Kish Bank, in the Irish Sea. She was on a voyage from Liverpool, Lancashire to Galați, Ottoman Empire. She was refloated and put in to Kingstown, County Dublin.
Ellora	United Kingdom	The ship was set on fire off Newport, Monmouthshire and was severely damaged. She was on a voyage from Newport to New York, United States. Her crew were arrested.
Jardine	France	The schooner collided with the steamship Prompt (United Kingdom) and sank off Calais. She was on a voyage from Caen, Calvados to Dunkirk, Nord.
Moss Rose	United Kingdom	The ship was damaged by fire at Liverpool, Lancashire.

== 17 March ==
List of shipwrecks: 17 March 1864
Ship	State	Description
Aris	United Kingdom	The schooner collided with the schooner Susan (United Kingdom) and was run ashore at São Rocque, São Miguel Island, Azores. She was on a voyage from London to "Martel". Although condemned, she was refloated and temporary repairs were made with the intention of taking her to Faial Island or Lisbon, Portugal for permanent repairs.
Cicero	United Kingdom	The ship was damaged by fire at Bombay, India.
Highland Mary	United Kingdom	The schooner was in collision with the steamship Oscar (United Kingdom) and was beached on the Thompson Bank, in the Belfast Lough. She was on a voyage from Fleetwood, Lancashire to Belfast, County Antrim. She was refloated the next day.
Magdalina	(Denmark) Duchy of Schleswig	The schooner was abandoned in the North Sea. Her crew were rescued by a Swedish vessel. She was on a voyage from Heiligenhafen to Leith, Lothian, United Kingdom.
SMS Nymphe	Prussian Navy	Second Schleswig War, Battle of Jasmund: The Nymphe-class corvette was damaged in battle off Rügen.
Triumph	United States	The schooner was sunk in a collision with Western Metropolis near the Cross Rip Lightship. 2 crew died, survivors rescued by "Western Metropolis".

== 18 March ==
List of shipwrecks: 18 March 1864
Ship	State	Description
Algorta, and Hiawatha	Spain; United Kingdom	The barque Hiawatha was abandoned in the Atlantic Ocean in a sinking condition. Her crew got aboard the derelict brig Algorta, which was on fire and had been abandoned. Algorta drove ashore on São Jorge Island, Azores on 22 March with some loss of life. Algorta was on a voyage from Matamoros, Mexico to Liverpool, Lancashire, United Kingdom. Hiawatha was on a voyage from Cardiff, Glamorgan to New York, United States.
Frederick	United Kingdom	The smack ran aground on the Sunk Sand, in the North Sea off the coast of Essex and sank. Her crew were rescued.

== 19 March ==
List of shipwrecks: 19 March 1864
Ship	State	Description
Bernard	United Kingdom	The ship foundered in the North Sea. Her crew were rescued. She was on a voyage from London to Dordrecht, South Holland, Netherlands.
Gleemaiden	United Kingdom	The brigantine was wrecked on a reef (14°50′N 77°32′W). She was on a voyage from Savanilla, United States of Colombia to Bremen.
Grace	(United Kingdom of Great Britain and Ireland) Jersey	The sloop struck the Great Russell Rock and was damaged. She was on a voyage from Havre de Grâce, Seine-Inférieure, France to Guernsey, Channel Islands. She arrived at Guernsey in a sinking condition.
Grotete	United Kingdom	The ship was driven ashore at Breaksea Point, Glamorgan. She was on a voyage from Liverpool, Lancashire to Jamaica. She was refloated and taken in to Penarth, Glamorgan in a leaky condition.
William S. Hansell	United Kingdom	The barque was driven ashore and wrecked at Cape Hatteras, North Carolina, Confederate States of America. She was on a voyage from Guantánamo, Cuba to Philadelphia, Pennsylvania, United States.

== 20 March ==
List of shipwrecks: 20 March 1864
Ship	State	Description
Apollo	United Kingdom	The schooner ran aground on the Newcombe Sand, in the North Sea off the coast of Suffolk. She was on a voyage from South Shields, County Durham to Maldon, Essex. She was refloated and completed her voyage in a severely leaky condition.
Avon	United Kingdom	The ship ran aground off Sanlúcar de Barrameda, Spain. She was on a voyage from Sunderland, County Durham to Cádiz, Spain. She was refloated and resumed her voyage.
Betsy	United Kingdom	The brig sprang a leak and foundered off Huntcliffe Foot, County Durham. Her crew were rescued by the tug Renown (United Kingdom). Betsy was on a voyage from Hartlepool, County Durham to London.
Rose	United Kingdom	The schooner was driven against the pier and wrecked at Macduff, Aberdeenshire. Her crew were rescued. She was on a voyage from Sunderland to Aberdeen.
Spread Eagle	United States	The 389-ton sidewheel paddle steamer struck a snag and sank in the Missouri River at either Pickney Bend or Washington, Missouri.
Volunteer	United Kingdom	The schooner was wrecked at Macduff. Her crew were rescued.
Zone	(United Kingdom of Great Britain and Ireland) Victoria	The schooner was wrecked at Newcastle, New South Wales with the loss of three lives.

== 21 March ==
List of shipwrecks: 21 March 1864
Ship	State	Description
Clifton	Confederate States of America	American Civil War, Union blockade: The 892-bulk-ton sidewheel paddle steamer ran aground on the coast of Texas at Sabine Bar on the west side of Sabine Pass while trying to run the Union blockade. Unable to refloat her, her crew threw her cargo overboard and burned her to prevent her capture by Union forces.
Elizabeth	United Kingdom	The brig sprang a leak and was beached at Spurn Point, Yorkshire. She was on a voyage from Hartlepool, County Durham to Bordeaux, Gironde, France.
Phœbe Dunbar	(United Kingdom of Great Britain and Ireland) New South Wales	The ship was destroyed by fire at Sydney.
Wild Pigeon	Flag unknown	American Civil War, Union blockade: During a blockade-running voyage from Havana, Cuba, to Florida, the 37-ton schooner sank immediately with the loss of one crewman after being rammed amidships by the screw steamer USS Hendrick Hudson (United States Navy).

== 22 March ==
List of shipwrecks: 22 March 1864
Ship	State	Description
Acorn	United Kingdom	The brig ran aground on the Lappin Sand, off the coast of Denmark. She was refloated and resumed her voyage.
Agamemnon	United Kingdom	The ship was abandoned in the Atlantic Ocean She was on a voyage from Saint John, New Brunswick to Liverpool, Lancashire. She was discovered on 29 March by Beeston Castle (United Kingdom) and taken in to Crookhaven, County Cork.
Buffalo	United States	American Civil War, Union blockade: Taken as a prize by the barque USS Braziliera (United States Navy) on 1 February, the sloop was driven high onto a beach on Ossabaw Island on the coast of Georgia, Confederate States of America by a storm.
Emily	Flag unknown	The schooner ran aground on a beach south of Velasco, Texas, Confederate States of America and quickly filled with sand and water.
Nathaniel	United Kingdom	The brig sprang a leak and was beached north of Grimsby, Lincolnshire. She was on a voyage from Newcastle upon Tyne, Northumberland to London.
Tomas Joaquin	Spain	The ship was wrecked on Bulabadlangen Island, north east of Panay, Spanish East Indies. She was reported to be on a voyage from Glasgow, Renfrewshire, United Kingdom to Cienfuegos, Cuba, or "Zelin".

== 23 March ==
List of shipwrecks: 23 March 1864
Ship	State	Description
Bezer	United Kingdom	The schooner was abandoned off the Outer Hebrides. Her crew were rescued by Philosopher (United Kingdom). Bezer was set afire as she was a danger to shipping. She was on a voyage from Hull, Yorkshire.
Henrica	United States	The ship was driven ashore at New York. She was on a voyage from Buenos Aires, Argentina to New York.
Panama	United States	The Barque was lost off Rooney Point, Sandy Cape, Fraser Island, off the coast of Queensland, Australia.

== 24 March ==
List of shipwrecks: 24 March 1864
Ship	State	Description
Julia Baker	United States	American Civil War: The schooner was burned by Confederate guerrillas near Chuckatuck Creek, Virginia.
Maid of the Mist	United Kingdom	The ship struck the Runnel Stone and sank. She was on a voyage from London to Cardiff, Glamorgan.

== 25 March ==
List of shipwrecks: 25 March 1864
Ship	State	Description
Agenoria	United Kingdom	The smack collided with the steamship Norfolk (United Kingdom) and ran aground at the Landguard Fort, Felixtowe, Suffolk. She was refloated.
Alice Dean	United States	The 394-ton sidewheel paddle steamer struck a bank on the Ohio River 10 miles (16 km) below Cincinnati, Ohio, and sank. Jennie Hubbs and Lady Pike (Flags unknown) took off her passengers and cargo. She was later refloated.
Decotah	United States	American Civil War: Confederate troops under the command of General Nathan Bedford Forrest burned the 230-ton sternwheel paddle steamer while she was under repair on the Marine Ways at Paducah, Kentucky.
Glenny	United Kingdom	The ship departed from Sunderland, County Durham for Calcutta, India. No further trace, presumed foundered with the loss of all hands.
John Land	United States	The clipper was abandoned in the Atlantic Ocean. Her crew were rescued by the barque T. R. Patello (United Kingdom). John Land was on a voyage from Newport, Monmouthshire, United Kingdom to New York.
Unidentified schooner	Flag unknown	American Civil War, Union blockade: Carrying a cargo of salt and leather, the schooner was burned at Swansboro or Morehead City, North Carolina (sources disagree), by a joint Union Army-United States Navy landing party consisting of personnel from the 158th New York Infantry Regiment and the sidewheel paddle steamer USS Britannia (United States Navy).

== 26 March ==
List of shipwrecks: 26 March 1864
Ship	State	Description
Howard	United Kingdom	The fishing smack was driven ashore and wrecked at Scarborough, Yorkshire. The sole crew member on board was rescued by the Scarborough Lifeboat.
Victoire	France	The schooner was wrecked on the Libenton Rocks, off "Aberach". She was on a voyage from Marans, Charente-Inférieure to Campbeltown, Argyllshire, United Kingdom.
Vixen	(United Kingdom of Great Britain and Ireland) Isle of Man	The schooner foundered off Port Erin with the loss of all on board. She was on a voyage from Bordeaux, Gironde, France to Belfast, County Antrim.
Volunteer	United Kingdom	The ship was driven ashore and wrecked at Banff, Aberdeenshire. She was on a voyage from Newcastle upon Tyne, Northumberland to Macduff, Aberdeenshire.

== 27 March ==
List of shipwrecks: 27 March 1864
Ship	State	Description
San Sebastián y Habanera	Spain	The ship was wrecked at San Sebastián.

== 28 March ==
List of shipwrecks: 28 March 1864
Ship	State	Description
Amity	United Kingdom	The ship ran aground in the Rangoon River. She was on a voyage from Rangoon, Burma to Cork or Falmouth, Cornwall. She was refloated and resumed her voyage.
Diana	United Kingdom	The schooner collided with the brig Rover, the tugs Fury, United States and Universe (all United Kingdom) and two schooners then ran aground in the River Mersey. She was on a voyage from Glasgow, Renfrewshire to Liverpool, Lancashire. She was refloated and taken in to Liverpool.
Euroclydon	United Kingdom	The ship ran aground on the Bembridge Ledge, off the Isle of Wight. She was on a voyage from Sunderland, County Durham to Southampton, Hampshire. She was refloated and resumed her voyage.
J. H. Russell	United States	American Civil War: On a voyage to New Orleans, Louisiana, with a cargo of cattle, cotton, hogs, mules, and seed, the 416-ton sidewheel paddle steamer was destroyed at Plaquemine, Louisiana, Confederate States of America, by a fire set by a Confederate agent.
USS Kingfisher	United States Navy	American Civil War, Union blockade: The 451-ton barque was wrecked off the coast of South Carolina, California States of America on a shoal on the Combahee Bank in Saint Helena Sound near the south end of Otter Island. She was abandoned on 5 April.
Tempest	United States	The 63-ton sternwheel paddle steamer was sunk by ice on the Ohio River at Cincinnati, Ohio.
W. Libbey	United Kingdom	The ship ran aground in the Rangoon River. She was on a voyage from Rangoon to Cork or Falmouth. She was refloated and resumed her voyage.
Woodford	United States	American Civil War, Red River Campaign: The 487-ton sidewheel Hospital ship was wrecked and sank on the Red River of the South while going over the Alexandria Falls near Alexandria, Louisiana, Confederate States of America.
Unidentified schooner	Confederate States of America	American Civil War, Union blockade: Loaded with a cargo of cotton, the schooner was destroyed in Matagorda Bay off the coast of Texas by the armed sidewheel paddle steamer USS Estrella (United States Navy).

== 29 March ==
List of shipwrecks: 29 March 1864
Ship	State	Description
Alert	United Kingdom	The brigantine was driven ashore and sank north of Cambois, Northumberland. She was on a voyage from the River Tyne to Dundee, Forfarshire.
Avon	United States	American Civil War: The full-rigged ship, carrying a cargo of 1,600 tons of guano from Howland Island to Cork, United Kingdom, was captured, used as a gunnery target, and burned in the North Atlantic Ocean (15°11′N 34°25′W) by the screw sloop-of-war CSS Florida (Confederate States Navy).
Catharine	Hamburg	The schooner was wrecked on the Tille, in the North Sea. Her crew were rescued. She was on a voyage from Middlesbrough, Yorkshire to Harburg.
City of New York	United Kingdom	The steamship was wrecked on the Daunt Rock, off the coast of County Cork. All 270 people on board were rescued. She was on a voyage from New York, United States to Liverpool, Lancashire. City of New York broke in two on 19 April during an attempt to refloat her and was a total loss.
Florence	United States	The 399-ton steamer struck a snag and sank in the Missouri River near Atchison, Kansas.
Pacific	United Kingdom	The steamship collided with a schooner in the Kattegat and was beached at Copenhagen, Denmark. She was on a voyage from Danzig to Sunderland, County Durham. She was taken in to Copenhagen for repairs.

== 30 March ==
List of shipwrecks: 30 March 1864
Ship	State	Description
Columbia	United States	The 44-ton screw tug burned on the Mississippi River at Memphis, Tennessee.
Ellida	Sweden	The ship was driven ashore and wrecked at Pillau, Prussia. Her crew were rescued. She was on a voyage from Kalmar to Pillau.
Etta	Confederate States of America	American Civil War, Union blockade: The schooner, a blockade runner, was destroyed near Cedar Key, Florida, by a boat expedition from the gunboat USS Sagamore (United States Navy).
Gazelle	United Kingdom	The ship caught fire at Londonderry and was scuttled.
Unidentified schooner	Confederate States of America	American Civil War, Union blockade: The schooner, a blockade runner, was destroyed near Cedar Key, Florida, by a boat expedition from the gunboat USS Sagamore (United States Navy).

== 31 March ==
List of shipwrecks: 31 March 1864
Ship	State	Description
Camillus	United Kingdom	The schooner collided with the barque Henriette (Netherlands) and sank in the Atlantic Ocean. Her crew were rescued. She was on a voyage from Rio de Janeiro, Brazil to Queenstown, County Cork.
Childe Harold	United Kingdom	The full-rigged ship was abandoned in the Atlantic Ocean (35°09′N 22°15′W). All on board were rescued by the brigantine Fredericke( Grand Duchy of Oldenburg). Childe Harold was on a voyage from Glasgow, Renfrewshire to Saint Thomas, Virgin Islands.
Osprey	United Kingdom	The barque ran aground on the Longsand, in the North Sea off the coast of Essex, and sank. She was on a voyage from Hull, Yorkshire to Quebec City, Province of Canada, British North America. She was refloated with the assistance of the smack Increase (United Kingdom) and put in to Harwich, Essex.
Weaver	United Kingdom	The ship was driven ashore near Pwllheli, Caernarfonshire. She was on a voyage from "Crunetti" to Porthdinllaen, Caernarfonshire. She was refloated on 2 April and subsequently resumed her voyage.

== Unknown date ==
List of shipwrecks: Unknown date in March 1864
Ship	State	Description
Agricola	United Kingdom	The ship foundered off the Outer Hebrides. She was on a voyage from Manila, Spanish East Indies to Liverpool, Lancashire.
Alexandria	United States	The full-rigged ship was wrecked in the Rhio Straits.
Archimedes	United Kingdom	The steamship was driven ashore and wrecked at Brielle, South Holland, Netherlands.
Banyard	United States	The fishing schooner sailed from Gloucester, Massachusetts and vanished, probably sank in a gale on the Georges Bank on the 22-23.
Charles Carrol	United States	The fishing schooner sailed from Gloucester, Massachusetts and vanished, probably sank in a gale on the Georges Bank on the 22-23.
Christian	United Kingdom	The ship ran aground and was damaged. She was on a voyage from Cardiff, Glamorgan to a port in the Great Belt. She was refloated and put in to Helsingør, Denmark in a leaky condition.
Dennis Hill	United Kingdom	The ship was driven ashore at Odesa. She was refloated.
Ella Brache	United Kingdom	The ship was wrecked on the Mateloto Reef. Her crew were rescued by the brig Liberia (France.
Elvina	United Kingdom	The ship was wrecked in the Hooghly River.
Emily	United Kingdom	The smack was driven ashore and wrecked on Burr Island. She was on a voyage from Troon, Ayrshire to Llanelly, Glamorgan.
Emma Frances	United States	The fishing schooner sailed from Gloucester, Massachusetts on the 22nd and vanished, probably sank in a gale on the 22-23. Lost with all 9 crew.
Exile	United Kingdom	The ship was driven ashore at Runton, Norfolk. She was on a voyage from Newcastle upon Tyne, Northumberland to Marseille, Bouches-du-Rhône, France. She was refloated on 6 March.
Fairy	United Kingdom	The ship was wrecked on the coast of the Cape Colony. She was on a voyage from Hondeklip Bay to Table Bay.
Fleur de Para	France	The ship was wrecked at the mouth of the Pará River. She was on a voyage from Havre de Grâce to Maranhão, Brazil.
Flore	France	The ship was wrecked before 8 March. Her crew were rescued. She was on a voyage from a French port to Saigon, French Indochina.
Jessie Coffin	United Kingdom	The ship ran aground in the Hooghly River. She was on a voyage from Calcutta to Bombay, India. She was refloated on 4 March.
J. G. Dennis	United States	The fishing schooner sailed from Gloucester, Massachusetts on the 15th and vanished, probably lost in the gale of March 22-23rd. Lost with all 10 hands.
Klei Old Amt	Netherlands	The ship collided with Alabama ( (United Kingdom of Great Britain and Ireland) British North America) and sank off Cape Trafalgar, Spain. She was on a voyage from Amsterdam, North Holland to Naples, Italy.
Lady Leigh	United Kingdom	The schooner was lost in the "Benin Islands".
Leon	United States	The 87-ton sternwheel paddle steamer struck a snag and sank at Burnum, Arkansas.
Liberia	France	The brig was driven ashore 12 nautical miles (22 km) from Ningpo, China before 24 March. All on board were rescued by HMS Cockchafer (Royal Navy).
Light of Home	United States	The fishing schooner sailed from Gloucester, Massachusetts on the 15th and vanished, probably sank in a gale on the Georges Bank on the 22-23. Lost with all 9 crew.
Madras	United Kingdom	The ship was lost before 8 March. Her crew were rescued. She was on a voyage from Bangkok, Siam to China.
Mary Louisa	United Kingdom	The ship was driven ashore on Faro Point, Sicily, Italy. Her crew were rescued. She was on a voyage from Genoa, Italy to the Levant.
Mathilda Troon	United Kingdom	The ship foundered off the coast of Portugal.
Nawadaha	United States	The fishing schooner sailed from Gloucester, Massachusetts on the 16th and vanished, probably sank in a gale on the Georges Bank on the 22-23. Lost with all 9 crew.
Norman	United States	The ship was destroyed in the Shawnee River before 23 March.
Oliver Burnham	United States	The fishing schooner sailed from Gloucester, Massachusetts on the 16th and vanished, probably sank in a gale on the Georges Bank on the 22-23. Lost with all 9 crew.
Premier	United Kingdom	The ship was driven ashore at Mahaica, British Guiana before 26 March. She was on a voyage from Troon to Demerara, British Guiana.
Premium	United Kingdom	The brig was abandoned in the North Sea. She was on a voyage from North Shields, Northumberland to Hamburg.
Robert James Haynes	United Kingdom	The ship was driven ashore between "Sarso" and "Warnholmen". She was on a voyage from Sunderland, County Durham to Copenhagen, Denmark. She was refloated on 17 March and towed in to Mollösund in a sinking condition.
R. E. Spofford	United States	The fishing schooner sailed from Gloucester, Massachusetts on the 17th and vanished, probably sank in a gale on the 22-23. Lost with all 10 crew.
Royal Dane	United Kingdom	The ship was driven ashore Montevideo, Uruguay. She was refloated and towed in to Montevideo on 27 March by HMS Sheldrake (Royal Navy).
Seine	United Kingdom	The ship was driven ashore at Shoreham-by-Sea, Sussex, United Kingdom.
Shipner	United Kingdom	The ship was wrecked in the Agger Canal, Denmark. She was on a voyage from Hartlepool, County Durham to Aarhus, Denmark.
Silver Cloud	United Kingdom	The ship was wrecked on Hog Island, Bahamas before 14 March. She was on a voyage from Cardiff, Glamorgan to Nassau, Bahamas.
Singapore	United Kingdom	The ship capsized and sank in the Rangoon River. She was on a voyage from Rangoon, Burma to Singapore, Straits Settlements.
Star of Peace, and Susan Vittery	United Kingdom	Star of Peace was reported missing off São Miguel Island, Azores following a collision with Susan Vittery, which was severely damaged.
St. Nazaire	France	The ship was lost whilst on a voyage from Colón to New York. Her crew were rescued.
Susan Douglas	United Kingdom	The brig was wrecked at Samasana, off Formosa. Her captain and at least 10 crew survived. The gunboat HMS Bustard (Royal Navy) picked up the survivors from Samasana.
William Barnhill	United States	Towing barges carrying empty oil barrels, the 149-ton sternwheel towboat struck a canal aqueduct on the Allegheny River near Pittsburgh, and sank.
