= Peacefrog =

Peacefrog may refer to:

- Peacefrog Records, a British recording company
- "Peace Frog", a 1970 song by The Doors
- Peace Frogs, a branded apparel company in Gloucester, Virginia, U.S.
