= Oliver W. F. Lodge =

Oliver William Foster Lodge (11 August 1878 – 17 April 1955) was an English poet and author; he was the eldest son of Sir Oliver Lodge (1851–1940), the physicist, and his wife Mary (née Marshall), who had studied painting at the Slade. His five brothers all qualified as engineers, so that he was the only one of the boys with literary leanings, although their uncle Sir Richard Lodge and their aunt Eleanor Constance Lodge both became distinguished academic historians. They grew up in Liverpool, close to Sefton Park, and frequented the Rathbone family of Greenbank House.

== Life and works ==
He was educated at Eastbourne College, Liverpool University and the University of Paris. He worked as an architect with Detmar Blow for some years, but otherwise lived on a private income provided by his father.

O. W. F. Lodge's published works included What Art Is (1927); Six Englishmen (six tributes in verse, to Marlowe, Jonson, Shelley, Keats, Swinburne and William Morris); Summer Stories (1911), a collection of stories, prose poems and fables; Poems (210pp); Love's Wine Corked; a poem in twenty-four measures (1948); The Betrayer and other poems (1950); and The Things People Do, a collection of short stories published posthumously in 1966. He also wrote The Labyrinth: a tragedy in one act, based on Fair Rosamond by Thomas Miller (1847), which was first performed by The Pilgrim Players (which later became the Birmingham Repertory Company) in 1911.

Lodge married twice and had four children: Oliver (1922–2009) by his first marriage, to Winifred Atkinson, known always as Wynlane; and Belinda (1933–1996), Tom (1936–2012) and Colin (1944–2006) by his marriage, secondly, to the Welsh painter Diana Violet Irene Mabel Uppington (1906–1998).

Marrying after a 12-year courtship, Lodge and his wife Wynlane settled at Upper Holcombe near Painswick, Gloucestershire, in a farmhouse belonging to Detmar Blow. After Wynlane's death in childbirth in 1922, Lodge lived in Cheyne Walk, Chelsea, painting and writing, and frequented the Bloomsbury Group and the Catholic artists Eric Gill, David Jones and Sydney Sheppard.

Ten years later Diana Uppington arrived on his doorstep answering his advertisement for a nude model (she had already modelled for both Eric Gill and Duncan Grant, after a short spell on stage with the Tiller Girls). She asked him if he liked poetry – he replied that poetry was his life. After their marriage in 1932 they moved to a country cottage called Tanleather in Forest Green, Surrey, on the estate of Oliver's friend R. C. Trevelyan. Belinda and Tom were born there. Belinda's elder son, born in 1951, is the mathematician David Trotman. Lodge planned to settle in Paris with his young family in 1939 after spending a year in Valmondois with the anglophile French painter Charles Geoffroy-Dechaume and their families.

After the outbreak of the Second World War Lodge returned to England and then took his young family first to Canada, during which period Oliver and Diana got to know well Lynn Chadwick (later a prominent sculptor) and his first wife the Canadian poet Ann Secord. But very soon they moved to Maryland and settled in Virginia in the United States. Here Lodge taught English literature at various institutions including Ursinus College, Pennsylvania, Goucher College in Baltimore, and the College of William & Mary in Williamsburg. In Virginia, they first lived at "Bay Cottage", Naxera, until they moved to "The Little House", Elmington, Gloucester, Virginia.

On returning to England in 1946 Lodge settled near Painswick, Gloucestershire, at Cud Hill House, on the Hilles estate of Detmar Blow's wife Winifred and son Jonathan (Lodge's godson), where the family stayed until 1959.

After Lodge's death in 1955, his widow Diana Lodge changed her name by deed poll to Diana Kohr, taking the name of the Austrian economist and political scientist Leopold Kohr, who had befriended Oliver and Diana in Virginia during the Second World War. Diana changed her name back to Lodge in 1966 when she and Kohr separated. Lodge's will guaranteed his widow a sizeable income until she remarried, which was thus an obstacle to her eventual marriage with Kohr, as she explained in a 1993 television documentary about her life.

Some 200 letters written by O. W. F. Lodge to his father between 1908 and 1940 are held in the University of Birmingham archives, part of the Papers of Sir Oliver Lodge.

== Publications ==
- ‘A Song of Working Men’, Cornish Brothers, Birmingham, 1897
- ‘Summer Stories’, Cornish Brothers, Birmingham, 1911
- ‘The Labyrinth: a tragedy in one act’, David Nutt, 1911
- ‘The End of an Age’, Cornish Brothers, Birmingham, 1912
- ‘Spurgeon Arrives’, 1912 (a one-act comedy)
- ‘Poems’, Cornish Brothers, Birmingham, 1915
- ‘Six Englishmen’, Cornish Brothers, Birmingham, 1915
- ‘The Schooling of Trimalchio’, 1920 (a tragi-comedy in three acts)
- ‘Love in the Mist’, E. F. Millard, Painswick, 1921 (a book of verse)
- ‘The Pindar of Wakefield’, 1921 (one-act play)
- ‘The Case is Altered’, 1921 (one-act comedy)
- ‘What Art Is', Hodder & Stoughton, London, 1927
- ‘The Candle’, 1938
- ‘Love's Wine Corked; a poem in twenty-four measures’, Gloucester, 1948
- ‘The Betrayer and other poems’, Gloucester, 1950
- ‘The Things People Do’, published privately, London, 1966

== Sources ==
- The Times obituary, 25 April 1955
