= Edge Hill =

Edge Hill may refer to:

== Places ==
=== United Kingdom ===
==== Merseyside and Lancashire ====
- Edge Hill, Liverpool, a district of Liverpool, England
- Edge Hill railway station, Liverpool
- Edge Hill railway works
- Edge Hill University, named after its original location, Edge Hill, Liverpool, but now located in Ormskirk, Lancashire
- Liverpool Edge Hill (UK Parliament constituency), the relevant Parliament constituency

==== Warwickshire ====
- Edge Hill, Warwickshire, an escarpment and hamlet in Stratford-on-Avon district
  - Battle of Edge Hill, a 1642 battle in the English Civil War that took place near Edge Hill
- Edge Hill, North Warwickshire

=== United States ===
- Edge Hill, Georgia
- Edge Hill Farm, Georgetown, Kentucky, listed on the National Register of Historic Places listings in Scott County, Kentucky
- Edge Hill, Pennsylvania
  - North Hills station, formerly known as Edge Hill

==== Virginia ====
- Edge Hill (Gladstone, Virginia), listed on the National Register of Historic Places in Amherst County
- Edge Hill (Richmond, Virginia), listed on the National Register of Historic Places in Henrico County
- Edge Hill (Shadwell, Virginia), listed on the National Register of Historic Places in Albemarle County
- Edge Hill (Woodford, Virginia), the childhood home of United States President Thomas Jefferson, listed on the National Register of Historic Places in Caroline County

=== Australia ===
- Edge Hill, Queensland, a suburb of Cairns, Queensland
- Edge Hill State School, in Edge Hill, Queensland

== Other uses ==
- Battle of White Marsh, a 1777 battle in the American Revolutionary War, also known as the Battle of Edge Hill

== See also ==
- Edgehill (disambiguation)
