= Edgehill =

Edgehill or Edghill may refer to:

== Places ==
- Edgehill, Warwickshire, a hamlet on the Edge Hill escarpment
  - Battle of Edgehill or Edge Hill, a 1642 battle in the English Civil War
- Edgehill College, an independent school in Bideford, Devon
- Edgehill, Nashville, Tennessee
- Edgehill, Missouri, an unincorporated community
- Edgehill, Virginia (disambiguation), several locations
- Edgehill Mountain, San Francisco

== People ==
- Angus Edghill (1946–2025), Barbadian swimmer
- Chelsea Edghill (born 1997), Guyanese table tennis player
- Cox Edghill (1835–1917), British Anglican priest and military chaplain
- Ella Mary Edghill (1881–1964), British translator of Ancient Greek and Latin
- Ernest Arthur Edghill (1879–1912), British Anglican priest and theological writer
- Guillermo Edghill Jr., American record producer
- Juan Edghill (born 1964), Guyanese pastor and politician
- Richard Edghill (born 1974), English footballer and coach
- Rosemary Edghill (1956–2026), American writer and editor

== Other uses ==
- Edgehill (decryption program), UK counterpart to the secret anti-encryption program run by the U.S. National Security Agency
- Edgehill portrait, an 1805 painting of Thomas Jefferson

== See also ==
- Edge Hill (disambiguation)
