= Edgehill, Virginia =

Edgehill, Virginia may refer to:

- Edgehill, Gloucester County, Virginia
- Edgehill, King George County, Virginia

== See also ==
- Edge Hill (Shadwell, Virginia)
