= Money, Virginia =

Unincorporated community in Virginia, United States

Coordinates: 37°24′03″N 76°31′15″W

Money is an unincorporated community in Gloucester County, in the U. S. state of Virginia.
