= Hermitage, Virginia =

Unincorporated community in Virginia, United States

Coordinates: 37°20′29″N 76°35′45″W

Hermitage is an unincorporated community in Gloucester County, in the U. S. state of Virginia.
