= Marlfield, Virginia =

Unincorporated community in Virginia, United States

Coordinates: 37°26′51″N 76°36′35″W

Marlfield is an unincorporated community in Gloucester County, in the U. S. state of Virginia.
