= Harcum, Virginia =

Unincorporated community in Virginia, US

Coordinates: 37°31′06″N 76°30′19″W

Harcum is an unincorporated community in Gloucester County, in the U. S. state of Virginia.
