= New Upton, Virginia =

Unincorporated community in Virginia, United States

Coordinates: 37°30′30″N 76°30′46″W

New Upton is an unincorporated community in Gloucester County, in the U. S. state of Virginia.
