= SS City of New York (1861) =

Ship in Scotland

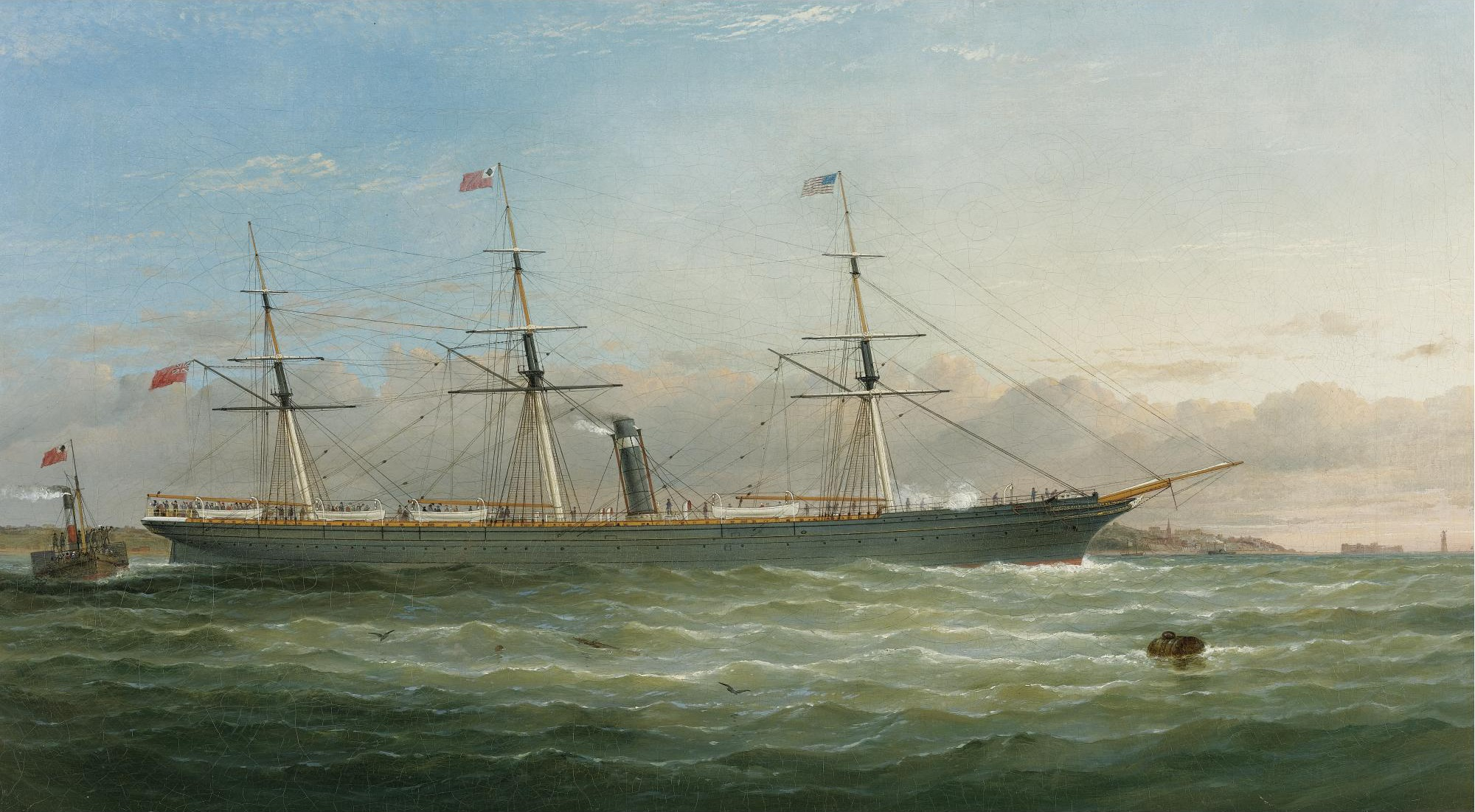
- SS City of New York

History
- Name: City of New York
- Owner: 1861: Tod & Macgregor; 1861–1864: Inman Line
- Port of registry: (United Kingdom of Great Britain and Ireland) Liverpool
- Ordered: 1860
- Builder: Tod & Macgregor, Partick, Glasgow
- Yard number: 107
- Launched: 12 April 1861
- Completed: 1861
- Maiden voyage: 11 September 1861
- Fate: Sank after hitting a rock, 29 March 1864

General characteristics
- Type: Ocean liner
- Tonnage: 2,360 GRT
- Length: 335 ft (102 m)
- Propulsion: 2-cylinder beam engine; single screw

SS City of New York was built for the Inman Line in 1861 built by Tod & Macgregor in Glasgow, Scotland.

== Service ==
City of New York was a luxurious steamer, based on the other ships like her that were built before her. (City of Glasgow, City of Manchester, City of Baltimore, City of Washington, Kangaroo, Virgo, Glasgow, Edinburgh, Etna) She was built for the transatlantic service, operating between Liverpool, Queenstown, and New York and sailed on that route from 1861 to 1864.

== Sinking ==
On 29 March, 1864, City of New York was sailing to Queenstown to pick up passengers. While in route, the ship hit the Daunt Rocks in the dense fog. However, all passengers survived the incident.

== Salvage attempt ==
After the grounding, there was an attempt to salvage the ship. However, it failed.
