= Clay Bank, Virginia =

Unincorporated community in Virginia, United States

Coordinates: 37°21′02″N 76°36′26″W

Clay Bank is an unincorporated community in Gloucester County, in the U. S. state of Virginia.
