= Baileys, Virginia =

Unincorporated community in Virginia, United States

Coordinates: 37°23′12″N 76°27′44″W

Baileys is an unincorporated community in Gloucester County, in the U. S. state of Virginia.
