= Signpine, Virginia =

Unincorporated community in Virginia, United States

Coordinates: 37°26′38″N 76°38′42″W

Signpine is an unincorporated community in Gloucester County, in the U. S. state of Virginia.
