= Gum Fork, Virginia =

Unincorporated community in Virginia, United States

Coordinates: 37°22′01″N 76°34′14″W

Gum Fork is an unincorporated community in Gloucester County, in the U. S. state of Virginia.
