= Pinetta, Virginia =

Unincorporated community in Virginia, United States

Coordinates: 37°24′56″N 76°38′18″W

Pinetta is an unincorporated community in Gloucester County, in the U. S. state of Virginia.
