= Hockley, Gloucester County, Virginia =

Unincorporated community in Virginia, United States

Coordinates: 37°23′44″N 76°27′38″W

Hockley, Gloucester County is an unincorporated community in Gloucester County, Virginia, United States.
