= West End, Virginia =

Unincorporated community in Virginia, United States

Coordinates: 37°26′16″N 76°41′57″W

West End is an unincorporated community in Gloucester County, in the U. S. state of Virginia.
