= Nuttall, Virginia =

Unincorporated community in Virginia, United States

Coordinates: 37°25′58″N 76°28′49″W

Nuttall is an unincorporated community in Gloucester County, in the U. S. state of Virginia.
