= Perrin, Virginia =

Unincorporated community in Virginia, United States

Coordinates: 37°16′13″N 76°25′27″W

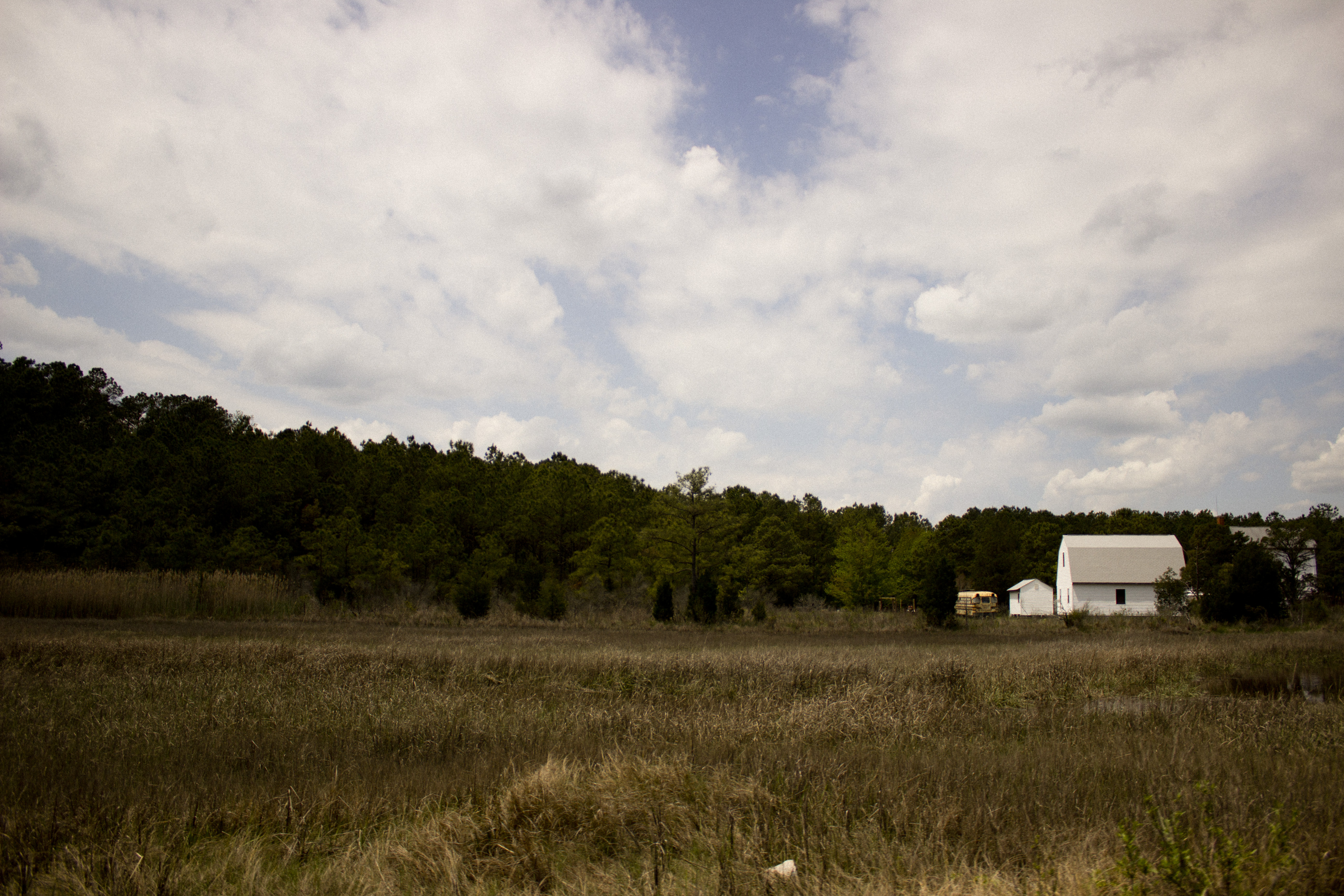
A farm in Perrin.

Perrin is an unincorporated community in Gloucester County, in the U. S. state of Virginia.
