= Millwood, Gloucester County, Virginia =

Unincorporated community in Virginia, United States

Coordinates: 37°21′53″N 76°33′01″W

Millwood, Gloucester County is an unincorporated community in Gloucester County, in the U. S. state of Virginia.
