= Roanes, Virginia =

Unincorporated community in Virginia, United States

Coordinates: 37°22′10″N 76°30′23″W

Roanes is an unincorporated community in Gloucester County, in the U. S. state of Virginia.
