= Schley, Virginia =

Unincorporated community in Virginia, United States

- Unincorporated community
- Location within Virginia Location within the United States
- Coordinates: 37°23′23″N 76°27′18″W
- Country: United States
- State: Virginia
- County: Gloucester
- Elevation: 10 ft (3.0 m)
- Time zone: UTC-5 (Eastern (EST))
  - Summer (DST): UTC-4 (EDT)
- ZIP code: 23154
- Area code: 804
- GNIS feature ID: 1500037

Schley is an unincorporated community in Gloucester County, in the U. S. state of Virginia. Schley is located 4.5 miles (7.2 km) east-southeast of Gloucester Courthouse. Schley has a post office with ZIP code 23154.
