= York View, Virginia =

Unincorporated community in Virginia, United States

Coordinates: 37°20′44″N 76°35′54″W

York View is an unincorporated community in Gloucester County, Virginia, United States.
