= Gloucester Daffodil Festival =

Annual festival in Virginia, U.S.

The Daffodil Festival is an annual celebration in Gloucester County, Virginia. The festival takes place in early April to celebrate the heritage and community of the county of Gloucester, as well as its heritage of daffodils. Gloucester's historic production of daffodils led it to be promoted as the "Daffodil Capital of America". The festival includes contests for Daffodil Queen, a parade, a petting zoo, scholarship awards, and other attractions. Approximately 8,000 people attend the festival annually.

From 1937 to 1941, a Daffodil Festival attracted tourists to the area to see the vast acres of yellow blossoms. In March 1942 the organizing committee suspended the festivities due to World War II. It resumed in 1987. It went on hiatus again in 2020 due to the COVID-19 pandemic, and returned in 2021.

== History ==
In 1651 Gloucester County was formed from part of York County. This flower began to grow around the county soon after. Gloucester County earned the title of "Daffodil Capital of America" in the 1930s and 1940s. Daffodil farms sprouted with bulbs imported from other countries. Gloucester was featured in National Geographic twice with pictures of townsfolk and daffodils. After World War II, a decline in growth occurred followed by a resurgence of daffodil production. This frenzy led to over-production and the eventual decline of daffodil production.

== Scholarships ==
The Daffodil Festival offers one four-year, renewable scholarship worth $100. The scholarship is awarded to a graduating senior from Gloucester High School. Past winners include Trip Vaughn, Sam Markwith and Kasey Koulhurst.

Scholarship awards are announced during the festival's opening ceremony. The judging criteria for the scholarships include a five-hundred-word essay, academic achievement, community involvement, school activities, and employment.

== Daffodil Queen ==
The Daffodil Queen is a parade staple and fulfills various responsibilities throughout the year, such as attending county meetings and other public events. Past winners include Nicolle Conry and Christine Riddett.

== Parade ==
The Daffodil Festival involves groups and organizations across Gloucester, such as the Boy Scouts of Gloucester, The Masonic Lodge, The Gloucester High School Band, and the Gloucester High School NJROTC Program.

== Vendors ==
Entertainment and vendors can include storytellers, magicians, musicians, and bands. Vendor categories are Fine Arts & Photography, Original Handcrafts, Merchandisers and Certified Vendor. The Fine Arts & Photography category includes original items and photographs created by the applicant. Original handicrafts are "items made by the applicant, which can be made from raw materials or incorporate manufactured items in the completed craft." Merchandiser includes "vendors that sell or display manufactured goods, services, or items that were made by someone other than the vendor." A certified vendor is "a vendor that has participated in the Daffodil Festival the previous year, has been judged as an acceptable vendor and has followed the rules of the Daffodil Festival. Their product must be the same as the previous year." Certified vendors receive a reserved spot and need not send pictures of their product.

== Rosewell Plantation ==
Rosewell Plantation has been the main attraction in Gloucester since 1916, when the home burned down. Built-in 1726, historians regard this building as one of the "largest and finest of American houses in the colonial period." This tourist spot attracts people all year.

== Children's Events ==
Children's events include face painting, a petting zoo, laser tag, and checking out a sheriff's vehicle while being taught about drunk driving and other dangers.

== Beaverdam Park ==
Beaverdam Park hosts the Daffodil Festival 5k and Rotary 2-Miler Fun Run. The 5k splits runners up by age and gender. The Rotary 2-Miler Fun Run is sponsored by the local Rotary Club. Located down Roaring Springs Road by Gloucester Courthouse, Beaverdam offers the only freshwater fishing spot on the Middle Peninsula. Beaverdam lake contains five major game species: Largemouth Bass, Bluegill, Black Crappie, Redear Sunfish, and the Chain Pickerel.
