= Carters Cove, Virginia =

Unincorporated community in Virginia, United States

Coordinates: 37°20′15″N 76°34′19″W

Carters Cove is an unincorporated community in Gloucester County, in the U. S. state of Virginia. To the inhabitants of Carters Cove it is known as "The Cove" or just "Cove".
