= Sassafras, Virginia =

Unincorporated community in Virginia, United States

Coordinates: 37°24′25″N 76°36′24″W

Sassafras is an unincorporated community in Gloucester County, in the U. S. state of Virginia.
