= Woods Crossroads, Virginia =

Unincorporated community in Virginia, United States

- Unincorporated community
- Location within Virginia Location within the United States
- Coordinates: 37°28′41″N 76°37′00″W
- Country: United States
- State: Virginia
- County: Gloucester
- Elevation: 105 ft (32 m)
- Time zone: UTC−5 (Eastern (EST))
  - Summer (DST): UTC−4 (EDT)
- ZIP code: 23190
- Area code: 804
- GNIS feature ID: 1477897

Woods Crossroads (also called Woods Cross Roads) is an unincorporated community in Gloucester County, in the U. S. state of Virginia. Woods Crossroads is located on U.S. Route 17 and Virginia State Route 14, 6.5 miles (10.5 km) northwest of Gloucester Courthouse. Woods Crossroads has a post office with ZIP code 23190.
