= Wan, Virginia =

Unincorporated community in Virginia, United States

Coordinates: 37°25′29″N 76°30′20″W

Wan is an unincorporated community in Gloucester County, in the U. S. state of Virginia.
