= Achilles, Virginia =

Unincorporated community in Virginia, United States

- Unincorporated community
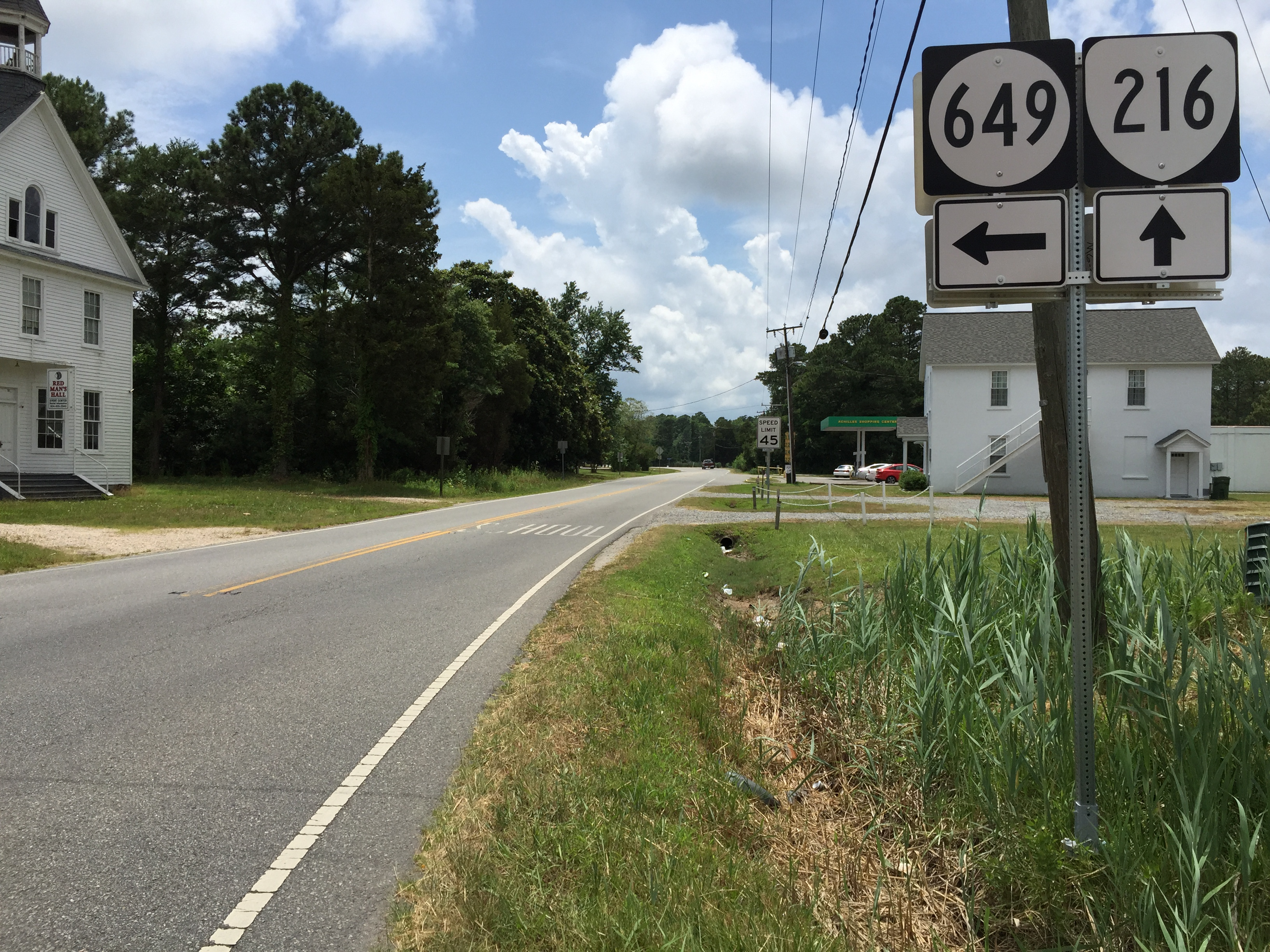
- View west along Virginia State Route 216 in Achilles

- Location within Virginia Location within the United States
- Coordinates: 37°16′49″N 76°26′25″W
- Country: United States
- State: Virginia
- County: Gloucester
- Elevation: 3 ft (0.91 m)
- Time zone: UTC-5 (Eastern (EST))
  - Summer (DST): UTC-4 (EDT)
- ZIP code: 23001
- Area code: 804
- GNIS feature ID: 1462355

Achilles is an unincorporated community in Gloucester County, Virginia, United States. Achilles is located on Virginia State Route 216, 3.5 miles (5.6 km) east-northeast of Gloucester Point. Achilles has a post office with ZIP code 23001.
