= Pampa, Virginia =

Unincorporated community in Virginia, United States

Coordinates: 37°31′34″N 76°35′34″W

Pampa is an unincorporated community in Gloucester County, in the U. S. state of Virginia.
