= Elmington, Virginia =

Unincorporated community in Virginia, United States

Coordinates: 37°25′29″N 76°27′20″W

Elmington is an unincorporated community in Gloucester County, in the U. S. state of Virginia.
