= Edgehill, Gloucester County, Virginia =

Unincorporated community in Virginia, United States

Coordinates: 37°24′47″N 76°31′08″W

Edgehill, Gloucester County is an unincorporated community in Gloucester County, in the U. S. state of Virginia.
