= Maryus, Virginia =

Unincorporated community in Virginia, United States

- Unincorporated community
- Location within Virginia Location within the United States
- Coordinates: 37°16′47″N 76°24′10″W
- Country: United States
- State: Virginia
- County: Gloucester
- Elevation: 3 ft (0.91 m)
- Time zone: UTC-5 (Eastern (EST))
  - Summer (DST): UTC-4 (EDT)
- ZIP code: 23107
- Area code: 804
- GNIS feature ID: 1470148

Maryus is an unincorporated community in Gloucester County, Virginia, United States. Maryus is 5.5 miles (8.9 km) east-northeast of Gloucester Point. Maryus has a post office with ZIP code 23107.
