= Freeport, Virginia =

Unincorporated community in Virginia, United States

Coordinates: 37°32′22″N 76°30′26″W

Freeport is an unincorporated community in Gloucester County, in the U. S. state of Virginia.
