= SS City of Manchester =

SS City of Manchester may refer to various ships, including:

- SS City of Manchester (1851), a 2,109-gross register ton passenger liner launched in 1851 and wrecked in 1876
- SS City of Manchester (1851 wooden ship), a 534-ton wooden ship built in 1851 and sold 1860 and in again 1863
- SS City of Manchester (1871), built in 1871 and lost off Ushant in 1885
- SS City of Manchester (1903), built in 1903 and scrapped in 1933
- SS City of Manchester (1935), built in 1935 and sunk 28 February 1942 by Japanese submarine I-153 off Java
- SS City of Manchester (1950), built in 1950, sold in 1971, and renamed Kavo Yerakes
- SS City of Manchester (1984), so named from 1984 and 1985, named Hassel Werder before and afterwards

== References cited ==
- Stephen P. Morse & Susan E. Swiggum. "None (List of ships named City of Manchester)". t.
