= Edge Hill (Richmond, Virginia) =

Historic house in Virginia, United States

- U.S. National Register of Historic Places
- Virginia Landmarks Register
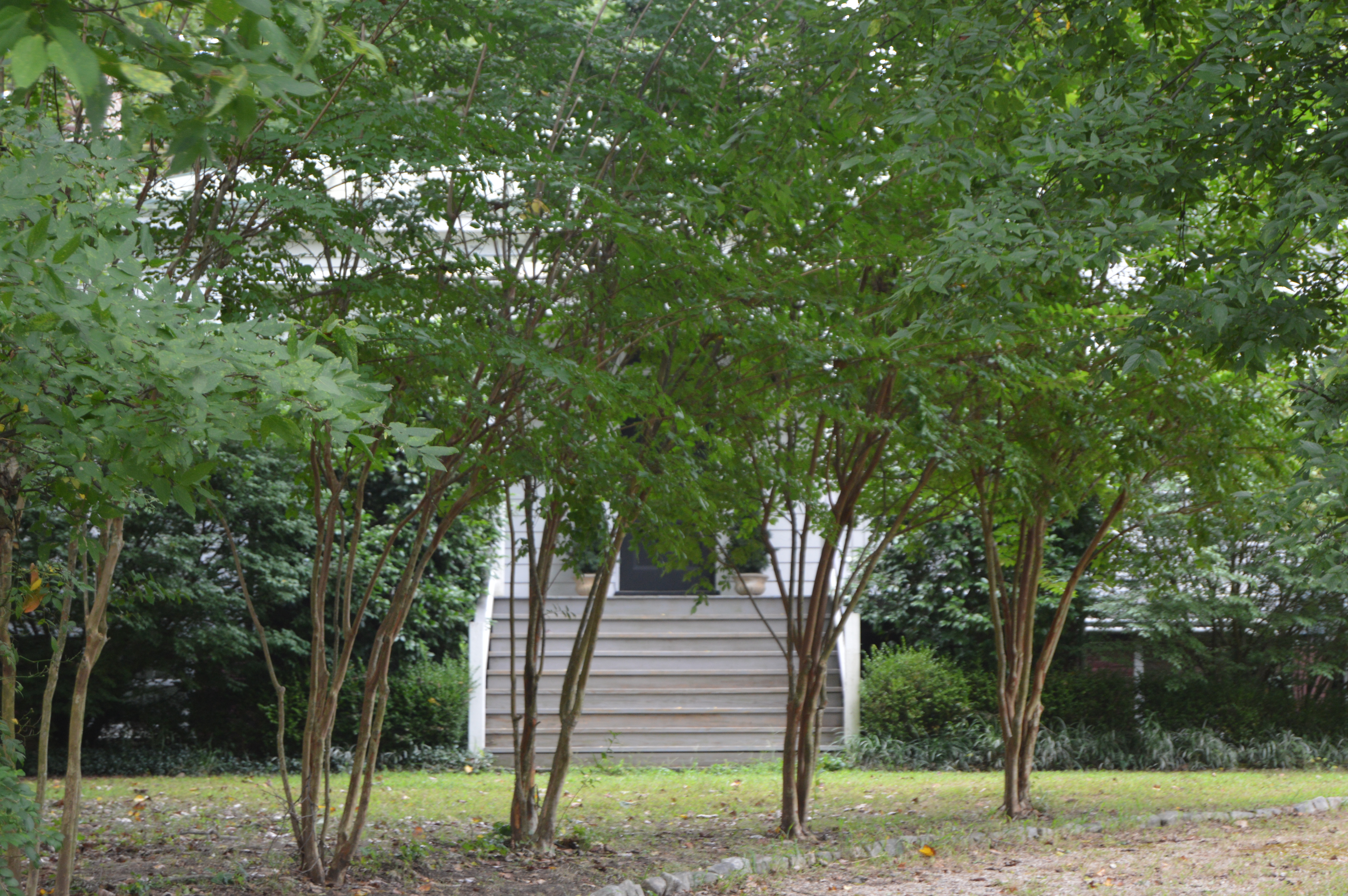
- Street view
- Nearest city: Richmond, Virginia
- Area: 3 acres (1.2 ha)
- Architectural style: Greek Revival
- NRHP reference No.: 08000243
- VLR No.: 043-0101

Significant dates
- Added to NRHP: March 27, 2008
- Designated VLR: December 5, 2007

Edge Hill, also known as Kennedy Home, is an example of Greek Revival architecture. It was listed on the National Register of Historic Places in 2008.
