= Peace Frogs =

- Type: Privately Held Company
- Industry: Apparel & Accessories
- Founded: Gloucester, Virginia (1985)
- Headquarters: Gloucester, Virginia
- Key people: Catesby Jones
- Products: T-Shirts, Sweatshirts, Pajamas, Hats, Bikinis, Stickers, Accessories
- Website: www.PeaceFrogs.com

Peace Frogs is an American company founded by Catesby Jones in 1985. Based in Gloucester, Virginia, it is a branded apparel firm that offers a full line of clothing and accessories with distinguished frog designs. It specializes in youth, teenage and young adults clothing. The frog waving a peace sign is the official logo for the company.

== Peace Frogs history ==
The company started with the production of multi-colored shorts with international flags and Peace Frogs was the name chosen for this concept. The founder of Peace Frogs, Catesby Jones, claims that the frog is an American Indian symbol for peace. As the popularity of the frog itself increased, the focus shifted from the flag shorts to the production of items with designs of the appealing amphibian.

== Products ==
Peace Frogs products include a variety of T-shirts, sweatshirts, pajamas, hats, swimsuits, stickers and other items.

In 2007, the company introduced organic cotton T-shirts to its brand line. Peace Frogs claims that the cotton used in their shirts meets rigorous organic certification standards put forth by the USDA, that they are dyed and finished without the use of environmentally harmful chemicals, and that the products are cut and sewn in manufacturing facilities committed to socially responsible practices.

In 1998, the company introduced a mobile retail concept. Volkswagen vans and "Beetles", painted in bright colors, travel from one commercial location to another, selling Peace Frogs products. The company owns a fleet of 25 branded units that can be seen at different malls, shopping centers, concerts and theme parks around the country.

== Frog studies ==
One of the concerns in the environmental world right now is the decline of amphibians. Recent studies revealed that in the last two decades there has been an alarming number extinctions and nearly one-third of the world’s amphibian species are threatened. The most important factor to amphibian population declines is habitat destruction. Peace Frogs supports various organizations that are strongly committed to this cause and other important environmental studies: Organization of Tropical Studies (OTS), Partners in Amphibian & Reptile Conservation (PARC), and others.
