= National Register of Historic Places listings in Gloucester County, Virginia =

Location of Gloucester County in Virginia

This is a list of the National Register of Historic Places listings in Gloucester County, Virginia.

This is intended to be a complete list of the properties and districts on the National Register of Historic Places in Gloucester County, Virginia, United States. The locations of National Register properties and districts for which the latitude and longitude coordinates are included below, may be seen in an online map.

There are 35 properties and districts listed on the National Register in the county, including 1 National Historic Landmark.

This National Park Service list is complete through NPS recent listings posted May 1, 2026.

== Current listings ==
	Name on the Register	Image	Date listed	Location	City or town	Description
1	Abingdon Church	Abingdon Church	September 15, 1970 (#70000796)	U.S. Route 17 south of its junction with Feather Bed Ln. 37°20′01″N 76°30′48″W	White Marsh	
2	Abingdon Glebe House	Abingdon Glebe House	September 15, 1970 (#70000794)	South of the junction of U.S. Route 17 and Burleigh Rd. 37°22′38″N 76°32′26″W	Gloucester	
3	Airville	Airville	December 6, 1990 (#90001824)	T.C. Walker Rd., south of its junction with Zanoni Rd. 37°23′14″N 76°30′13″W	Gloucester	
4	Burgh Westra	Burgh Westra	October 8, 1976 (#76002107)	East of Gloucester off State Route 3; 37°25′11″N 76°27′12″W	Gloucester	
5	Cappahosic House	Cappahosic House	April 11, 2003 (#03000211)	3198 Cappahosic Rd. 37°22′51″N 76°37′59″W	Gloucester	
6	Fairfield Site	Fairfield Site	July 16, 1973 (#73002019)	North of the York River; 37°20′28″N 76°33′14″W	White Marsh	Faced Carter's Creek until its destruction by fire circa 1900
7	Gloucester County Courthouse Square Historic District	Gloucester County Courthouse Square Historic District	October 3, 1973 (#73002016)	Main St. and Gloucester County Courthouse Sq. 37°24′53″N 76°31′47″W	Gloucester	
8	Gloucester Downtown Historic District	Gloucester Downtown Historic District	December 27, 2010 (#10001063)	Seven blocks of Main St. from the courthouse circle to Ware House Rd. 37°24′48″N 76°31′26″W	Gloucester	
9	Gloucester Point Archaeological District	Gloucester Point Archaeological District	June 10, 1985 (#85001251)	Off U.S. Route 13 on Gloucester Point; 37°15′00″N 76°30′00″W	Gloucester Point	
10	Gloucester Women's Club	Gloucester Women's Club	January 24, 1974 (#74002117)	On U.S. Route 17; 37°24′45″N 76°31′10″W	Gloucester	
11	Hockley	Hockley	July 9, 2010 (#10000446)	6640 Ware Neck Rd. 37°23′51″N 76°27′55″W	Gloucester	
12	Holly Knoll	Holly Knoll	December 21, 1981 (#81000640)	Off Allmondsville Rd. 37°23′16″N 76°38′38″W	Capahosic	Home of Robert R. Moton
13	Kempsville	Kempsville	December 21, 1978 (#78003018)	East of Shacklefords on State Route 33; 37°33′44″N 76°38′22″W	Shacklefords	
14	Kenwood	Kenwood	May 18, 2015 (#15000251)	7437 Kenwood Ln. 37°25′02″N 76°33′15″W	Gloucester	
15	Lands End	Lands End	November 6, 1974 (#74002118)	Southeast of Naxera on The Corderoy; 37°19′35″N 76°25′31″W	Naxera	
16	Little England	Little England	December 18, 1970 (#70000795)	East of Gloucester Point on Little England Rd. 37°15′14″N 76°28′45″W	Gloucester Point	
17	Lowland Cottage	Lowland Cottage	September 22, 1971 (#71001104)	Southwest of Ware Neck, 0.5 miles south of Ware Neck Rd. 37°23′49″N 76°28′02″W	Ware Neck	
18	Point Lookout Archaeological Site	Point Lookout Archaeological Site	May 19, 2014 (#14000234)	Mobjack Rd. 37°21′03″N 76°26′23″W	White Marsh	
19	Walter Reed Birthplace	Walter Reed Birthplace	September 20, 1973 (#73002017)	Southwest of Gloucester at the junction of Belroi and Hickory Fork Rds.; also 4021 Hickory Fork Rd. 37°23′18″N 76°35′17″W	Belroi	Hickory Fork Rd. address represents a boundary increase of December 15, 2015
20	Roaring Spring	Roaring Spring	September 22, 1972 (#72001395)	0.3 miles (0.48 km) east of Roaring Spring Rd. 37°26′00″N 76°31′27″W	Gloucester	
21	Rosewell	Rosewell	October 1, 1969 (#69000244)	5113 Old Rosewell Ln. 37°19′41″N 76°34′34″W	Gloucester	
22	Shelly Archeological District	Shelly Archeological District	July 12, 1990 (#89001932)	York River; 37°19′20″N 76°34′00″W	Hayes	
23	Site 44GL103-Quest End	Site 44GL103-Quest End	September 10, 1979 (#08000387)	5488 and 5476 Roanes Wharf Rd. 37°21′46″N 76°28′11″W	Selden	
24	Timberneck	Timberneck	September 10, 1979 (#79003041)	East of Wicomico off Borden Rd. 37°17′51″N 76°32′09″W	Wicomico	
25	Toddsbury	Toddsbury	November 12, 1969 (#69000245)	East of the junction of State Route 14 and Toddsbury Ln. 37°26′05″N 76°27′05″W	Gloucester	
26	Troop 111 Boy Scout Cabin		November 18, 2021 (#100007187)	6361 Main St. 37°25′00″N 76°32′08″W	Gloucester	
27	Union Zion Baptist Church and Pole Bridge Cemetery		April 8, 2025 (#100011648)	6145 Ware Neck Road and Pole Bridge Lane; 37°23′48″N 76°27′10″W	Gloucester	
28	T.C. Walker House	T.C. Walker House	December 4, 2009 (#09001050)	1 Main St. 37°24′47″N 76°31′19″W	Gloucester	
29	Ware Neck Store and Post Office	Ware Neck Store and Post Office	June 3, 2009 (#09000393)	6495 Dunham Massie Rd. 37°24′10″N 76°27′32″W	Ware Neck	
30	Ware Parish Church	Ware Parish Church	March 20, 1973 (#73002018)	Northeast of Gloucester on State Route 14; 37°25′21″N 76°30′27″W	Gloucester	
31	Warner Hall	Warner Hall	November 25, 1980 (#80004191)	Warner Hall Rd. 37°20′26″N 76°28′33″W	Gloucester	
32	Werowocomoco Archeological Site	Werowocomoco Archeological Site	March 15, 2006 (#06000138)	3051 Ginny Hill Rd. 37°24′38″N 76°39′20″W	Gloucester	
33	White Hall	White Hall	August 16, 1984 (#84003540)	White Hall Rd. 37°22′11″N 76°28′16″W	Zanoni	
34	Woodville School	Woodville School	February 11, 2004 (#04000042)	4310 U.S. Route 17; 37°19′30″N 76°30′54″W	Ordinary	
35	Zion Poplars Baptist Church	Zion Poplars Baptist Church	August 5, 1999 (#99000970)	7000 T.C. Walker Rd. 37°23′58″N 76°30′33″W	Gloucester	

== See also ==
- List of National Historic Landmarks in Virginia
- National Register of Historic Places listings in Virginia
