= Félix Rigau Carrera =

United States Marine Corps officer and pilot (1894–1954)

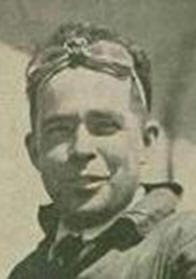
- First Puerto Rican to become a pilot
- Born: August 30, 1894; Sabana Grande, Puerto Rico
- Died: October 13, 1954 (aged 60); Gloucester, Virginia, U.S.
- Burial place: Abingdon Episcopal Church Cemetery in White Marsh, Virginia, U.S.
- Military career
- Allegiance: United States of America
- Branch: United States Army; United States Marine Corps
- Service years: 1914–1916 (USA) 1917–1919 (USMC)
- Rank: First lieutenant
- Nicknames: "El Águila de Sabana Grande" (The Eagle from Sabana Grande)
- Conflicts: World War I
- Other work: First pilot to fly on air mail carrying duties in Puerto Rico

Félix Rigau Carrera (August 30, 1894 – October 13, 1954), known as El Águila de Sabana Grande (The Eagle from Sabana Grande), was the first Puerto Rican pilot and the first Puerto Rican pilot to fly on air mail carrying duties in Puerto Rico.

== Early years ==
Rigau Carrera was one of nine siblings born to Felip Rigau Balbàs, a Spanish Navy sailor from Catalonia, and Carmen Carrera de Rigau, a Puerto Rican homemaker, in the town of Sabana Grande, Puerto Rico. There he received his primary and secondary education. As a child he showed an interest in mechanics and would often model aircraft, using the local cathedral as a launching pad for his small fixed-wing aircraft replicas.

After he graduated from high school, he enrolled at the Colegio de Agricultura y Artes Mecanicas (CAAM) (now the University of Puerto Rico) at Mayagüez and studied electronics and mechanical engineering. During his years at college, he continued with his hobby of building and designing airplane models.

After he earned his college degree in mechanical engineering, he joined the United States Army After serving in the Army, he traveled to Long Island where he finished his flying training

== World War I ==
After he earned his college degree in mechanical engineering, he joined the U.S. Army and was assigned to the Aviation Section, U.S. Signal Corps (the military aviation service of the U.S. Army from 1914 to 1918 and a direct ancestor of the U.S. Air Force). While in the Army, he traveled extensively around the world and became acquainted with many of the world's famous pilots of the era. He became the first Puerto Rican parachutist as a member of the Aviation Section of the US Signal Corps, whose members were among the Army's first parachutists. His stint in the Aviation Section, US Signal Corps inspired him to go and attend various aviation schools upon his release from the military.

Enlisted in the United States Marine Corps upon the outbreak of World War I. After receiving additional aviation training, he was commissioned a second lieutenant and assigned to the First Marine Air Squadron which deployed to France as the newly renamed 1st Marine Aviation Force in July 1918. There Rigau Carrera and his unit provided bomber and fighter support to the Navy's Day Wing, Northern Bombing Group. While serving in the First Marine Air Squadron, Rigau Carrera became the first Puerto Rican to pilot a fixed-wing aircraft and the first Hispanic fighter pilot in the Marines.

== Historical flights ==
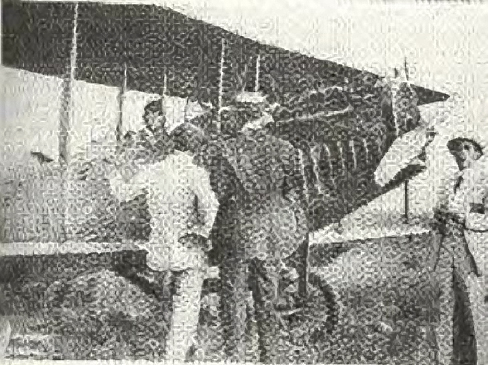
Rigau Carrera poses in his plane (1919)

In July 1919, Rigau Carrera went to Texas, where he met Bertha Dunston (1900–1989). They married in 1919 and had three children, Félix (1921–1995), Carmen (1923–2016), and Jaime (1925–1970) Rigau Carrera then returned to Puerto Rico and set about owning and flying his own aircraft. His four brothers helped him buy a Curtiss JN-4, $2,250 in 1919. The Curtiss JN-4 "Jenny" was one of a series of "JN" biplanes built by the Curtiss Aeroplane Company of Hammondsport, New York, and later the Curtiss Aeroplane and Motor Company.

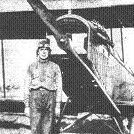
Rigau Carrera poses in front of his aircraft a Curtiss JN-4

Rigau Carrera piloted his first flight in Puerto Rico out of Camp Las Casas, where Residencial Las Casas is now, becoming the first Puerto Rican aviator. At the time, the area was used by the military and as Puerto Rico's only commercial airport. Rigau Carrera used the air base frequently, for exhibitions and sightseeing flights with passengers. He became a national hero in Puerto Rico during the 1920s, traveling to many Puerto Rican cities by air. The local town people celebrated his landings with live music and fireworks and he became known as "The Eagle of Sabana Grande".

In 1931, Rigau Carrera was given the first license by San Juan authorities to deliver air mail throughout the island. He then established a system like that used by airlines today, flying passengers from town to town.

Rigau Carrera almost lost his life during flights twice, once in San German and another time in Guanica.

== Later years ==
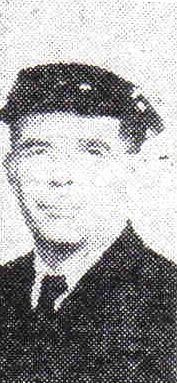
Félix Rigau Carrera

Rigau Carrera settled in Gloucester, Virginia, in the early 1920s. He lived with his family in an old Abingdon Glebe School House and constructed a building to house a flour mill and other enterprises. Rigau Carrera founded the Rigau Concrete Works which manufactured a wide variety of items to meet the industrial needs of the developing county. Besides concrete blocks, he cast septic tanks, culverts, burial vaults, and yard furniture. Rigau Carrera and his wife Bertha, who were certified undertakers, established a funeral home. He amassed a fortune as the owner of the funeral home and concrete factory. While living in Virginia he joined the Virginia Commonwealth USNRF (US Naval Reserve Force)

When the United States entered World War II, Rigau Carrera joined the United States Merchant Marine where he served throughout the war years. During these years, Félix and Bertha divorced. He met and married Estella Martins from the Azores of Portugal with whom he had three more children, Félix, Philip, and Maria.

Rigau Carrera died at the age of 60 and was buried with full military honors at Abingdon Episcopal Church Cemetery. His native hometown, Sabana Grande, named a street Calle Félix Rigau Carrera in his honor. On September 14, 2011, he was honored posthumously during the Hispanic Heritage Awards at Cleveland International Airport in Cleveland, Ohio.

The American Legion Post 36 in Sabana Grande, Puerto Rico, was named in honor of LTJG Félix Rigau Carrera.

In 2020 Félix Rigau Carrera was posthumously inducted to the Puerto Rico Veterans Hall of Fame.

== Military awards ==
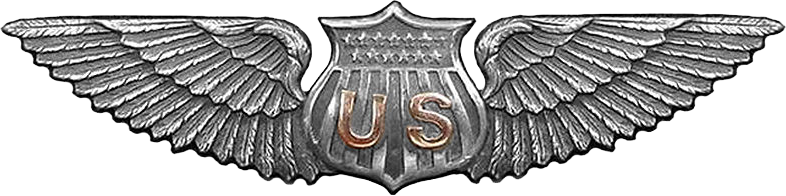
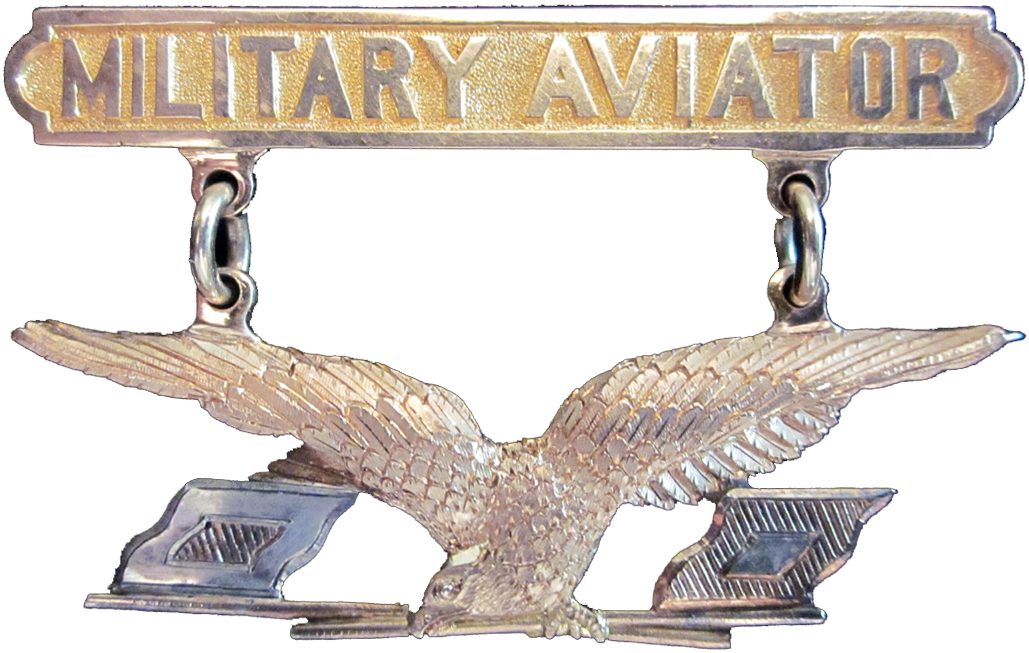

Senior Aviator Badge (World War I)
Naval Aviator Badge
Marine Corps Expeditionary Medal	World War I Victory Medal with 3/16" citation star	Croix de Guerre 1914 - 1918
Military Aviator Badge

== See also ==
- List of Puerto Ricans
