= Gloucester Historic District =

Gloucester Historic District may refer to:

- Central Gloucester Historic District in Gloucester, Massachusetts
- Gloucester Downtown Historic District in Gloucester, Virginia
- Gloucester County Courthouse Square Historic District in Gloucester, Virginia
