= White Hall (Zanoni, Virginia) =

Historic house in Virginia, United States

- U.S. National Register of Historic Places
- Virginia Landmarks Register
- Location within Virginia Location within the United States
- Location: VA 668, near Zanoni, Virginia
- Coordinates: 37°22′11″N 76°28′17″W
- Area: 6.8 acres (2.8 ha)
- Built: 1836
- NRHP reference No.: 84003540
- VLR No.: 036-0051

Significant dates
- Added to NRHP: August 16, 1984
- Designated VLR: May 15, 1984

White Hall on the Ware River near Zanoni, Gloucester County, Virginia, was the ancestral home of the prominent Willis family of colonial Virginia.

The Willises were one of the First Families of Virginia, with the first settler arriving by 1642. Other family members include the Francis Willis (academic) and Francis Willis (Representative).

The 2 1/2-story brick home on the property since 1836 was described as "an excellent example of the temple-form dwelling so popular in this region during the early decades of the 19th Century" in a 1984 nomination for the National Register of Historic Places.

"With its classical, temple-like mass, White Hall epitomizes the neo-classical spirit which pervades early American decorative art," the nomination adds.

The nomination, approved by the Virginia Historic Landmarks Commission, describes the home as a mix of original construction by Dr. Samuel Powell Byrd in 1836 and a series of renovations.

The living room and dining room contain "handsome colonial revival paneling" from a 1938 restoration but mantels that are much earlier with "quirked moldings, carried on flanking Tucsan colonetts" and the original doors opening on the front porch facing the Ware River.

White Hall sits on a 7-acre tract on the Ware River near the mouth of Wilson Creek and is reached by a long, curving drive lined with mature cedars.

The house is the successor to an earlier, one-story brick house built by the Willis family.

The land was patented in 1666 by Francis Willis, the first in the family to arrive in Virginia from Oxford, England. He served as a delegate from Gloucester County to the Virginia House of Burgesses in 1652.

Francis Willis returned to England and bequeathed the estate upon his death in 1690 to a nephew, Francis Willis. He is believed to have started the first house, which measured 56 feet by 22 feet. A wing added later measured 17 feet by 25 feet.

The nephew left the house to his son Francis, who became the head of a prominent Virginia family and served in the House of Burgesses in 1748.

The home is located about six miles southeast of the Gloucester County Courthouse and is one of several National Register of Historic Places listings in Gloucester County, Virginia. It is privately owned.
