= Holly Knoll =

Historic house in Virginia, United States

- Robert R. Moton House
- U.S. National Register of Historic Places
- U.S. National Historic Landmark
- Virginia Landmarks Register
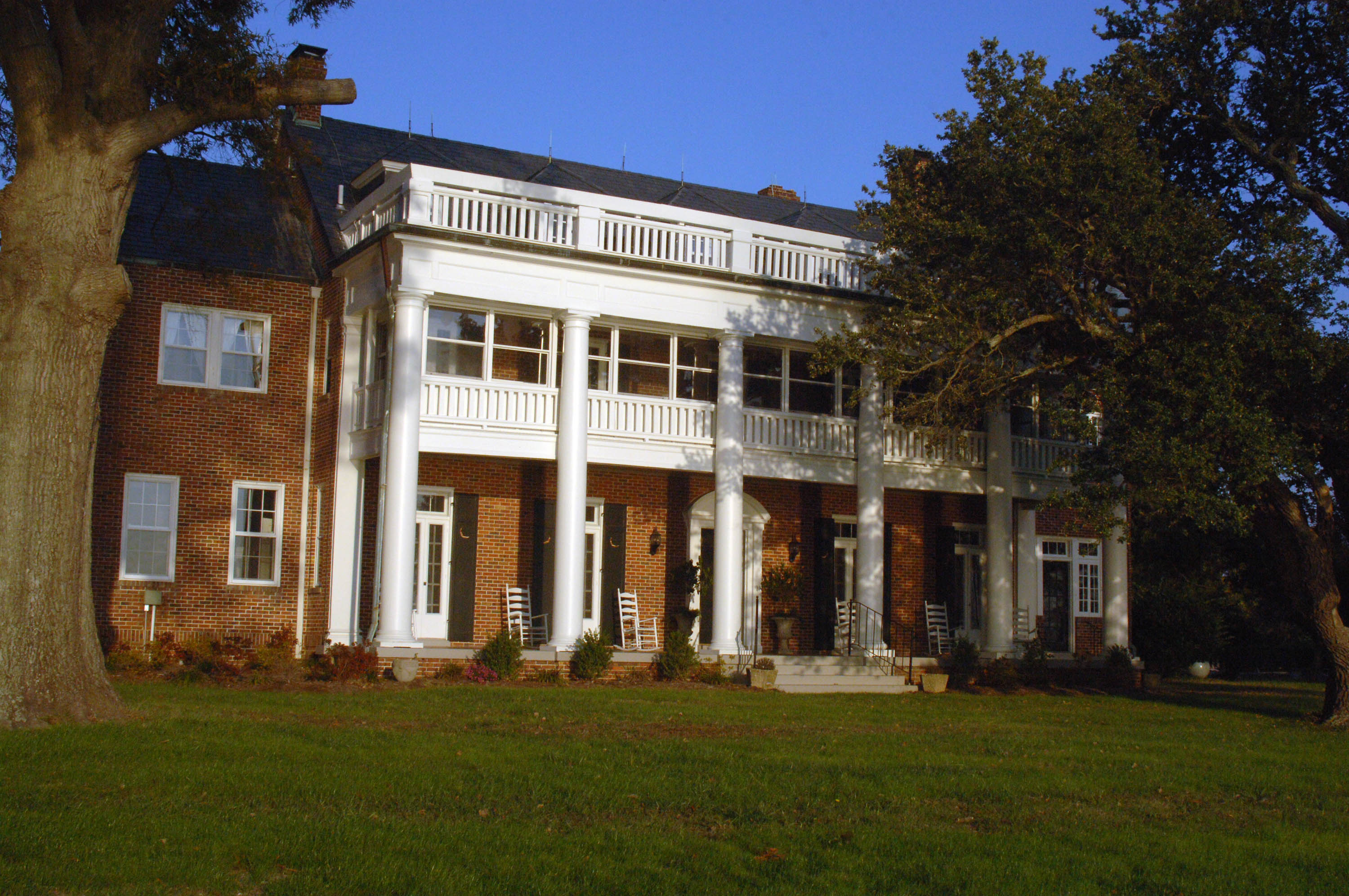

- Location within Virginia Location within the United States
- Location: 6496 Allmondsville Rd., Capahosic, Virginia
- Coordinates: 37°23′16.11″N 76°38′37.89″W
- Area: 1 acre (0.40 ha)
- Built: 1935
- Architectural style: Colonial Revival
- NRHP reference No.: 81000640
- VLR No.: 036-0134

Significant dates
- Added to NRHP: December 21, 1981
- Designated NHL: December 21, 1981
- Designated VLR: March 16, 1982

Holly Knoll, also known as the Robert R. Moton House, is a historic house in rural Gloucester County, Virginia, near Capahosic. It was the retirement home of the influential African-American educator Robert Russa Moton (1867-1940), and is the only known home of his to survive. It now houses the Gloucester Institute, a non-profit training center for African-American community leaders and educators. It was declared a National Historic Landmark in 1981.

== Description and history ==
Holly Knoll is located on the northeast bank of the York River, between the communities of Capahosic and Allmondsville. The main house is a 2 1/2-story brick building with a side gable roof, which is flanked by single-bay single-story wings. A two-story porch and portico extends across much of the facade, supported by smooth Tuscan columns. The interior is organized in a typical Colonial Revival central hall plan, and includes several pieces of furniture that originally belonged to Moton. The property also includes a reproduction of the log home in which Moton grew up.

The house was built in 1935 for Robert Russa Moton, and was his home until his death in 1940. Moton was one of the most influential African-American educators of his generation, succeeding Booker T. Washington in the leadership of Hampton University and the Tuskegee Institute, and helping found the National Urban League. The property was then transformed into a conference center, now The Gloucester Institute, dedicated to continuing Moton's educational legacy. It was at the center of strategy discussions amongst African-American intellectuals and activists during the Civil Rights Movement of the 1950s and 1960s.

== See also ==
- List of National Historic Landmarks in Virginia
- National Register of Historic Places listings in Gloucester County, Virginia
