= Kenwood (Gloucester, Virginia) =

Historic house in Virginia, United States

- Kenmore
- U.S. National Register of Historic Places
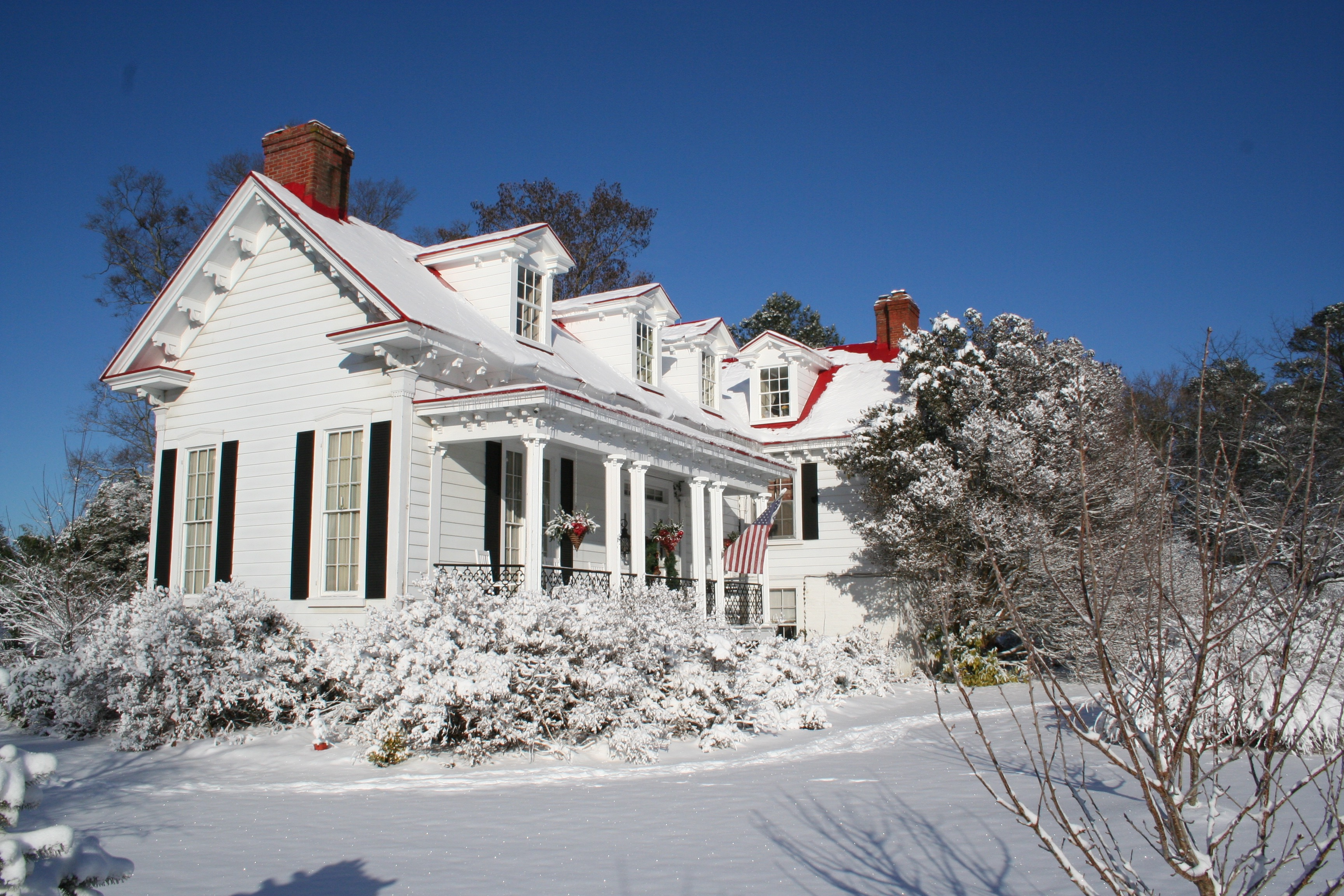

- Location within Virginia Location within the United States
- Location: 7437 Kenwood Ln., Gloucester, Virginia
- Coordinates: 37°25′2″N 76°33′14″W
- Area: 7.8 acres (3.2 ha)
- Built: 1800
- Architectural style: Federal; Georgian Revival
- NRHP reference No.: 15000251
- Added to NRHP: May 18, 2015

Kenwood is a historic 18th century property at 7437 Kenwood Lane in Gloucester, Virginia. The centerpiece of Kenwood is a three-story house, built in several stages of wood framing and brick. The oldest portion of the house is a Federal style wood frame section set on a brick foundation, with later Italianate brick and frame additions. The property also includes a period 19th century smokehouse and cook's quarters, along with other 20th century outbuildings. There is also remnants of a brick making facility at the far end of the property, near a tributary of Crany Creek.

The property was added to the National Register of Historic Places in 2015.

== See also ==
- National Register of Historic Places listings in Gloucester County, Virginia
