= Ware Neck, Virginia =

Unincorporated community in Virginia, United States

- Unincorporated community
- Location within Virginia Location within the United States
- Coordinates: 37°24′10″N 76°27′31″W
- Country: United States
- State: Virginia
- County: Gloucester
- Elevation: 10 ft (3.0 m)
- Time zone: UTC−5 (Eastern (EST))
  - Summer (DST): UTC−4 (EDT)
- ZIP code: 23178
- Area code: 804
- GNIS feature ID: 1476323

Ware Neck is an unincorporated community in Gloucester County, in the U. S. state of Virginia. Ware Neck is 4 miles (6.4 km) east-southeast of Gloucester Courthouse. Ware Neck has a post office with ZIP code 23178.

Lowland Cottage and the Ware Neck Store and Post Office are listed on the National Register of Historic Places.
