= Gloucester Point Archaeological District =

Archaeological site in Virginia, United States

- U.S. National Register of Historic Places
- U.S. Historic district
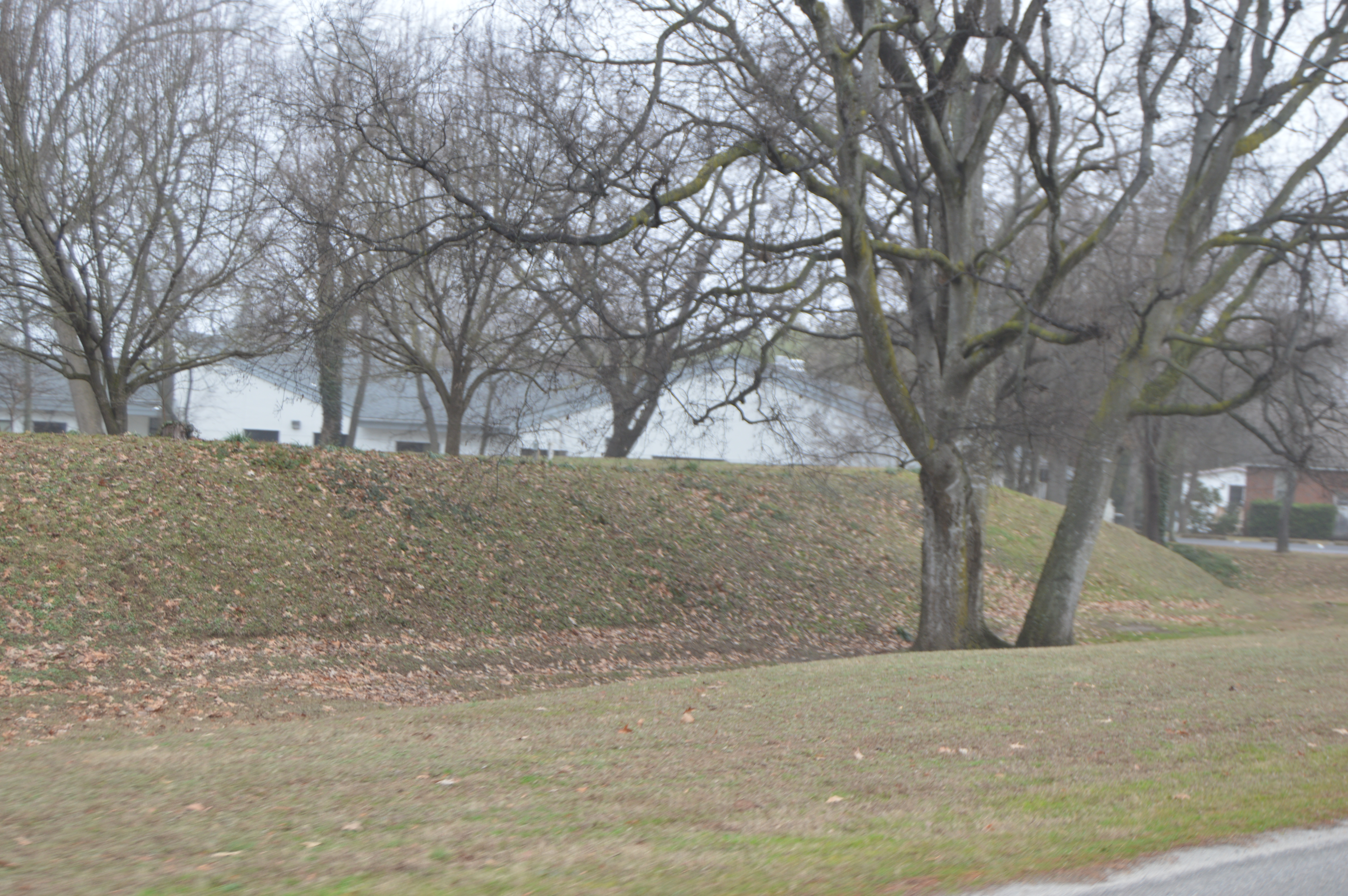
- Gloucester Point fort

- Location within Virginia Location within the United States
- Nearest city: Gloucester, Virginia
- Coordinates: 37.248146°N 76.503321°W
- Area: 59 acres (24 ha)
- NRHP reference No.: 85001251
- Added to NRHP: June 10, 1985

The Gloucester Point Archaeological District is a site at the tip of Gloucester Point, Virginia. The district includes the historic center of colonial Gloucestertown, as well as military sites from both the American Revolutionary War (when it was fortified by the British before the Siege of Yorktown) and the American Civil War. The site may also have remains of fortifications dating to the 17th century.

The district was listed on the National Register of Historic Places in 1985.

== See also ==
- National Register of Historic Places listings in Gloucester County, Virginia
