= Gloucester Downtown Historic District =

Historic district in Virginia, United States

- U.S. National Register of Historic Places
- U.S. Historic district
- Virginia Landmarks Register
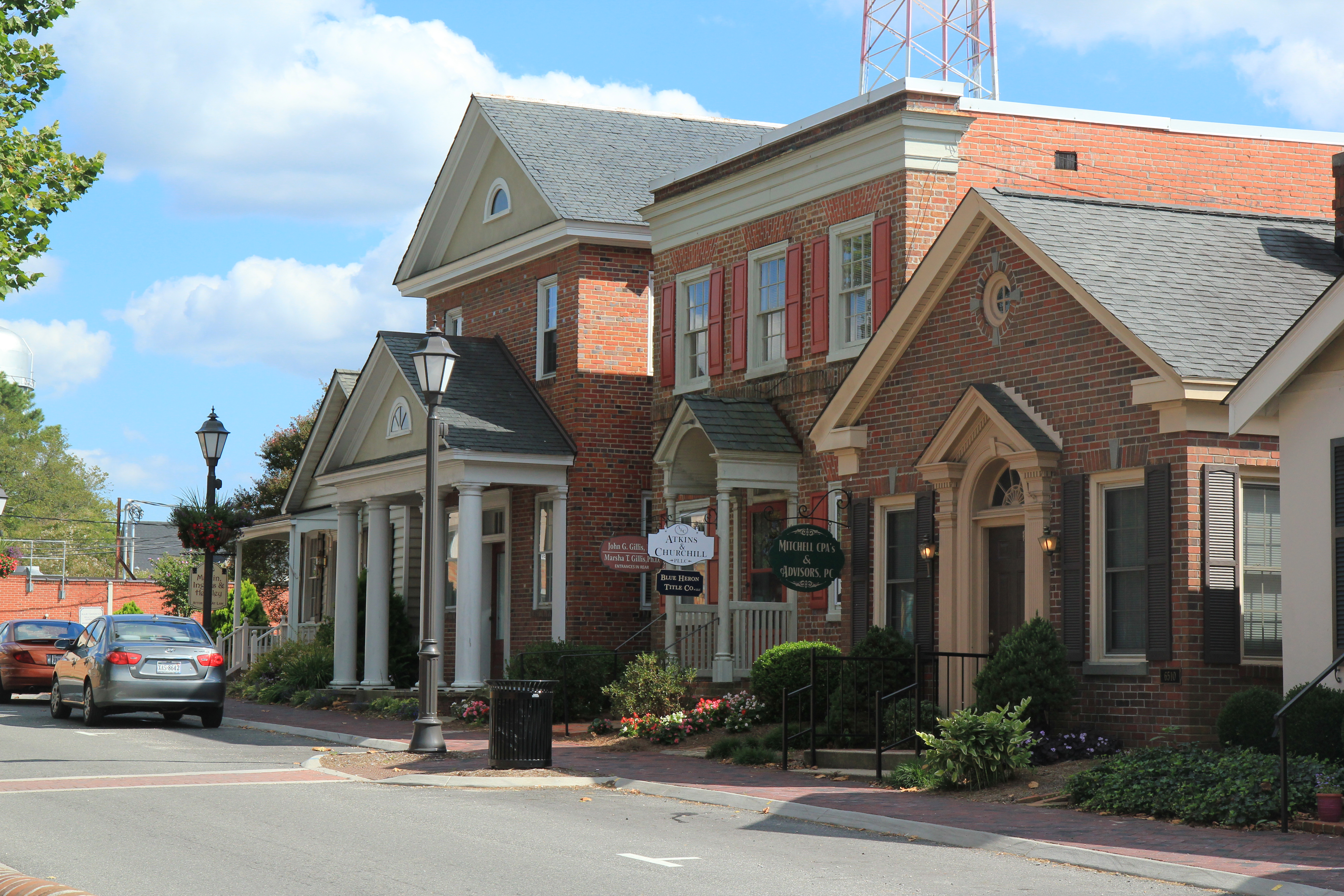
- Commercial buildings on Main Street

- Location within Virginia Location within the United States
- Location: Seven blocks of Main Street from the courthouse circle to Ware House Rd., Gloucester Courthouse, Virginia
- Coordinates: 37°24′48″N 76°31′26″W
- Area: 40 acres (16 ha)
- Built: c. 1766
- Architectural style: Multiple
- NRHP reference No.: 10001063
- VLR No.: 036-5106

Significant dates
- Added to NRHP: December 27, 2010
- Designated VLR: September 30, 2010

Gloucester Downtown Historic District is a national historic district located at Gloucester Courthouse, Gloucester County, Virginia. The district encompasses 57 contributing buildings and 5 contributing sites. It includes the central business district and limited residential development directly connected to the historic court circle (the Gloucester County Courthouse Square Historic District) and Main Street extending east to Edge Hill, to include the Gloucester Women's Club.

It was added to the National Register of Historic Places in 2010.
