= Burgh Westra =

Historic house in Virginia, United States

- U.S. National Register of Historic Places
- Virginia Landmarks Register
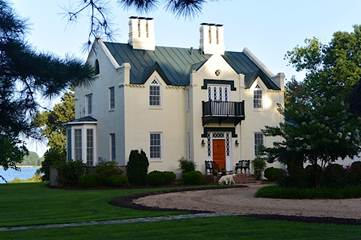
- Burgh Westra, May 2013

- Location within Virginia Location within the United States
- Location: E of Gloucester off VA 3, near Gloucester, Virginia
- Coordinates: 37°25′11″N 76°27′14″W
- Area: 550 acres (220 ha)
- Built: 1842
- Architectural style: Gothic Revival
- NRHP reference No.: 76002107
- VLR No.: 036-0010

Significant dates
- Added to NRHP: October 8, 1976
- Designated VLR: April 20, 1976

Burgh Westra is a historic home located near Gloucester, Gloucester County, Virginia. Built between 1842 and 1851 on 2,400 acres, the estate's original design is a two and a half story brick dwelling in the Gothic Revival style. In addition to the main house, the property contains an original dairy, a rebuilt carriage house, guest cottage, gazebo built upon original sketches of Dr Taliaferro, north and south gardens modeled on the original house designs, and a kitchen vegetable garden. Additional dependency foundations of the kitchen, smoke, and ice houses on the property are currently under consideration for reconstruction. Still noticeable in the spring are native daffodils planted around the entrances to originally wooden servant houses on either side of the lane. Aspects of the original fruit and nut orchards are located next to the estate and near the remains of a barn burned by raiding union troops during the Civil War. The extended property contains the original farm managers house and working and fallow fields along the estate's nearly 2-mile long lane. Burgh Westra's floor plan is Design III in Cottage Residences (1842), by Andrew Jackson Downing. The name "Burgh Westra" comes from the Scottish phrase for "Village of the West", symbolizing the cottage's location on the North River, Virginia.

Burgh Westra's builder was Warner Throckmorton Taliaferro of Belleville Plantation on the North River for his son, Dr. Philip Taliaferro. Dr. Taliaferro discussed potential designs and a desire to build the estate on the eventual land tract while studying medicine in Scotland, Dublin, and London (receiving his degree from William Wilde, at Trinity College Dublin. During the Civil War, Dr. Taliaferro, the nephew of Confederate Secretary of War James Seddon, accompanied his half-brother, William B. Taliaferro, a general in the Confederate army, to serve with General Stonewall Jackson (1824–1863) in the Shenandoah Valley as an aide-de-camp. William B. Taliaferro commanded Jackson's division at Cedar Mountain, Second Manassas and Fredericksburg. He commanded Fort Wagner, SC (famous for the movie Glory), served on James Island, SC, and in Florida and Georgia (as head of the Confederate army in Savannah). Upon returning to Burgh Westra during the war, Dr. Taliaferro opened up his estate as a hospital for wounded soldiers of both sides. The estates lawns were the site of occasional Union troop encampments during the war. At least two unidentified confederate soldiers who died at Burgh Westra are buried at nearby Ware Episcopal Church which union troops used as a stable during the war. Remains of soldiers have on occasion been found near the shoreline as recently as the 1950s.

Additional family owners include Beverly Randolph Wellford Jr, son of Beverly Randolph Wellford and Henry Alexander White.

The home continues to be owned by the original family, and is suspected to be the oldest continual ownership of a house in Gloucester County, Virginia. The family has owned this and other land tracts and estates on the North River dating back to the early 1600s. Burgh Westra was added to the National Register of Historic Places in 1976. it contains many rare antiques including some of the only furniture from the original Randolph family estate, Turkey Island Plantation, and a Thomas Sully of Susan Seddon Taliaferro.

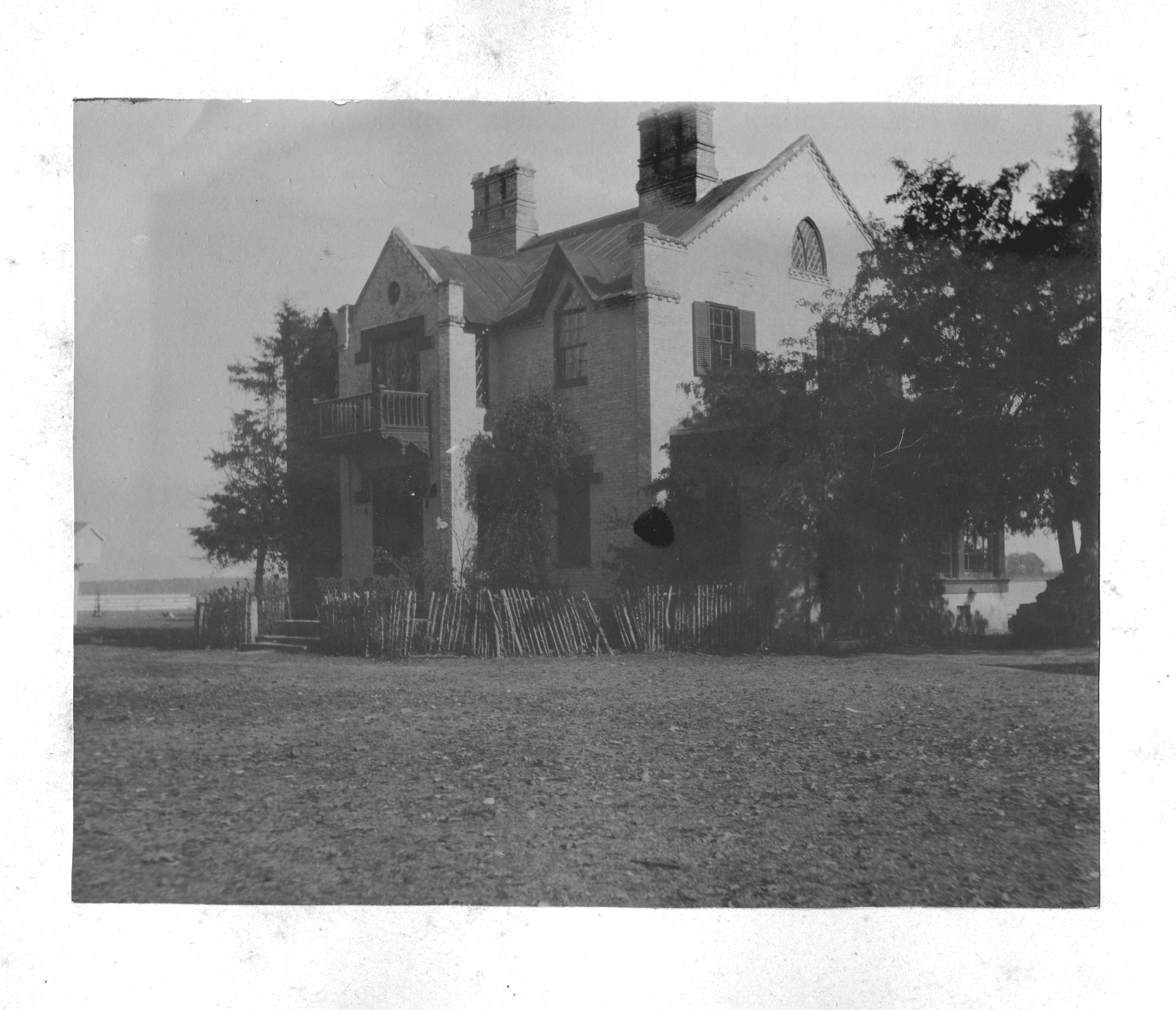
Burgh Westra about 1870

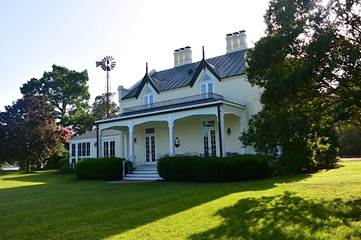
Burgh Westra Water side

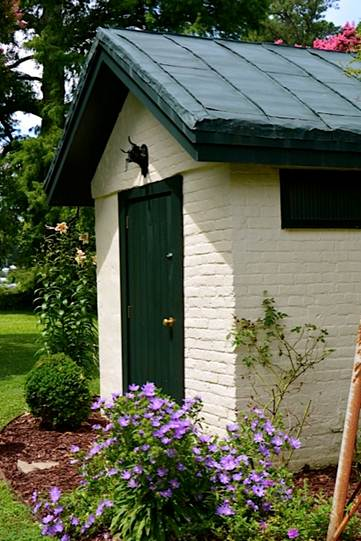
Burgh Westra Dairy
