= Zion Poplars Baptist Church =

Historic church in Virginia, United States

- U.S. National Register of Historic Places
- Virginia Landmarks Register
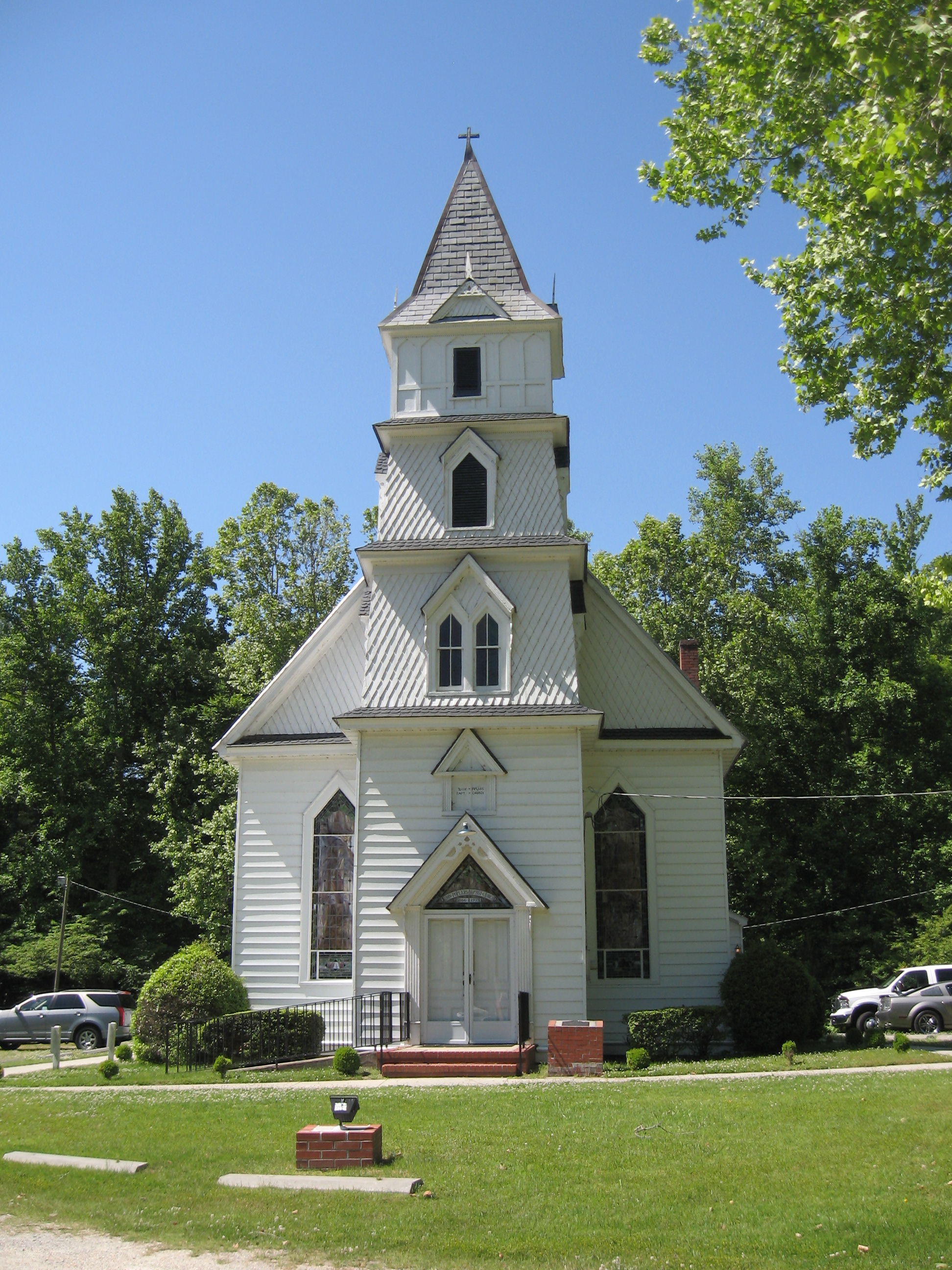

- Location within Virginia Location within the United States
- Location: 7000 T.C. Walker Rd., Gloucester, Virginia
- Coordinates: 37°23′58″N 76°30′33″W
- Built: 1894
- Architect: Braxton, Frank
- Architectural style: Gothic Revival
- NRHP reference No.: 99000970
- VLR No.: 036-5001

Significant dates
- Added to NRHP: August 05, 1999
- Designated VLR: June 16, 1999

Zion Poplars Baptist Church is a historic Baptist church located near Gloucester, Gloucester County, Virginia. It was built in 1894 during the Reconstruction Era, and served more than just religious functions. As one of the oldest independent African American congregations in Gloucester County, Virginia, the church also served the economic and educational needs of its community. It was built in the Gothic Revival style with vernacular detailing, attributed to the handiwork of Frank Braxton, a former slave. The church gained its name from the historical origins of the church and congregation, because the first services were held under seven united poplar trees. Four of these trees still stand on church grounds today.

It was added to the National Register of Historic Places in 1999.

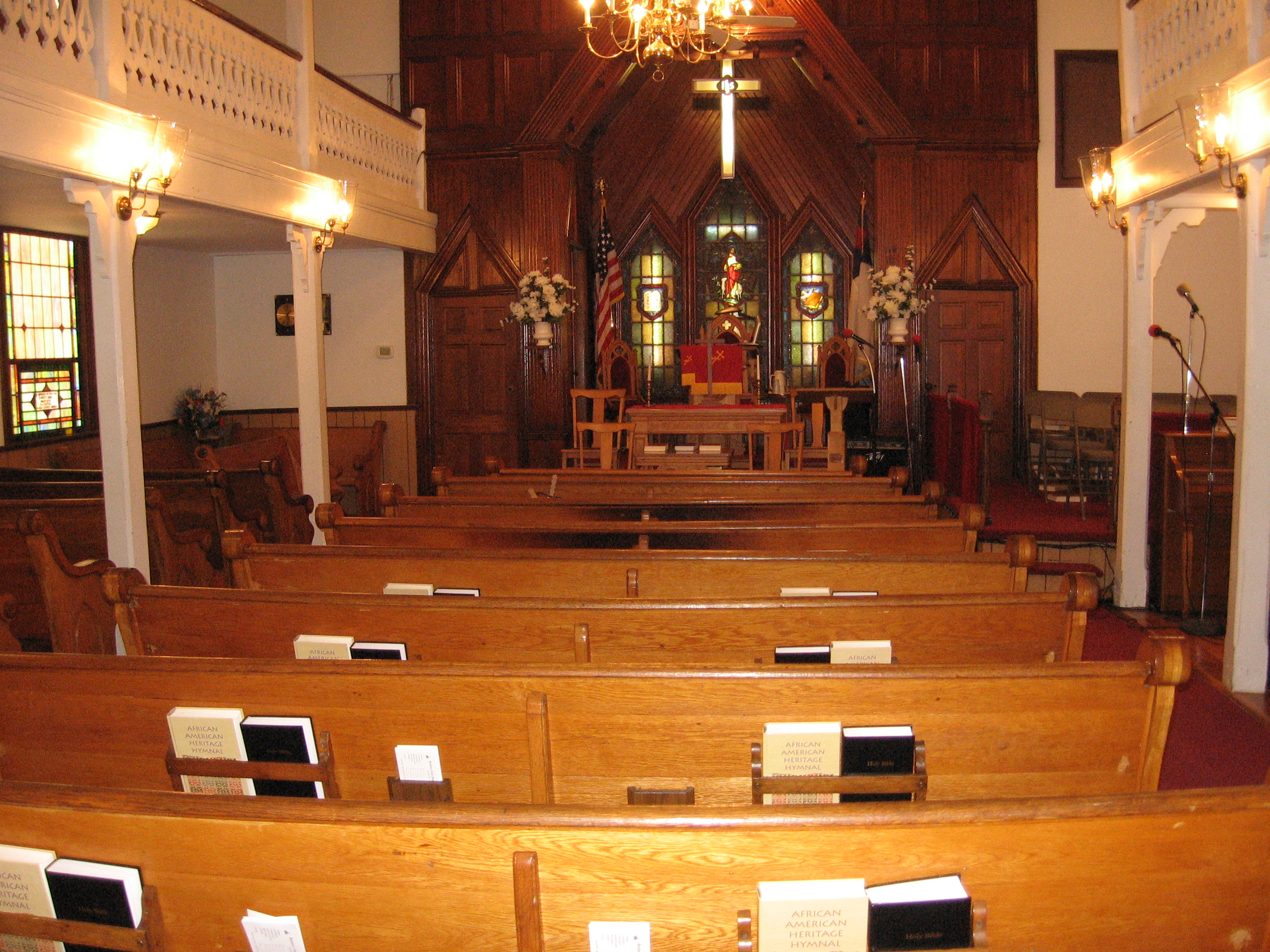
Inside of the church
