= Airville =

Historic house in Virginia, United States

- U.S. National Register of Historic Places
- Virginia Landmarks Register
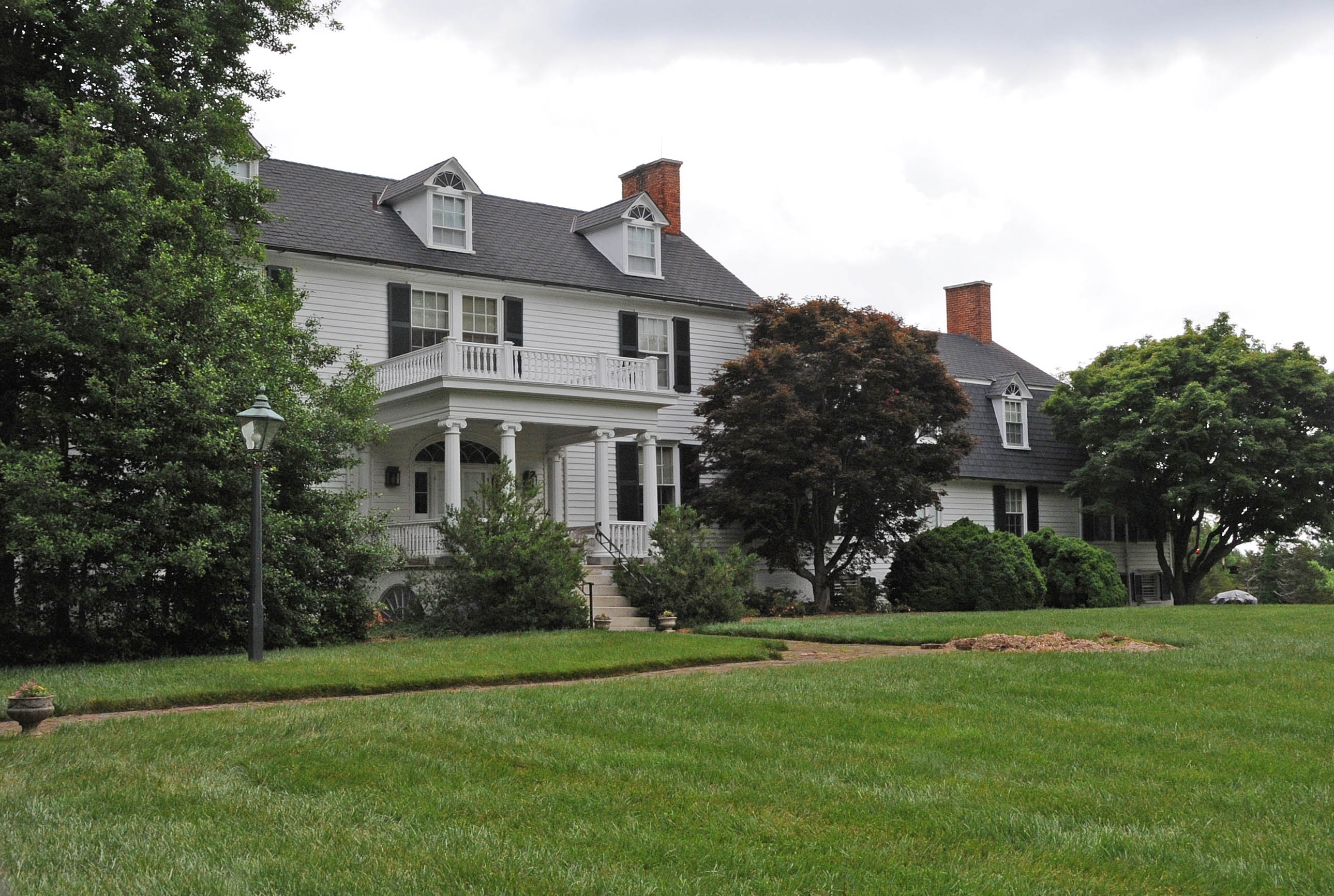

- Location within Virginia Location within the United States
- Location: VA 629 S of jct. with VA 626, near Gloucester, Virginia
- Coordinates: 37°23′12″N 76°30′15″W
- Area: 45.4 acres (18.4 ha)
- Built by: Longest, James; Stone, C.F.
- Architectural style: Greek Revival, Federal
- NRHP reference No.: 90001824
- VLR No.: 036-0003

Significant dates
- Added to NRHP: December 6, 1990
- Designated VLR: October 16, 1990

Airville is a historic frame home located near Gloucester, Gloucester County, Virginia, added to the National Register of Historic Places in 1990.

== History ==
Five generations of men named "John Dixon" may have lived at the site during the 18th century, the first man having emigrated from Bristol, England and married Lucy Reade (1701-1731), whose father owned land in Gloucester County and who gave birth to three sons, before her death (and her husband's remarriage, and additional children). The eldest son, Rev. John Dixon, served as rector of Kingston Parish, then became a professor at the College of William and Mary. He also had three sons, and two daughters. His son John Dixon (d. 1788) married the daughter of Sir John Peyton of Islington in Gloucester County, who led the county militia during the American Revolutionary War. He may have been the John Dixon who served in the Virginia Senate representing Gloucester and adjacent Middlesex Counties 1780-1782. Their son John Dixon (d. 1830) married twice, and had three daughters and a son who became a medical doctor (1812-1835) by his first wife (Sarah Throckmorton). The family's papers are now held by the College of William and Mary.

Prominent merchant and politician Thomas Smith acquired Airville from the estate, renovated it and added a three story addition.

== Architecture ==
The earliest section, initially one story, has a central-passage plan and gambrel roof. The second section is a three-story, frame addition dated to the late-1830s. It features a Greek Revival style front porch with fluted-Ionic order columns. Also on the property are the contributing dairy, smokehouse, office, lumber house, and icehouse.
