= Lowland Cottage =

Historic house in Virginia, United States

- U.S. National Register of Historic Places
- Virginia Landmarks Register
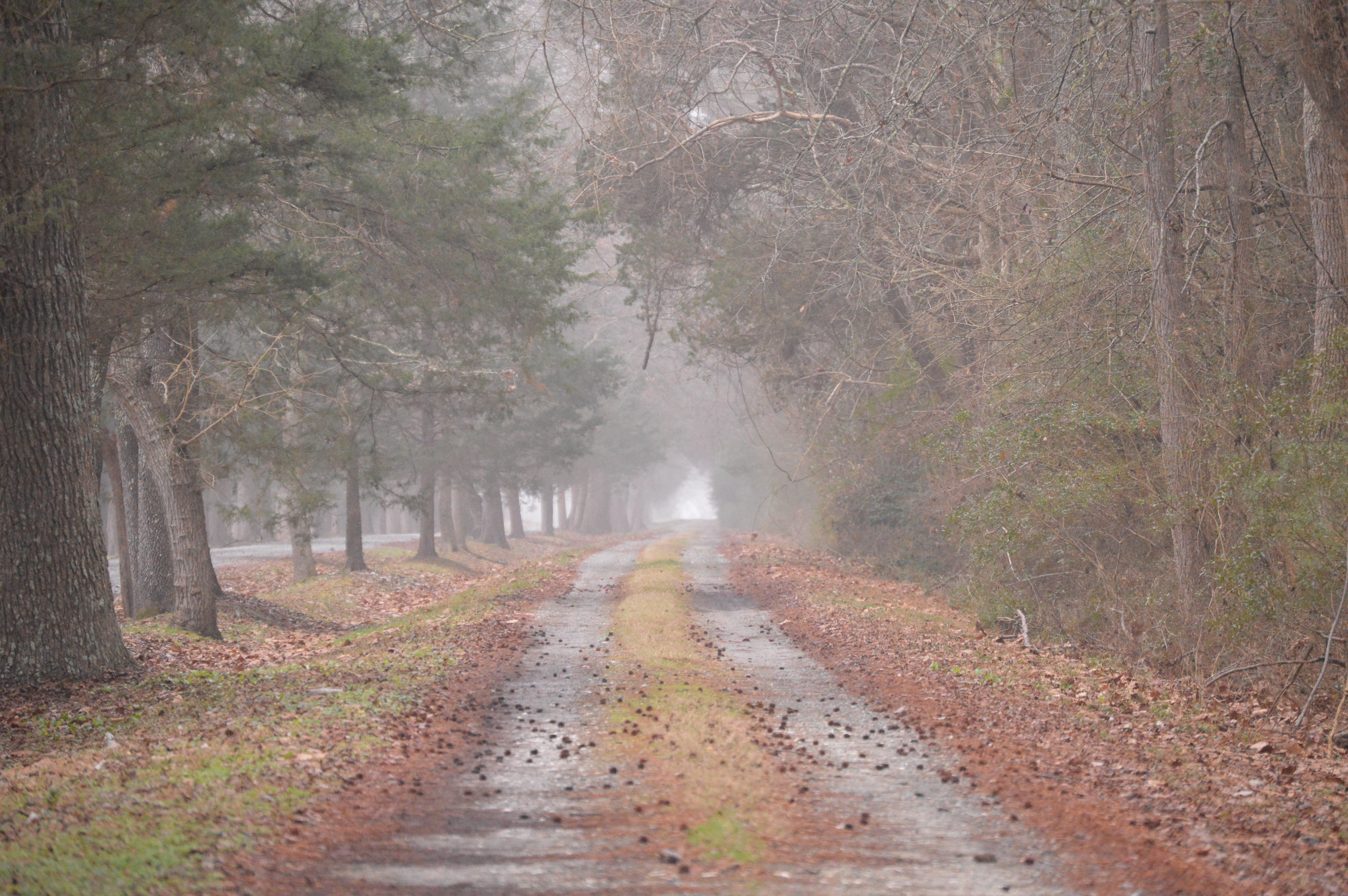
- Property entrance

- Location within Virginia Location within the United States
- Nearest city: SW of Ware Neck, 0.5 mi. S of VA 623, near Ware Neck, Virginia
- Coordinates: 37°24′04″N 76°28′06″W
- Area: 40 acres (16 ha)
- Built: 1671
- NRHP reference No.: 71001104
- VLR No.: 036-0032

Significant dates
- Added to NRHP: September 22, 1971
- Designated VLR: April 6, 1971

Lowland Cottage is a historic home located near Ware Neck, Gloucester County, Virginia. The main and earliest part of the house, considered to have been built between 1666 and 1676, is a gambrel roofed, 1 1/2-story structure, approximately 40 feet by 20 feet. Sometime between 1783 and 1831 Lowland Cottage received two additions: a 1 1/2-story gambrel-roofed wing on the east end, and a two-story wing on the north side. The house was remodeled in 1935.

It was added to the National Register of Historic Places in 1971.

== See also ==
- List of the oldest buildings in Virginia
