= Abingdon Church =

Historic church in Virginia, US

- U.S. National Register of Historic Places
- Virginia Landmarks Register
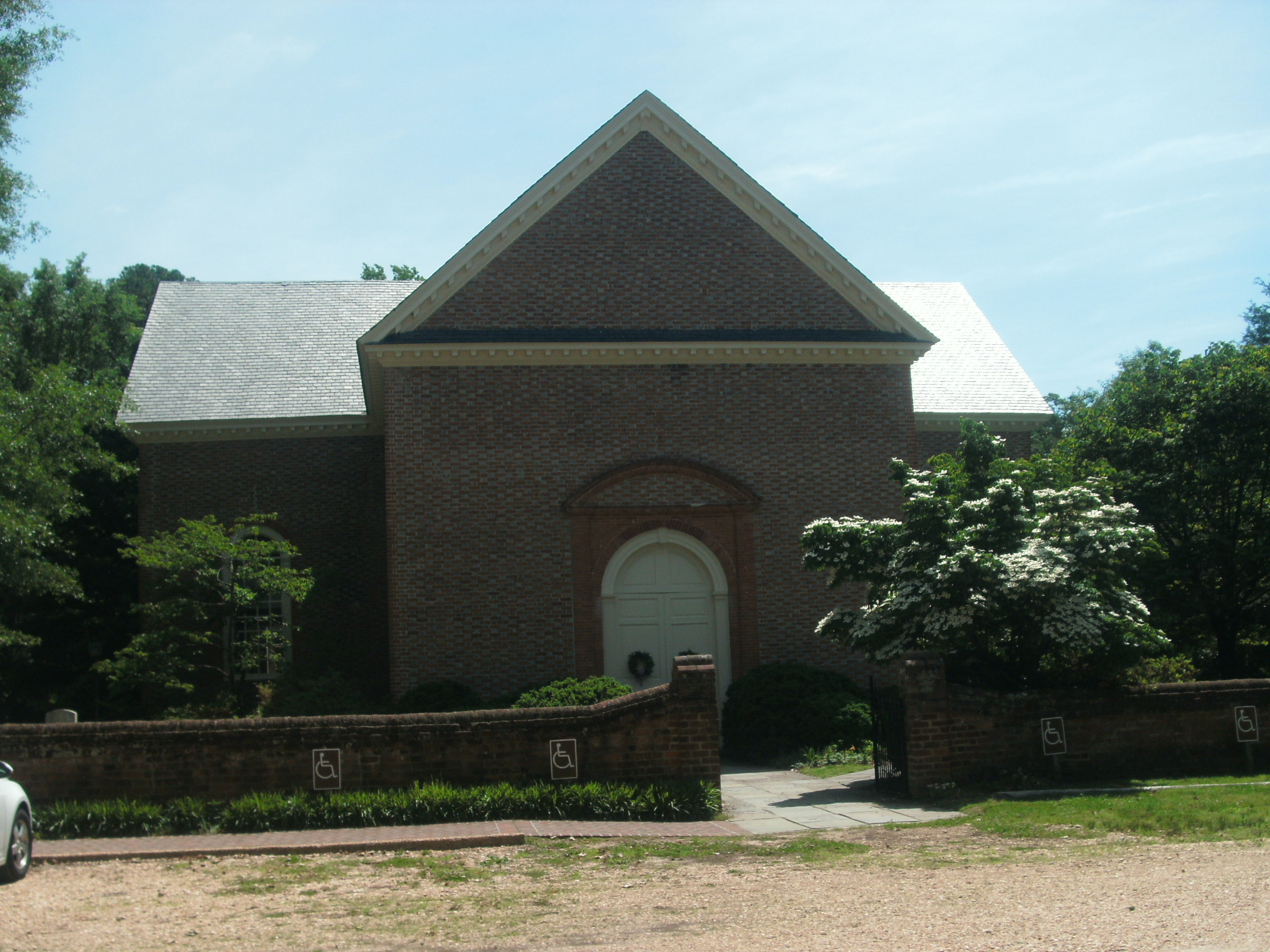
- Abingdon Church, seen in 2013

- Location within Virginia Location within the United States
- Location: U.S. 17, S of jct. with VA 614, near White Marsh, Virginia
- Coordinates: 37°20′00″N 76°30′49″W
- Area: 10 acres (4.0 ha)
- Built: 1754
- Architectural style: Colonial
- NRHP reference No.: 70000796
- VLR No.: 036-0001

Significant dates
- Added to NRHP: September 15, 1970
- Designated VLR: July 7, 1970

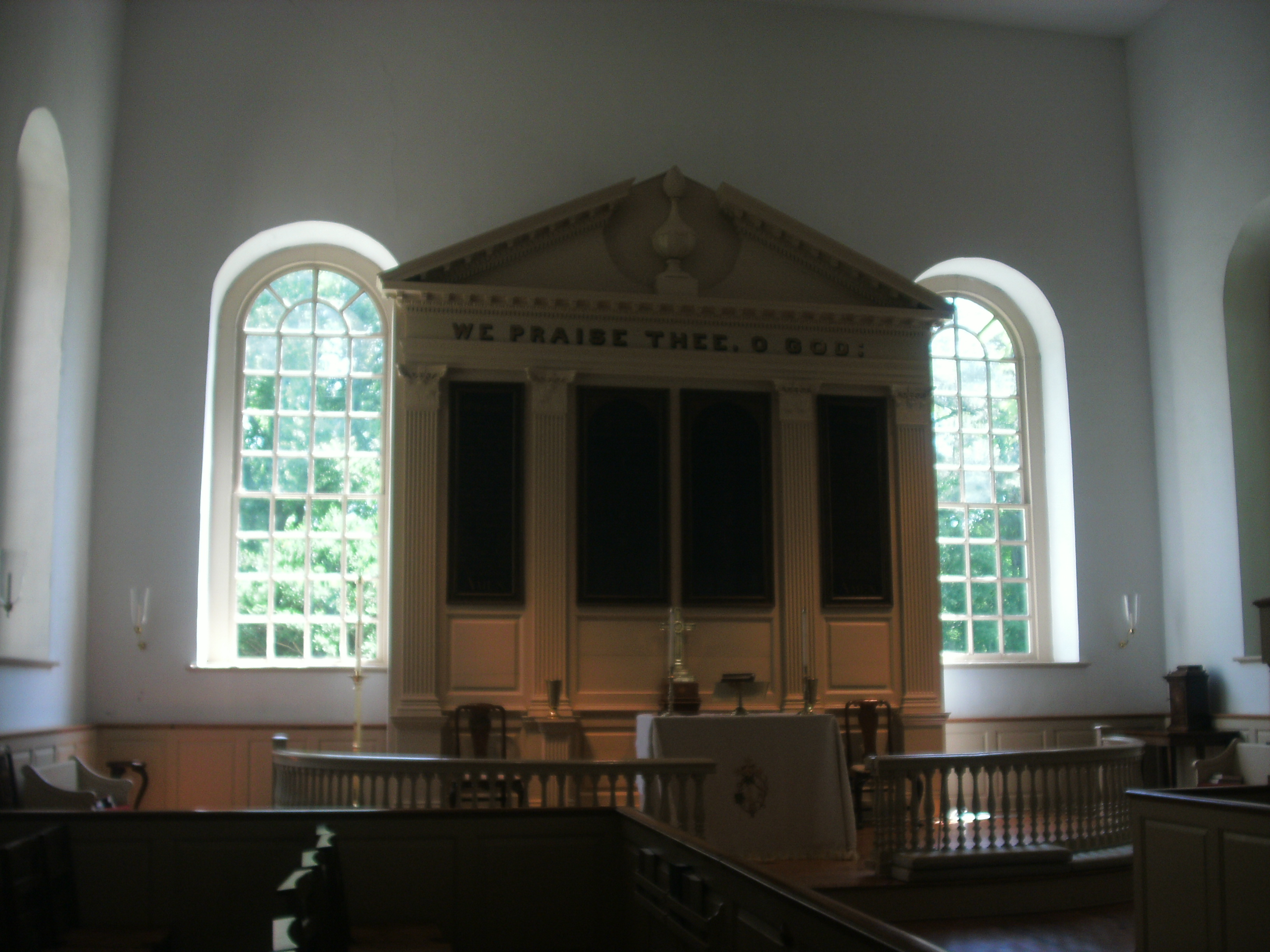
Church interior

Abingdon Church is a historic Episcopal church located near White Marsh, Gloucester County, Virginia. It and the Abingdon Glebe House are among the oldest buildings in Virginia and were added to the National Register of Historic Places in 1970.

The parish was established shortly after the founding of Gloucester County in 1651, to serve the county's southern portion along the York River, and a church was built near the current site on land donated by Col. Augustine Warner Jr., who twice served as speaker of Virginia's House of Burgesses. His daughter Mildred would marry Laurence Washington of Westmoreland County to the north, and her grandson would become George Washington. The glebe (land to support the parish priest) is about four miles from the church, just inside the boundaries of neighboring Ware Parish, as rector Thomas Hughes noted in a letter to the Bishop of London in 1724. The rector of Abingdon parish taught at the Peasley School, administered by both parishes. Thus, the glebe house, built around 1700, is older than the current parish church and is one of the earliest examples of a hipped roof in the state, as well as being one of the most well-preserved after restoration circa 1954.

Though many Gloucester County records burned in either 1820 or 1865, a contract to expand the Abingdon church was discussed in 1751, and the current one-story brick church was probably finished in 1754 or 1755. The church has a Latin cross plan with gable roof, pedimented gable ends and modillioned cornice. Col. Lewis Burwell donated a communion set made in London in 1702 to the parish, which remains in use today. The church interior features an elaborate reredos. Following the disestablishment of the Episcopal Church in Virginia in 1802, the building fell into disrepair, although Methodists worshipped at Abingdon Church 1818–1822, and an Episcopal congregation was re-formed in 1826 and repaired the church in 1841. Federal troops occupied the church and caused damage, so it was also repaired in 1868, 1897 and 1950.
