= Zanoni, Virginia =

Unincorporated community in Virginia, United States

Coordinates: 37°23′20″N 76°29′15″W

Zanoni is an unincorporated community in Gloucester County, in the U. S. state of Virginia.

White Hall was added to the National Register of Historic Places in 1984.
