= Toddsbury =

Historic house in Virginia, United States

- U.S. National Register of Historic Places
- Virginia Landmarks Register
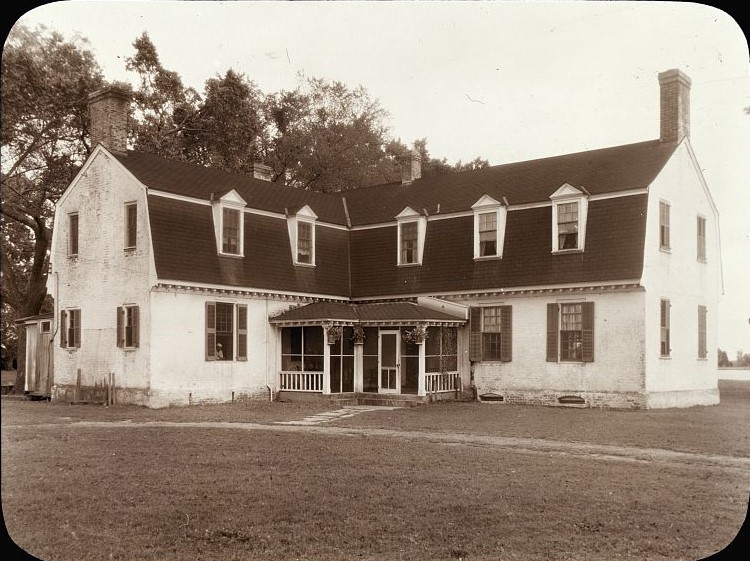
- Toddsbury, by Frances Benjamin Johnston, 1935

- Location within Virginia Location within the United States
- Location: E of jct. of Rtes. 662 and 14, near Gloucester, Virginia
- Coordinates: 37°26′5″N 76°27′5″W
- Area: 62.9 acres (25.5 ha)
- Built: 1669
- Architect: Thomas Todd
- Architectural style: Colonial
- NRHP reference No.: 69000245
- VLR No.: 036-0045

Significant dates
- Added to NRHP: November 12, 1969
- Designated VLR: September 9, 1969

Toddsbury is a historic home located on the banks of the North River near Nuttall in Gloucester County, Virginia. The house was built around 1669 by Thomas Todd and inhabited by his descendants until 1880. The builder Thomas Todd was the son of an English emigrant of the same name who patented land in Elizabeth City County in 1647 and in Gloucester County in 1664. However, he moved to Maryland and became a burgess for Baltimore County before dying at sea in 1676. The wife of one of the early settlers named Thomas Todd was Ann Gorsuch, daughter of Rev. John Gorsuch.

The house continues to be a private residence.

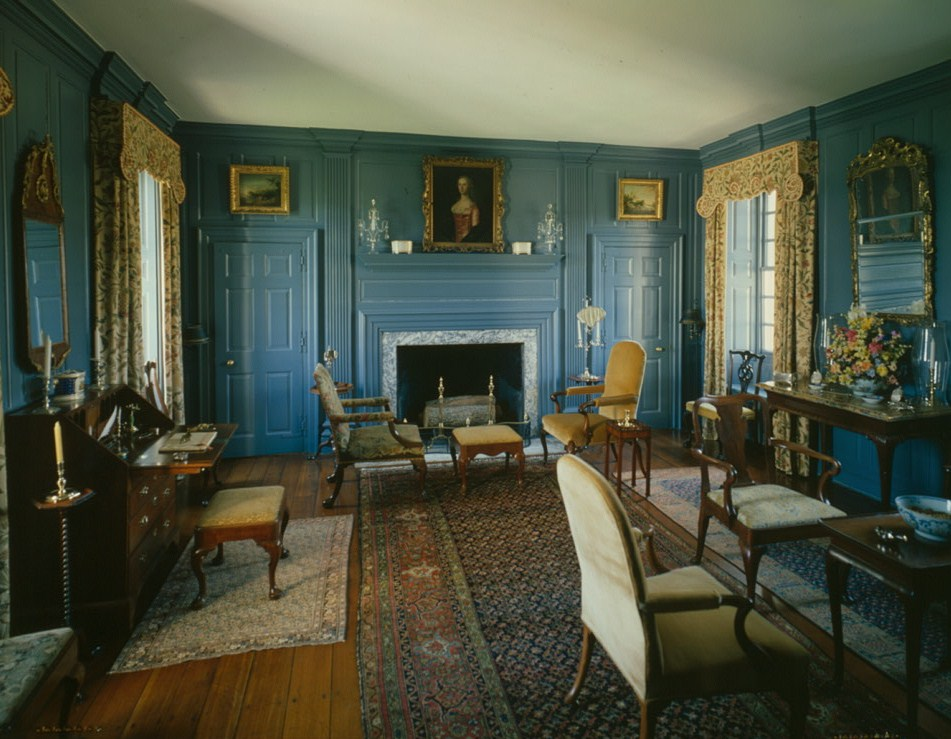
Toddsbury, HABS Photo

A 1 1/2-story building of brick laid in Flemish bond. An L-shaped house with a center stair hall, and two flanking rooms in the long arm and a subsidiary stair hall and another room in the wing. Toddsbury is a 17th-century house with 18th-century additions. The land was patented by Thomas Todd in 1657 but later went to the Tabb family. In 1880 it was purchased by the parents of William Mott, who died about 1939, The Property was later purchased in 1956 by Mrs. Charles Beatty Moore, a well-known Virginia preservationist who placed the property on the National Register of Historic Places and Virginia Landmark Properties. Her nephew, Francis Breckinridge Montague, inherited the property at Mrs. Moore's death in 1988 and continued the restoration and preservation of the fine old home, often referred to as the "Jewel of the Tidewater".

It was listed on the National Register of Historic Places in 1969.
