= Lands End (Naxera, Virginia) =

Historic house in Virginia, United States

- U.S. National Register of Historic Places
- Virginia Landmarks Register
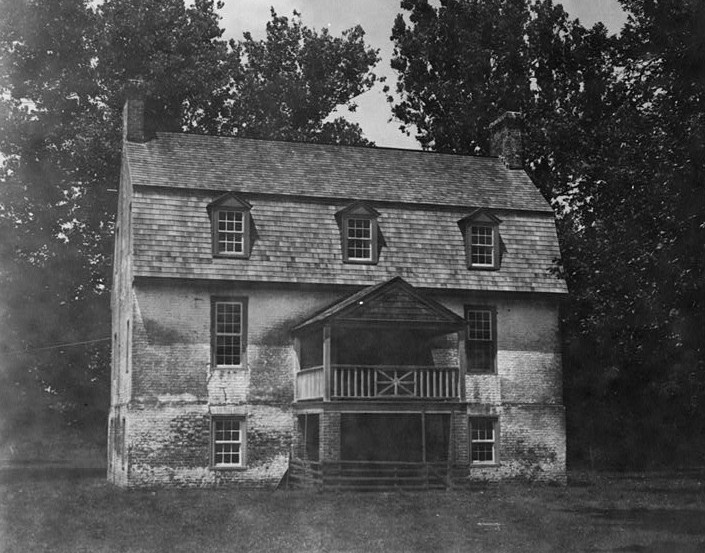
- Land's End, HABS Photo

- Location within Virginia Location within the United States
- Location: SE of Naxera on VA 614, near Naxera, Virginia
- Coordinates: 37°19′35″N 76°25′34″W
- Area: 30 acres (12 ha)
- Built: 1798
- NRHP reference No.: 74002118
- VLR No.: 036-0028

Significant dates
- Added to NRHP: November 6, 1974
- Designated VLR: September 17, 1974

Lands End is a historic home located near Naxera, Gloucester County, Virginia, United States. It was built about 1798, and is a two-story, three-bay, steeply pitched gambrel-roofed brick dwelling. It has a single pile plan and a 2½-story rear wing. It was renovated in the 1960s.

It was added to the National Register of Historic Places in 1974.
