= Roaring Springs (Gloucester, Virginia) =

Historic house in Virginia, United States

- U.S. National Register of Historic Places
- Virginia Landmarks Register
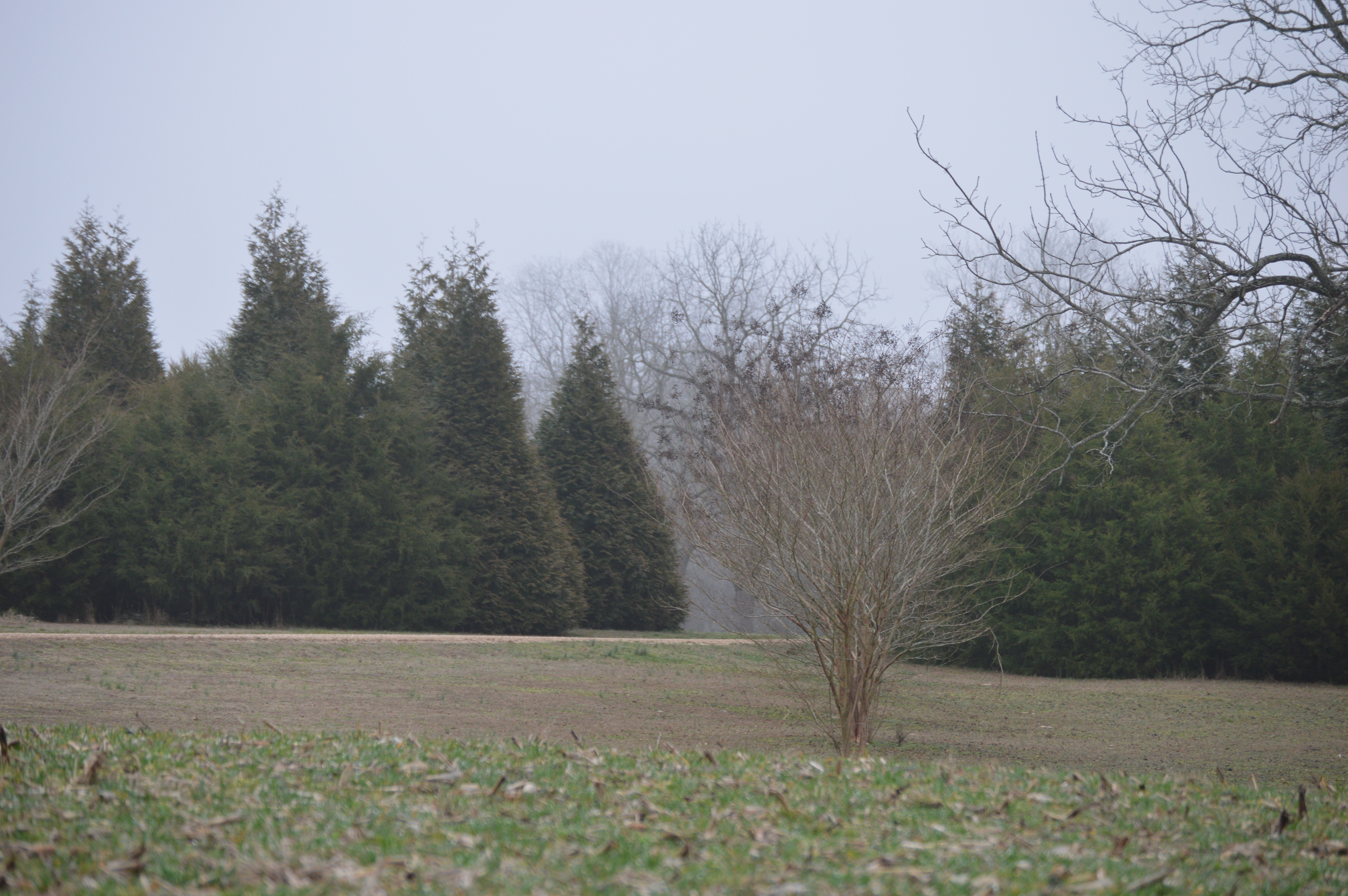
- Entrance to Roaring Springs

- Location within Virginia Location within the United States
- Location: 0.3 mi. E of VA 616, near Gloucester, Virginia
- Coordinates: 37°25′53″N 76°31′49″W
- Area: 194 acres (79 ha)
- Built: c. 1725
- Architectural style: Colonial, Greek Revival
- NRHP reference No.: 72001395
- VLR No.: 036-0040

Significant dates
- Added to NRHP: September 22, 1972
- Designated VLR: August 15, 1972

Roaring Springs is a historic home located near Gloucester, Gloucester County, Virginia. It was built about 1725, and is a 1 1/2-story, four-bay, gambrel roofed frame dwelling. The interior features Greek Revival style details.

It was added to the National Register of Historic Places in 1972.
