= Woodville School (Ordinary, Virginia) =

- U.S. National Register of Historic Places
- Virginia Landmarks Register
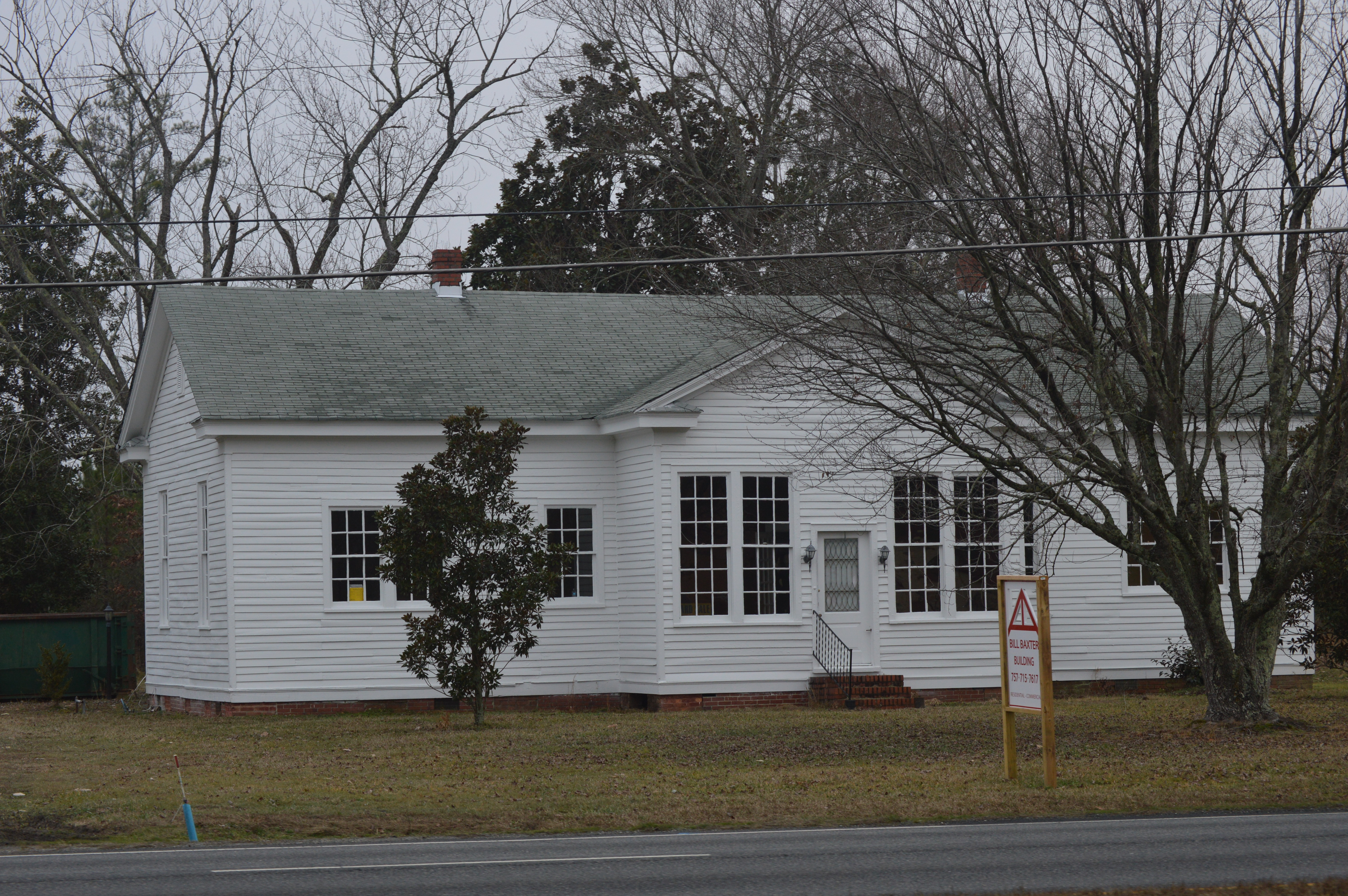
- Woodville School in 2016

- Location within Virginia Location within the United States
- Location: 4310 George Washington Memorial Highway, Ordinary, Virginia
- Coordinates: 37°19′29″N 76°30′55″W
- Area: 1 acre (0.40 ha)
- Built: 1923
- Architectural style: Late 19th And 20th Century Revivals
- NRHP reference No.: 04000042
- VLR No.: 036-5045

Significant dates
- Added to NRHP: February 11, 2004
- Designated VLR: October 3, 2003

Woodville School is a historic Rosenwald school building located at Ordinary, Gloucester County, Virginia. It was built in 1923, and is a high one-story, five-bay, symmetrical frame structure. It measures 63 feet, 6 inches, by 28 feet, 6 inches, and sheathed in white painted clapboard. It was converted to residential use after 1942. Also on the property are a contributing guesthouse or additional school building and a small shed.

It was added to the National Register of Historic Places in 2004.
