= Naxera, Virginia =

Unincorporated community in Virginia, United States

Coordinates: 37°20′27″N 76°26′50″W

Naxera is an unincorporated community in Gloucester County, in the U. S. state of Virginia.

Lands End was added to the National Register of Historic Places in 1974.
