= Ware Parish Church =

Historic church in Virginia, US

- U.S. National Register of Historic Places
- Virginia Landmarks Register
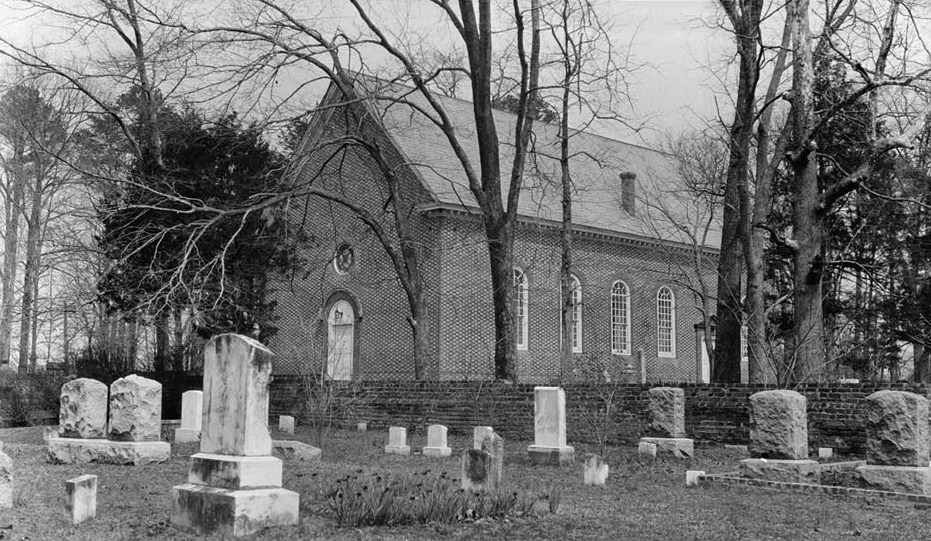
- Ware Parish Church, HABS Photo

- Location within Virginia Location within the United States
- Location: NE of Gloucester on VA 14, near Gloucester, Virginia
- Coordinates: 37°25′21″N 76°30′27″W
- Area: 10 acres (4.0 ha)
- Built: 1690
- Architectural style: Colonial
- NRHP reference No.: 73002018
- VLR No.: 036-0048

Significant dates
- Added to NRHP: March 20, 1973
- Designated VLR: October 17, 1972

Ware Parish Church is a historic Episcopal church located near Gloucester in Gloucester County, Virginia. One of the oldest surviving parish churches in the Commonwealth, Ware is the only one to retain its original three entrances. Ware Parish is one of the oldest in the state, formed in 1657, three years after Gloucester County's formation. The original building was on the opposite side of the river, the area still being known as "church field". Although a church was built on this site about 1690, the current generally accepted date for the one-story, rectangular brick structure topped by a steeply pitched gable roof is about 1715. Both structures were built during the rectorship of James Clack (1679-1723). Although the inside has been altered considerably, its exterior brickwork is well preserved, and other features include two double guillotine windows in the east end, five windows on each side, and one circular window over the western doorway.

The parish's first rector, Alexander Murray, had escaped with King Charles II from the Battle of Worcester, and was nominated to become the Bishop of Virginia, with authority over all Anglican churches in the American colonies, but died before he could be consecrated, so no Anglican bishop ever lived in the colonies. During the American Revolutionary War, American infantry camped at the church. It deteriorated during the disestablishment of the Episcopal Church in Virginia, and was occasionally used by Methodists for services before being repaired in 1827 and restored for full use as an Episcopal Church in 1854. During the American Civil War, federal troops encamped in the yard, and the church was not again repaired and restored to full use until 1878.

The parish has traditionally had a close relationship with slightly older Abingdon Church, in White Marsh also in Gloucester County, and often shared rectors. Two other colonial era chapels, at Kingston and Petsworth, did not survive, although Ware parish inherited two silver patens and two silver chalices from Petsworth and Kingston was in what became Mathews County, Virginia in 1791. It was added to the National Register of Historic Places in 1973.

== See also ==
- List of the oldest buildings in Virginia
