= Capahosic, Virginia =

Unincorporated community in Virginia, United States

Coordinates: 37°22′52″N 76°37′59″W

Capahosic is an unincorporated community in Gloucester County, in the U. S. state of Virginia.

In 1607, following John Smith's release from captivity, Chief Powhatan would give him the village of Capahosic and hold him in esteem as his son, naming him "Nantaquod".

== See also ==
- Cappahosic House
