= Ware Neck Store and Post Office =

Historic commercial building in Virginia, United States

- U.S. National Register of Historic Places
- Virginia Landmarks Register
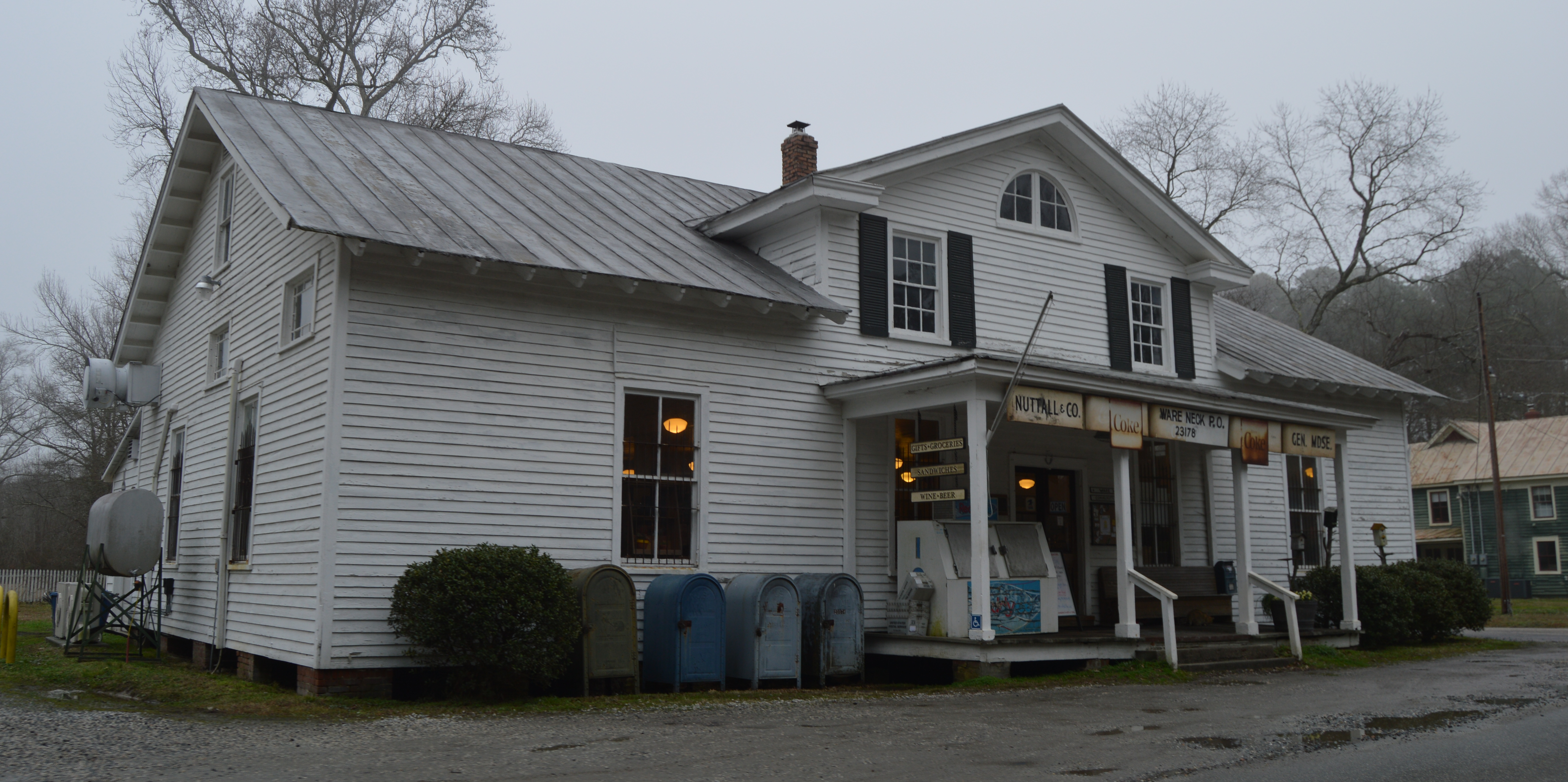
- Front and side of the post office

- Location within Virginia Location within the United States
- Location: 6495 VA 629, Ware Neck, Virginia
- Coordinates: 37°24′9″N 76°27′31″W
- Area: 3.6 acres (1.5 ha)
- Built: 1877
- NRHP reference No.: 09000393
- VLR No.: 036-5016

Significant dates
- Added to NRHP: June 3, 2009
- Designated VLR: March 18, 2009

Ware Neck Store and Post Office, also known as Nuttall's Country Store, is a United States historic commercial building located at Ware Neck, Gloucester County, Virginia. It was built in 1877 and expanded in the early 20th century. The building consists of a two-story, three-bay, frame central block flanked by 1 1/2-story wings. The central block sits under a front-gabled roof while the flanking wings have side gabled roofs.

It was added to the National Register of Historic Places in 2009.
