= Site 44GL103, Quest End =

Archaeological site in Virginia, United States

- U.S. National Register of Historic Places
- Virginia Landmarks Register
- Location within Virginia Location within the United States
- Location: 5488 & 5476 Roanes Wharf Rd., Selden, Virginia
- Coordinates: 37°21′45″N 76°28′13″W
- Area: 7 acres (2.8 ha)
- Built: 1666, c. 1900
- Built by: Collier, James William Davis; Dimmock, Marion Jr.
- NRHP reference No.: 08000387
- VLR No.: 036-5047

Significant dates
- Added to NRHP: May 9, 2008
- Designated VLR: September 17, 2009

Site 44GL103, Quest End, is a historic home and archaeological site located at Selden, Gloucester County, Virginia. The property includes a two-story, frame house and late 19th/early 20th century farm complex, with barn and smokehouse, known since the mid-20th century as Quest End. It was the site of an early colonial plantation. The property includes an early 18th-century brick foundation measuring 36 feet by 20 feet with a partially plastered cellar. The first historic occupation likely followed an initial patent in 1666 by Tobias Hansford.

It was added to the National Register of Historic Places in 2008.
