= T.C. Walker House =

Historic house in Virginia, United States

- U.S. National Register of Historic Places
- Virginia Landmarks Register
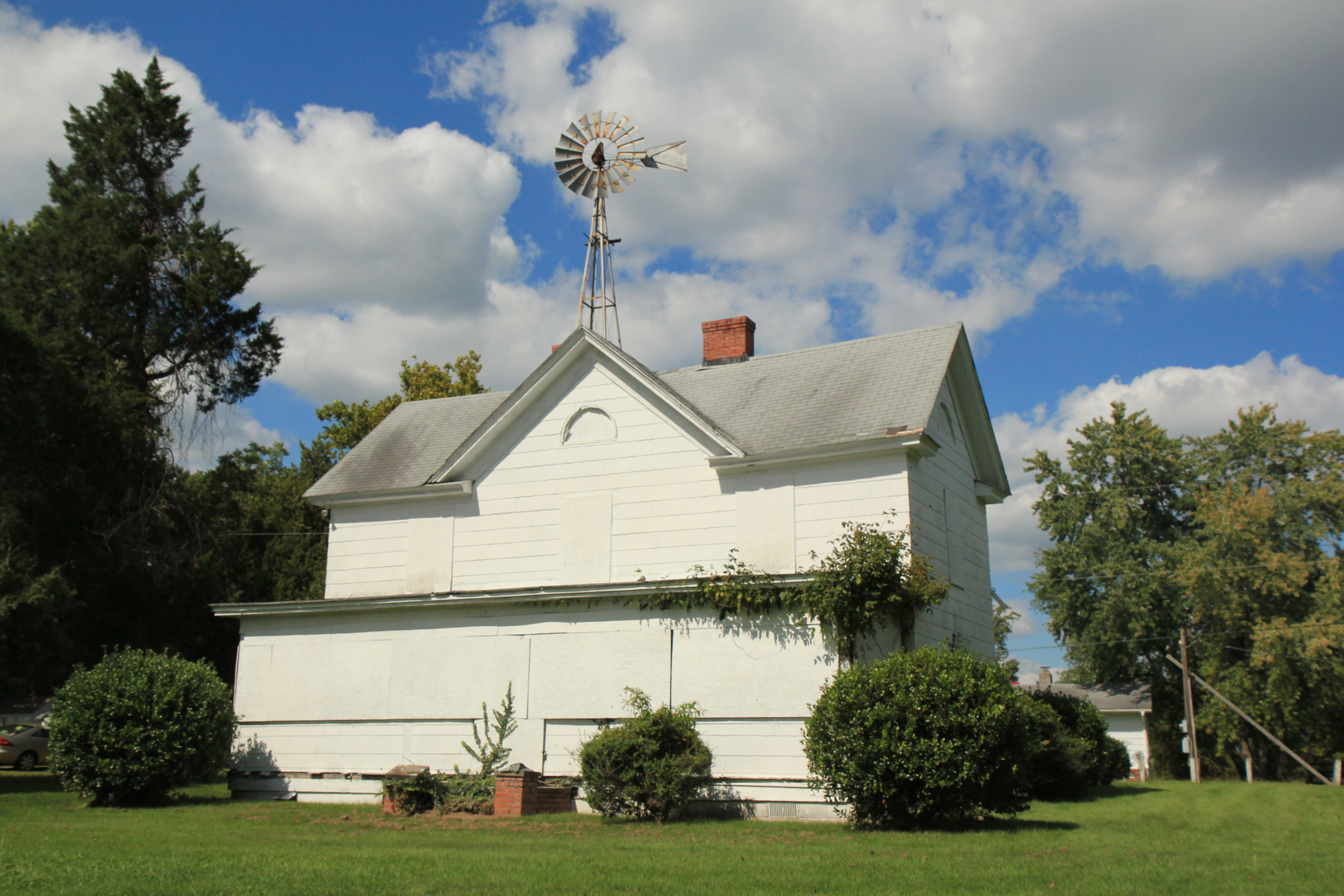
- T.C. Walker House in 2013

- Location within Virginia Location within the United States
- Location: 1 Main St., Gloucester, Virginia
- Coordinates: 37°24′47″N 76°31′19″W
- Area: 1.9 acres (0.77 ha)
- Built: c. 1880, 1900
- Architectural style: Greek Revival, Gothic Revival
- NRHP reference No.: 09001050
- VLR No.: 036-5053

Significant dates
- Added to NRHP: December 4, 2009
- Designated VLR: September 17, 2009

T.C. Walker House is the historic home of a lawyer, county supervisor, and a school superintendent who was enslaved prior to the American Civil War. It is at 1 Main Street in Gloucester, Gloucester County, Virginia and was built about 1880, and is a two-story, U-shaped, frame vernacular dwelling with traces of Greek Revival and Gothic Revival styles. It has a cross-gable roof, two-bay addition, and front porch. It was the home of Thomas Calhoun "T.C." Walker, who worked tirelessly to improve African-American land ownership and educational opportunities. As a lawyer he represented many African American clients. He purchased the home in 1900. The house was donated to Hampton University in 1977.

Walker wrote an autobiography titled The Honey-Pod Tree. He was buried at the Bethel Baptist Church Cemetery. The home was added to the National Register of Historic Places in 2009.
