= Ordinary, Virginia =

Unincorporated community in Virginia, United States

- Unincorporated community
- Location within Virginia Location within the United States
- Coordinates: 37°18′56″N 76°30′48″W
- Country: United States
- State: Virginia
- County: Gloucester
- Elevation: 39 ft (12 m)
- Time zone: UTC-5 (Eastern (EST))
  - Summer (DST): UTC-4 (EDT)
- ZIP code: 23131
- Area code: 804
- GNIS feature ID: 1493379

Ordinary is an unincorporated community in Gloucester County, Virginia, United States. Ordinary is located along U.S. Route 17, 4.5 miles (7.2 km) north of Gloucester Point. Ordinary has a post office with ZIP code 23131.

The community was named after the local ordinary (i.e. public dining hall). Woodville School was added to the National Register of Historic Places in 2004.
