= Selden, Virginia =

Unincorporated community in Virginia, United States

Coordinates: 37°21′23″N 76°28′09″W

Selden is an unincorporated community in Gloucester County, in the U. S. state of Virginia. Site 44GL103-Quest End was added to the National Register of Historic Places in 2008.
