= Hockley (Gloucester, Virginia) =

Historic house in Virginia, United States

- U.S. National Register of Historic Places
- Virginia Landmarks Register
- Location within Virginia Location within the United States
- Location: 6640 Ware Neck Rd., near Gloucester, Virginia
- Coordinates: 37°24′14″N 76°27′48″W
- Area: 41.15 acres (16.65 ha)
- Built: c. 1840, 1857, 1906
- NRHP reference No.: 10000446
- VLR No.: 036-0024

Significant dates
- Added to NRHP: July 9, 2010
- Designated VLR: March 18, 2010

Hockley, also known as Erin and Cowslip Green, is a historic estate located near Gloucester, Gloucester County, Virginia. The core of the main house was built about 1840, then added to in 1857, and modified to its present form in 1901 and 1906. It is a 2 1/2-story, five-bay, frame dwelling on a brick foundation. The front facade features two flanking two-story, 12 feet in diameter, octagonal towers, each with original copper finials at the peak. The 60 feet by 32 feet sized main structure has a 24 feet by 18 feet kitchen wing and attached garage. The property includes a contributing archaeological site, barn, two chicken sheds, garage, pump house, well, ice house. It was the home of Fannie Johnson Taliaferro, an early proponent of historic preservation and pioneering member of the Association for the Preservation of Virginia Antiquities (APVA, now Preservation Virginia).

It was added to the National Register of Historic Places in 2010.
