= Abingdon Glebe House =

Historic house in Virginia, US

- U.S. National Register of Historic Places
- Virginia Landmarks Register
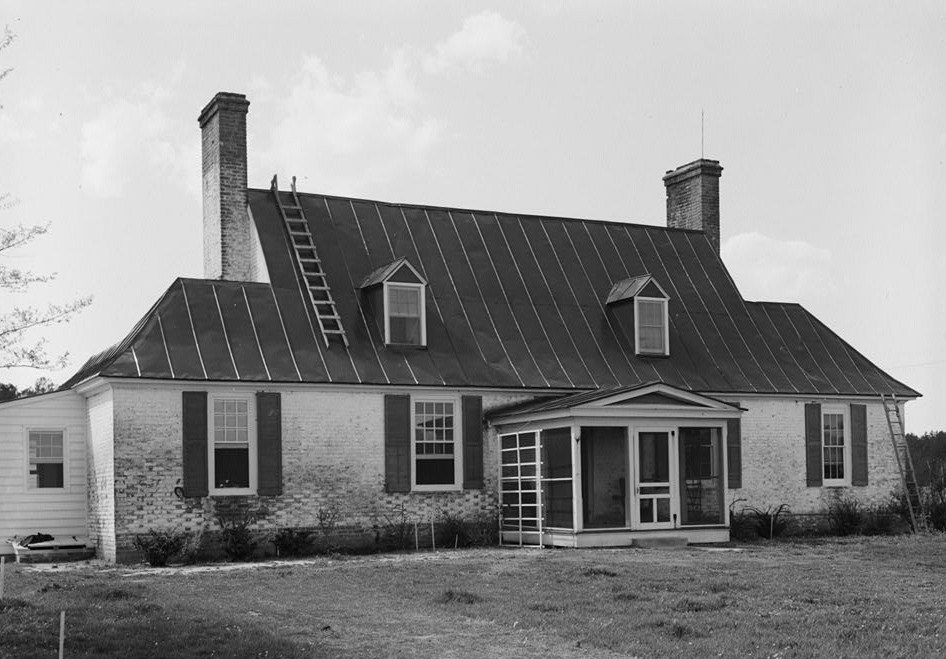
- Abingdon Glebe House, HABS Photo

- Location within Virginia Location within the United States
- Location: S of jct. of U.S. 17 and VA 615, near Gloucester, Virginia
- Coordinates: 37°22′36″N 76°32′22″W
- Area: 90 acres (36 ha)
- Built: 1700
- NRHP reference No.: 70000794
- VLR No.: 036-0002

Significant dates
- Added to NRHP: September 15, 1970
- Designated VLR: July 7, 1970

Abingdon Glebe House is a historic home located near Gloucester, Gloucester County, Virginia. It was built around 1700, and is T-shaped brick structure with one-story hipped roof end pavilions flanking the central portion of the house. The central portion and rear ell are topped by steep gable roofs. It was extensively renovated about 1954. The house and surrounding glebe lands were owned by Abingdon Parish until they were confiscated by legislative act in 1802 as part of the Disestablishment. It was acquired by William Riddick of Gloucester in the 1980s, and was bequeathed to St. James On-the-Glebe Anglican Church, a parish of the Anglican Province of America, after Riddick's death in 2006.

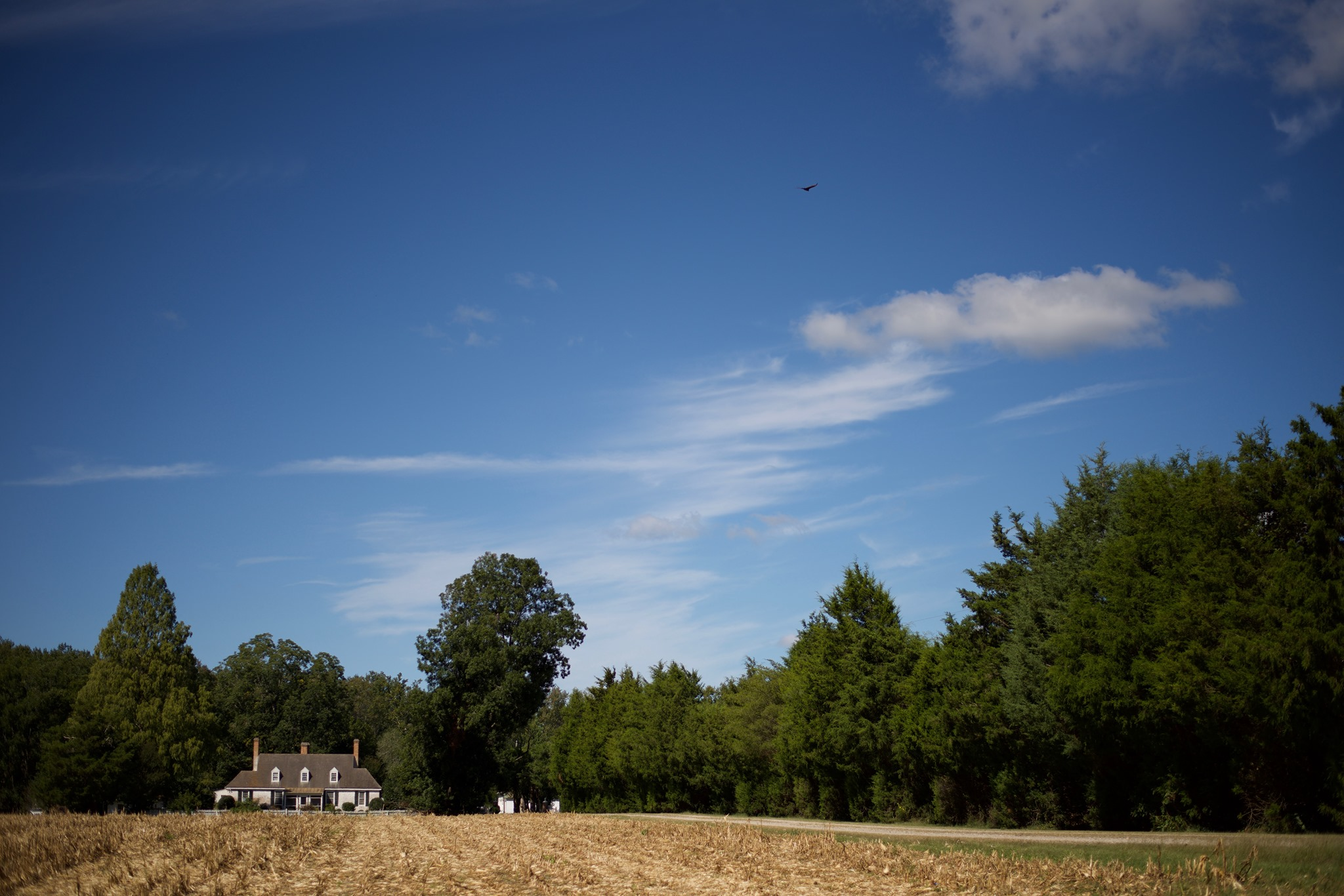
The Abingdon Glebe House, seen from the front of the Glebe.

It was added to the National Register of Historic Places in 1970.

== See also ==
- List of the oldest buildings in Virginia

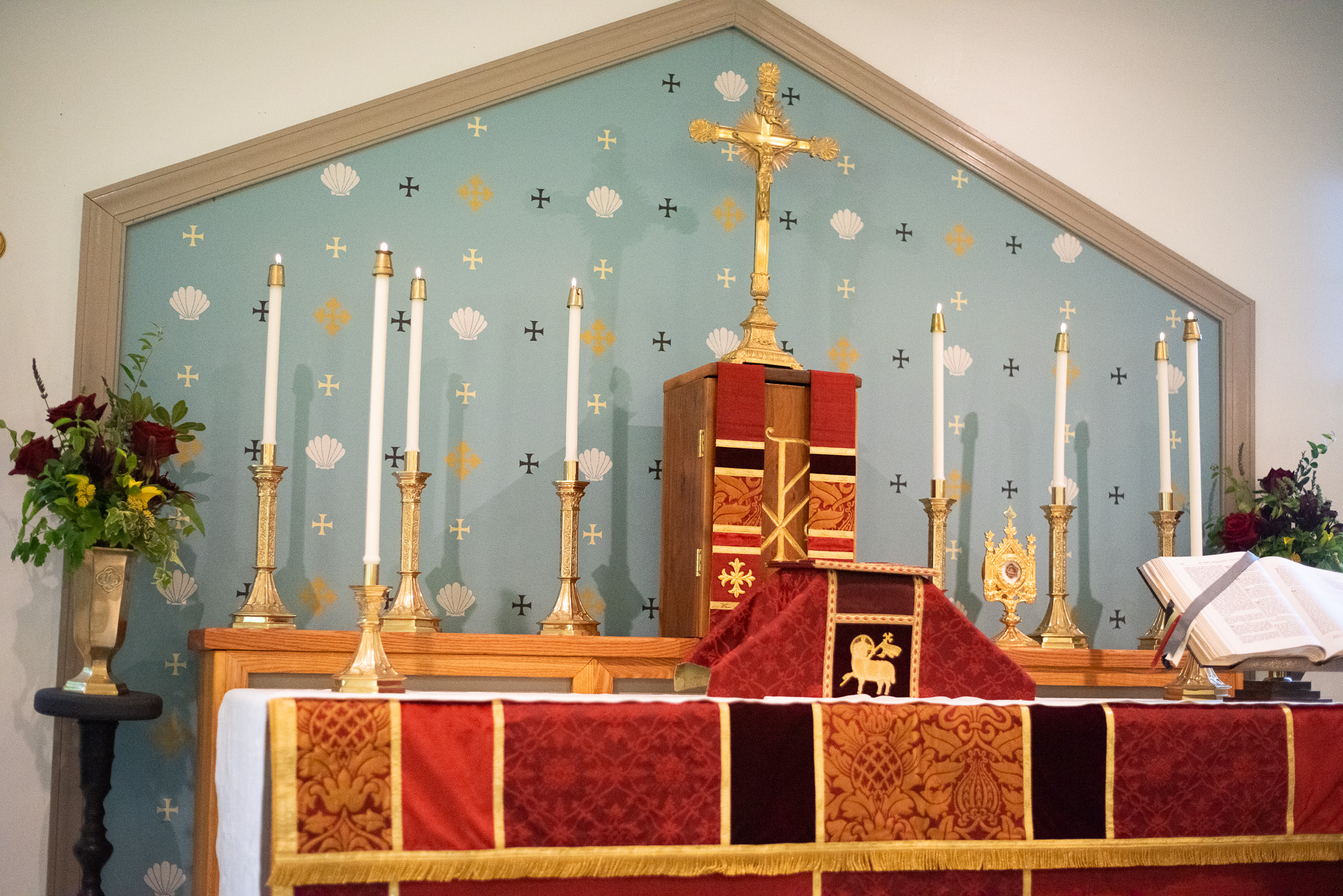
The altar of St. James On-the-Glebe Anglican Church, which is the present owner of the Abingdon Glebe House. SJOTG is a traditional Anglo-Catholic parish.
