= Gloucester Women's Club =

Historic place in Virginia, United States

- U.S. National Register of Historic Places
- Virginia Landmarks Register
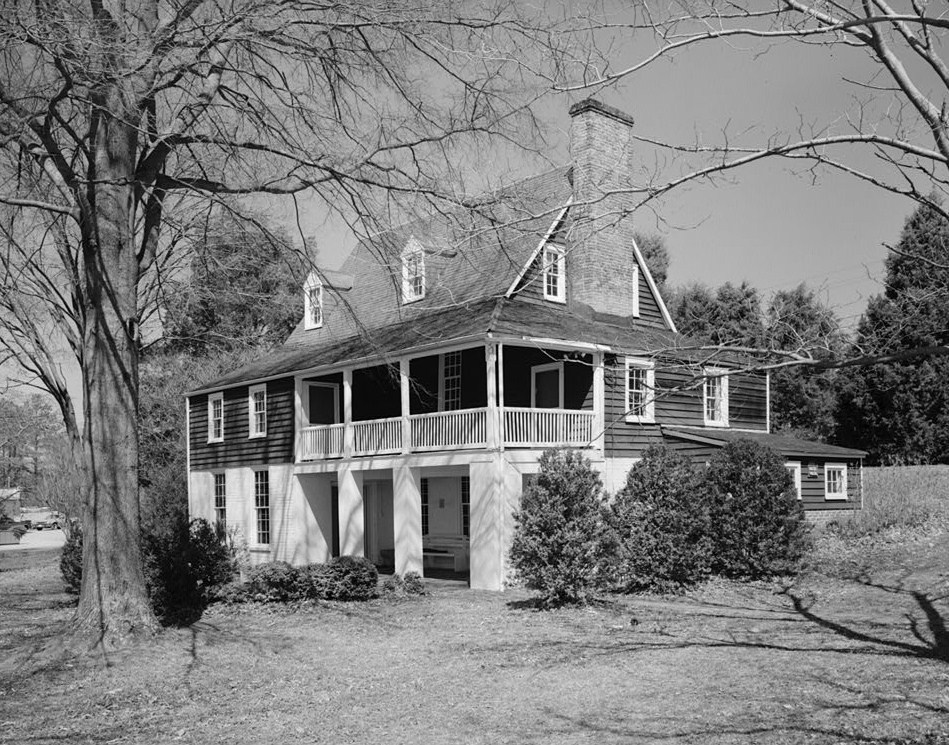
- Gloucester Women's Club, HABS Photo

- Location within Virginia Location within the United States
- Location: On U.S. 17, Gloucester Courthouse, Virginia
- Coordinates: 37°24′44″N 76°31′11″W
- Area: 1 acre (0.40 ha)
- Built: 1750
- Architectural style: Colonial
- NRHP reference No.: 74002117
- VLR No.: 036-0031

Significant dates
- Added to NRHP: January 24, 1974
- Designated VLR: November 20, 1973

Gloucester Women's Club, also known as Long Bridge Ordinary, is a historic women's club located at Gloucester Courthouse, Gloucester County, Virginia. It was built about 1750, and is a 1 1/2-story, three-bay, gable roofed frame Colonial era dwelling. A lean-to addition was built in the 19th century. The building is believed to have been originally constructed for commercial purposes. The property hosted the county fair after 1913, and in 1919 the building and surrounding acre of land were acquired by the Gloucester Women's Club.

It was added to the National Register of Historic Places in 1974.
