= Cappahosic House =

Historic house in Virginia, United States

- U.S. National Register of Historic Places
- Virginia Landmarks Register
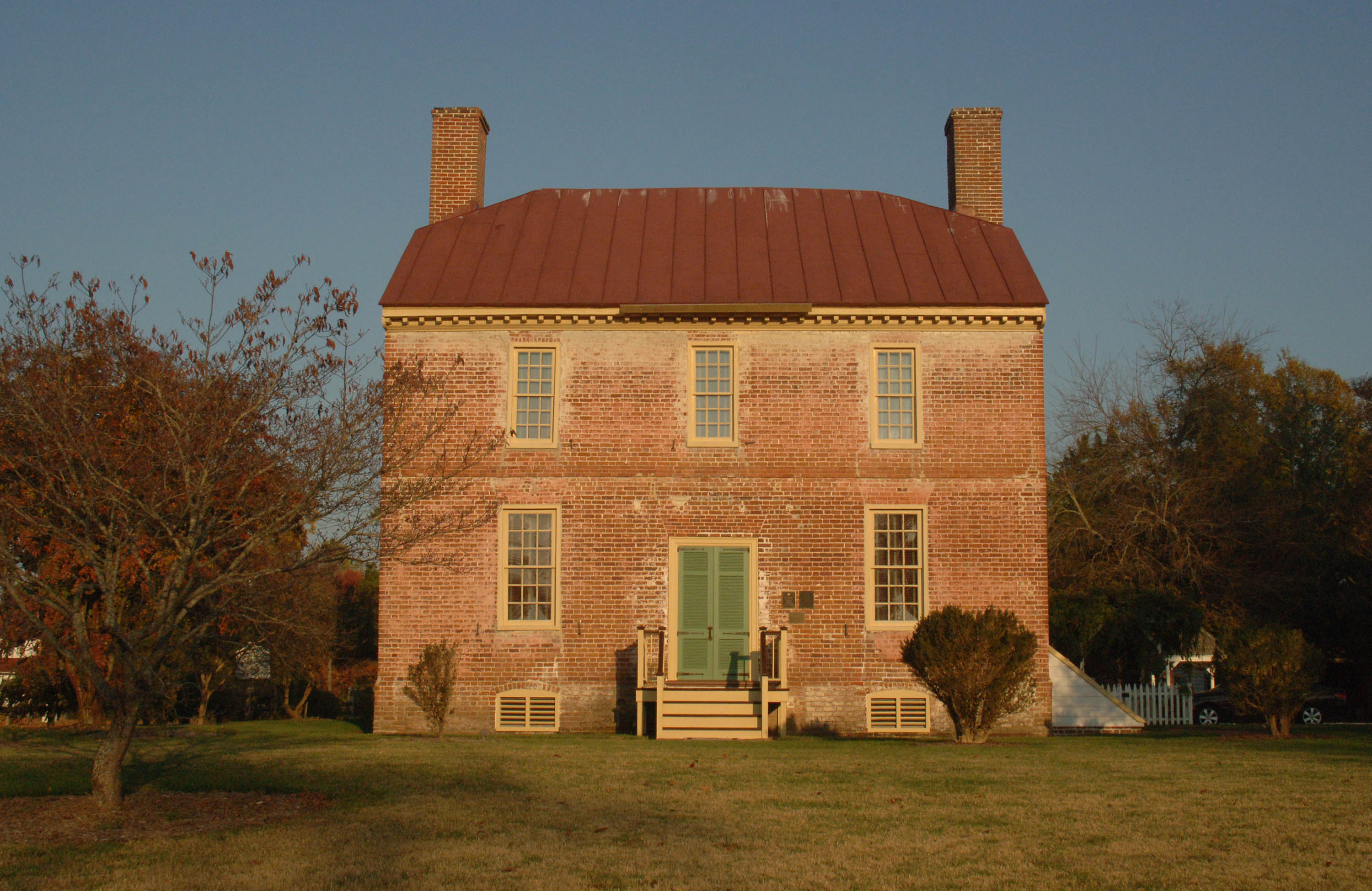
- Cappahosic House, November 2007

- Location within Virginia Location within the United States
- Location: 3198 Cappahosic Rd., Gloucester, Virginia
- Coordinates: 37°22′49″N 76°38′0″W
- Area: 4.7 acres (1.9 ha)
- Built: c. 1751
- Architectural style: Georgian
- NRHP reference No.: 03000211
- VLR No.: 036-0011

Significant dates
- Added to NRHP: April 11, 2003
- Designated VLR: April 20, 1976

Cappahosic House, also known as Baytop House and Cappahosic Ferry House, is a historic home located near Gloucester, Gloucester County, Virginia. It was built in around 1751, and is a two-story, three bay brick dwelling in the Georgian style. It has a basement and is topped by a standing seam jerkinhead red tin roof. The main block is connected in the rear to a two-story modern addition. Also on the property are contributing archaeological deposits dating principally to the 18th and 19th centuries. The house is believed to be on the site of an 18th-century ferry used to cross the York River.

It was added to the National Register of Historic Places in 2003.
