= White Marsh, Virginia =

Unincorporated community in Virginia, United States

- Unincorporated community
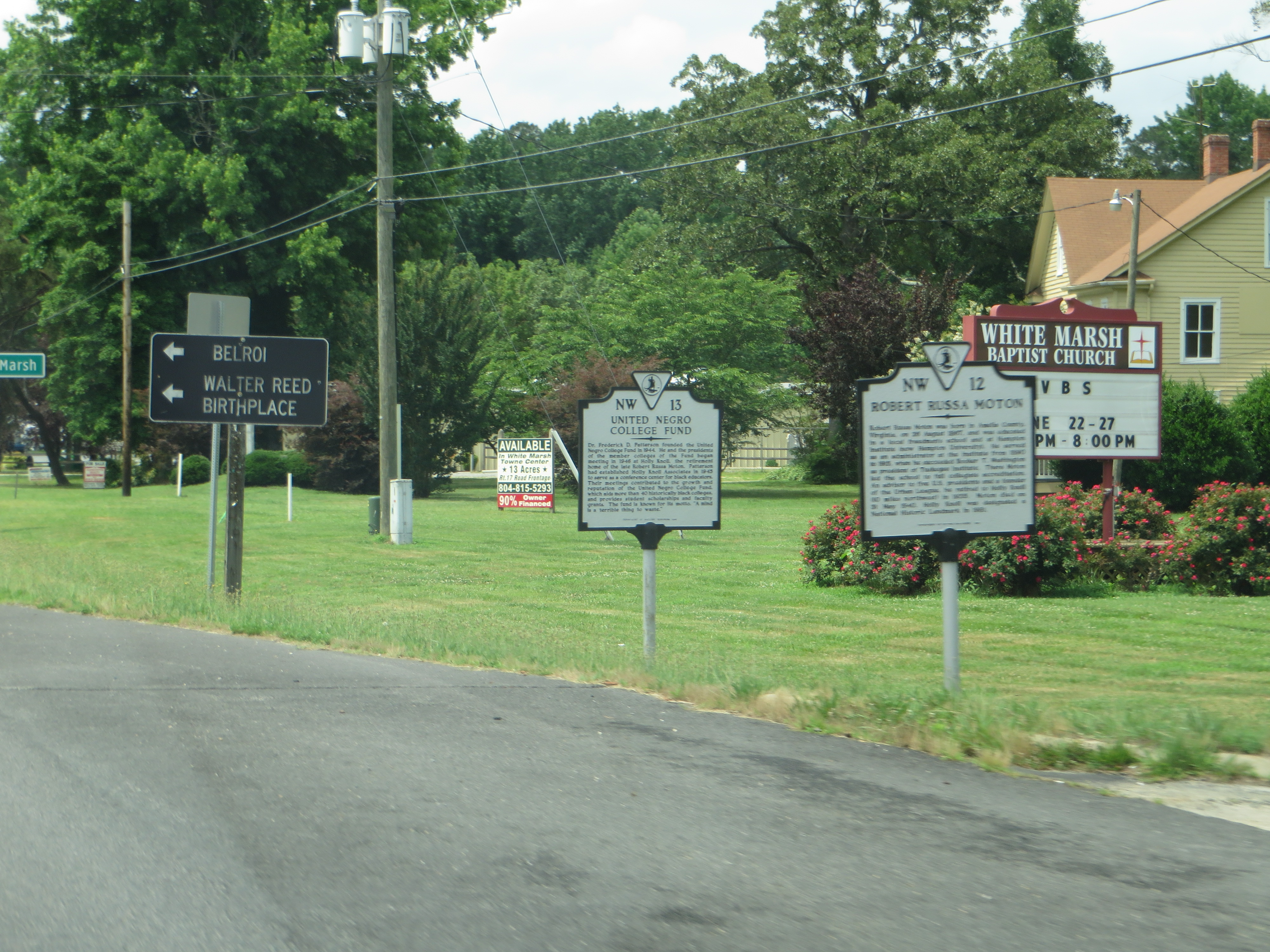

- Location within Virginia Location within the United States
- Coordinates: 37°20′33″N 76°31′17″W
- Country: United States
- State: Virginia
- County: Gloucester
- Elevation: 52 ft (16 m)
- Time zone: UTC−5 (Eastern (EST))
  - Summer (DST): UTC−4 (EDT)
- ZIP code: 23183
- Area code: 804
- GNIS feature ID: 1476590

White Marsh is an unincorporated community in Gloucester County, in the U. S. state of Virginia. White Marsh is located on U.S. Route 17, 5 miles (8.0 km) south of Gloucester Courthouse. White Marsh has a post office with ZIP code 23183.

Abingdon Church and the Fairfield Site are listed on the National Register of Historic Places.
