= Gloucester County Courthouse Square Historic District =

Historic district in Virginia, United States

- U.S. National Register of Historic Places
- U.S. Historic district
- Virginia Landmarks Register
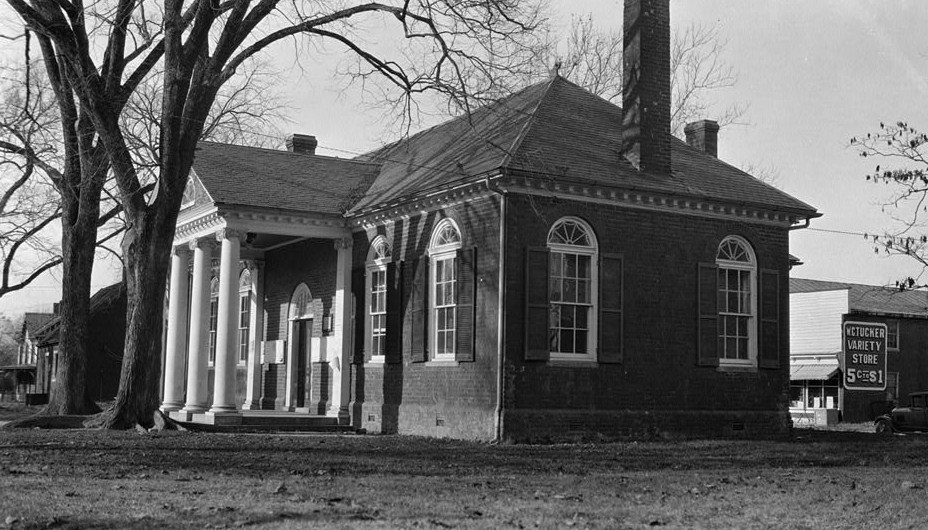
- Gloucester County Courthouse, HABS Photo

- Location within Virginia Location within the United States
- Interactive map showing the location of Gloucester County Courthouse
- Location: Main St. and Gloucester County Courthouse Sq., Gloucester Courthouse, Virginia
- Coordinates: 37°24′53″N 76°31′47″W
- Area: 5 acres (2.0 ha)
- Built: c. 1766
- Architectural style: Colonial
- NRHP reference No.: 73002016
- VLR No.: 036-0021

Significant dates
- Added to NRHP: October 3, 1973
- Designated VLR: February 20, 1973

Gloucester County Courthouse Square Historic District is a national historic district located at Gloucester Courthouse, Gloucester County, Virginia. The district encompasses 17 contributing buildings including the Gloucester County government buildings and those structures bordering the square, housing private businesses, offices and residences. The courthouse was built about 1766, and is a one-story, T-shaped brick structure with a hipped roof. Other notable buildings include the Botetourt Hotel (now the Botetourt Administration Building, c. 1770); the Botetourt Lodge; W. C. Tucker's Department Store Building; S and S Hobbies; and the Kearn's Real Estate storage house.

It was added to the National Register of Historic Places in 1974.
