= Gloucester Courthouse, Virginia =

- CDP
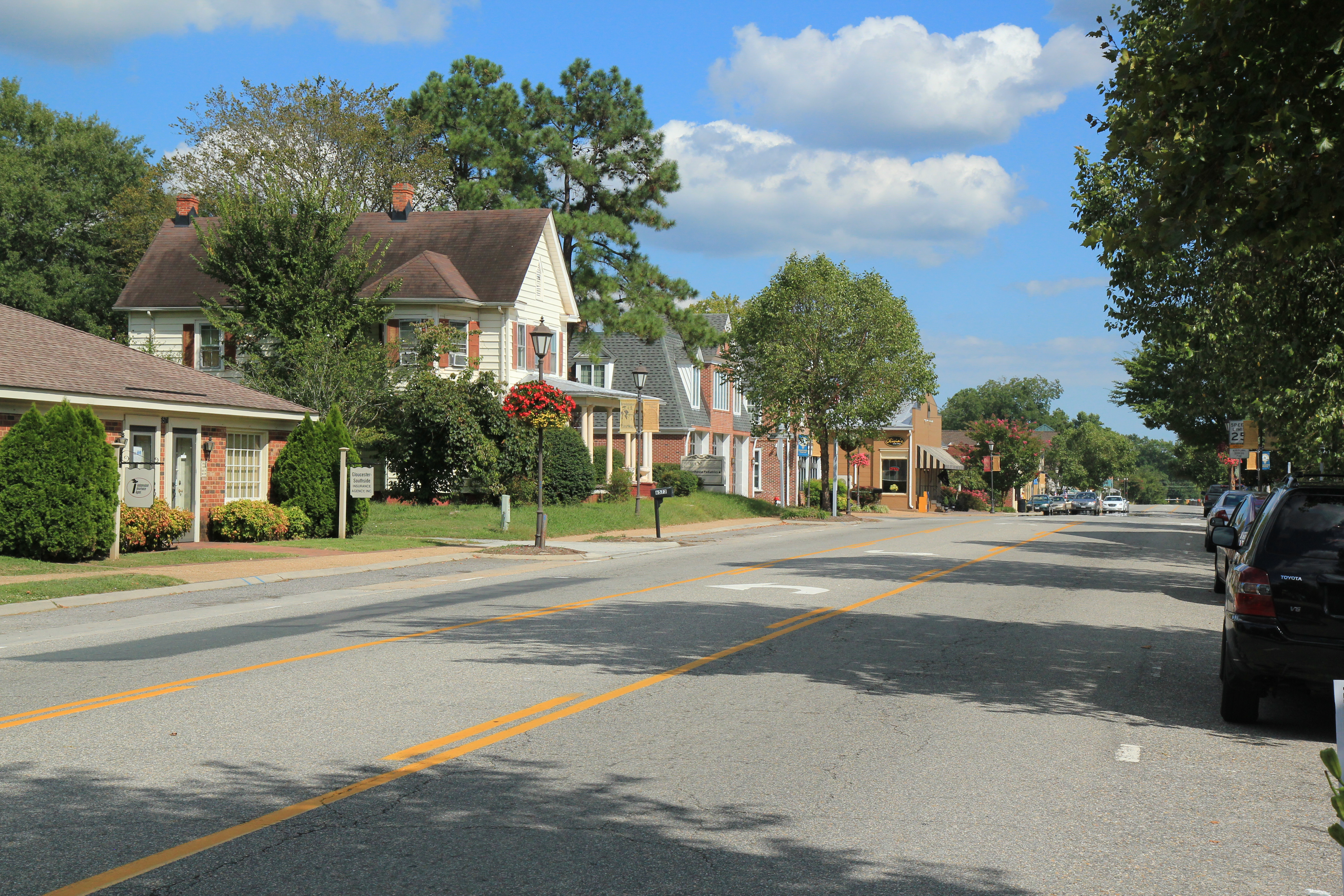
- View of Gloucester Main Street

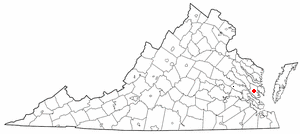
- Location of Gloucester Courthouse, Virginia
- Coordinates: 37°24′46″N 76°31′27″W
- Country: United States
- State: Virginia
- County: Gloucester

Area
  - Total: 7.2 sq mi (18.6 km^{2})
  - Land: 7.0 sq mi (18.1 km^{2})
  - Water: 0.19 sq mi (0.5 km^{2})
- Elevation: 33 ft (10 m)

Population (2010)
  - Total: 2,951
  - Density: 422/sq mi (163/km^{2})
- Time zone: UTC−5 (Eastern (EST))
  - Summer (DST): UTC−4 (EDT)
- ZIP Code: 23061
- FIPS code: 51-31608
- GNIS feature ID: 1867589
- Website: County website

Gloucester Courthouse (/ˈɡlɒstər/ GLOST-ər) is a census-designated place (CDP) in and the county seat of Gloucester County, Virginia, United States. As of the 2020 census, Gloucester Courthouse had a population of 3,030.

== History ==
The Gloucester County Courthouse Square Historic District, Gloucester Downtown Historic District, Abingdon Glebe House, Airville, Burgh Westra, Cappahosic House, Gloucester Point Archaeological District, Gloucester Women's Club, Hockley, Little England, Roaring Spring, Rosewell, Toddsbury, T.C. Walker House, Ware Parish Church, and Warner Hall are listed on the National Register of Historic Places.

== Geography ==
According to the United States Census Bureau, the CDP has a total area of 7.2 square miles (18.6 km^{2}), of which, 7.0 square miles (18.1 km^{2}) is land and 0.2 square miles (0.5 km^{2}) (2.78%) is water.

== Demographics ==
=== 2020 census ===
As of the 2020 census, Gloucester Courthouse had a population of 3,030. The median age was 47.4 years. 20.8% of residents were under the age of 18 and 25.2% of residents were 65 years of age or older. For every 100 females there were 92.9 males, and for every 100 females age 18 and over there were 88.3 males age 18 and over.

0.0% of residents lived in urban areas, while 100.0% lived in rural areas.

There were 1,112 households in Gloucester Courthouse, of which 31.1% had children under the age of 18 living in them. Of all households, 53.1% were married-couple households, 13.7% were households with a male householder and no spouse or partner present, and 27.1% were households with a female householder and no spouse or partner present. About 27.4% of all households were made up of individuals and 13.7% had someone living alone who was 65 years of age or older.

There were 1,200 housing units, of which 7.3% were vacant. The homeowner vacancy rate was 3.1% and the rental vacancy rate was 2.5%.

Racial composition as of the 2020 census
Race	Number	Percent
White	2,524	83.3%
Black or African American	260	8.6%
American Indian and Alaska Native	11	0.4%
Asian	27	0.9%
Native Hawaiian and Other Pacific Islander	0	0.0%
Some other race	22	0.7%
Two or more races	186	6.1%
Hispanic or Latino (of any race)	94	3.1%

=== 2000 census ===
As of the 2000 census, there were 2,269 people, 857 households, and 561 families residing in the CDP. The population density was 324.7 people per square mile (125.3/km^{2}). There were 907 housing units at an average density of 129.8/sq mi (50.1/km^{2}). The racial makeup of the CDP was 86.78% White, 10.67% African American, 0.48% Native American, 0.26% Asian, 0.48% from other races, 1.00% of households had 7 people., and 1.32% from two or more races. Hispanic or Latino people of any race were 1.15% of the population.

There were 857 households, out of which 28.1% had children under the age of 18 living with them, 51.3% were married couples living together, 11.0% had a female householder with no husband present, and 34.5% were non-families. 30.6% of all households were made up of individuals, and 15.5% had someone living alone who was 65 years of age or older. The average household size was 2.28 and the average family size was 2.82.

In the CDP, the population was spread out, with 20.0% under the age of 18, 5.5% from 18 to 24, 23.7% from 25 to 44, 23.8% from 45 to 64, and 27.1% who were 65 years of age or older. The median age was 46 years. For every 100 females, there were 75.2 males. For every 100 females age 18 and over, there were 71.3 males.

The median income for a household in the CDP was $40,292, and the median income for a family was $56,406. Males had a median income of $43,971 versus $26,477 for females. The per capita income for the CDP was $20,749. About 4.3% of families and 6.2% of the population were below the poverty line, including 6.2% of those under age 18 and 1.9% of those age 65 or over.
