= Virginia State Route 14 =

State highway in eastern Virginia, US

State Route 14

Route information
- Maintained by VDOT
- Length: 71.10 mi (114.42 km)
- Existed: July 1, 1933–present
- Tourist routes: Virginia Byway

Major junctions
- West end: US 360 / SR 721 in St. Stephens Church
- SR 33 in Shacklefords; US 17 in Gloucester Courthouse; SR 3 in Fort Nonsense; SR 198 in Mathews
- East end: Cul-de-sac in Bayside

Location
- Country: United States
- State: Virginia
- Counties: King and Queen, Gloucester, Mathews

Highway system
- Virginia Routes; Interstate; US; Primary; Secondary; Byways; History; HOT lanes
← SR 13	→ US 15

State Route 14 (SR 14) is a primary state highway in the U.S. state of Virginia. The state highway runs 71.10 miles (114.42 km) from U.S. Route 360 (US 360) in St. Stephens Church east to a cul-de-sac in Bayside. SR 14 is the primary highway of King and Queen and Mathews counties and the main east–west highway of Gloucester County; the highway connects the namesake county seats of all three counties.

== Route description ==
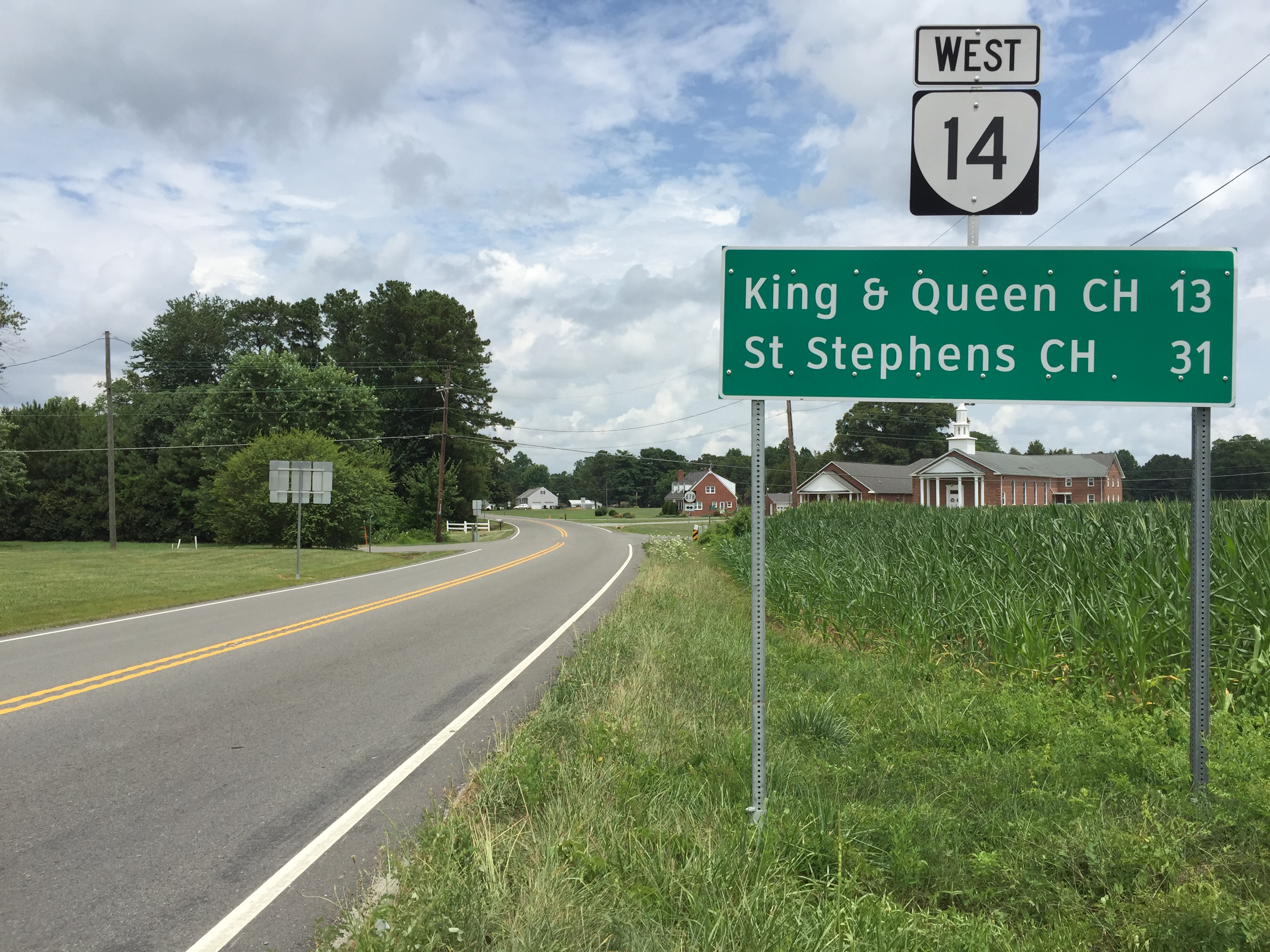
View west along SR 14 at SR 33 in Shacklefords

SR 14 begins at an intersection with US 360 (Richmond–Tappahannock Highway) in St. Stephens Church. The roadway continues on the north side of the intersection as SR 721 (Newtown Road), the old route of SR 14 that continues northwest to near Bowling Green. SR 14 heads southeast as The Trail, a winding highway with multiple right-angle turns that serves as the primary north–south highway of King and Queen County. The state highway passes through the hamlets of Bruington, Henleys Fork, Stevensville, Cumnor on its way to the county seat of King and Queen Court House, which contains the county offices and the county's only high school. SR 14 continues southeast through the small communities of Truhart, Little Plymouth, Shanghai, and Elsom to its junction with SR 33 (Lewis Puller Memorial Highway) in Shacklefords.

SR 14 and SR 33 run concurrently along the four-lane divided highway named for the decorated U.S. Marine Chesty Puller east to Shacklefords Fork, where SR 14 heads southeast along Buena Vista Road. After passing through Cologne and Plain View, the state highway veers east and crosses the Poropotank River into Gloucester County. SR 14 continues east a short distance as Adner Road to Adner, where the state highway turns southeast onto US 17 (George Washington Memorial Highway). SR 14 and US 17 follow the four-lane divided highway southeast to Gloucester Courthouse, where US 17 bypasses the county seat on its way to Yorktown. SR 14 and US 17 Business head east on Main Street, along which the highways pass through a roundabout surrounding the county courthouse.

At the east end of Gloucester Courthouse, SR 14 turns north onto John Clayton Memorial Highway, a four-lane divided highway. The intersection where SR 14 diverges from US 17 Business is also the eastern terminus of SR 3. SR 14 and SR 3 head north then curve east to cross Burke Mill Stream into Mathews County. Just east of the stream at Fort Nonsense, SR 3 turns north onto Windsor Road to head for Middlesex County and the Northern Neck. SR 14 reduces to two lanes and heads through Foster before reaching a junction with SR 198 (Buckley Hall Road) just south of Hudgins. The state highways run concurrently south to the village of Mathews, where SR 198 veers east as Buckley Hall Road toward Moon. SR 14 turns south to pass through the county seat as Main Street, then becomes John Clayton Memorial Highway again as it continues in the direction of New Point Comfort, the point of land on the north side of the entrance of the York River to the Chesapeake Bay. In the hamlet of Bavon, SR 600 (Point Road) continues east toward New Point Comfort Natural Area Preserve while SR 14 turns south toward Bayside. The state highway turns west, then north, to a cul-de-sac at Bayside Wharf on Davis Creek.

== Major intersections ==
County	Location	mi	km	Destinations	Notes
King and Queen	St. Stephens Church	0.00	0.00	US 360 (Richmond Tappahannock Highway) / SR 721 north (Newtown Road) – Bowling Green, Richmond, Tappahannock	Western terminus
King and Queen	Shacklefords	30.13	48.49	SR 33 west (General Puller Highway) – West Point, Richmond, Middle Peninsula Regional Airport	Western end of SR 33 concurrency
King and Queen	Shacklefords Fork	31.79	51.16	SR 33 east (General Puller Highway) – Saluda, Deltaville, Rappahannock Community College Glenns Campus	Eastern end of SR 33 concurrency
Gloucester	Adner	37.76	60.77	US 17 north (George Washington Memorial Highway) – Tappahannock, Fredericksburg	Western end of US 17 concurrency
Gloucester	Ark			SR 606 (Ark Road) – Allmonds Wharf, Sassafras	former SR 217 south
Gloucester	Gloucester Courthouse	45.61	73.40	US 17 south (George Washington Memorial Highway) / SR 619 (Fiddlers Green Road) – Yorktown, Newport News	Eastern end of US 17 concurrency; western end of US 17 Bus. concurrency
Gloucester	Gloucester Courthouse	46.88	75.45	US 17 Bus. south (Main Street) – Yorktown, York River Bridge	Eastern end of US 17 Bus. concurrency; western end of SR 3 concurrency
Mathews	Fort Nonsense	53.24	85.68	SR 3 west (Windsor Road) – White Stone, Saluda, Kilmarnock	Eastern end of SR 3 concurrency
Mathews	Foster			SR 660 – Cardinal, Mobjack	former SR 224 south
Mathews		60.52	97.40	SR 198 west (Buckley Hall Road) – Blakes, Cobbs Creek, Saluda	Western end of SR 198 concurrency
Mathews	Mathews	62.21	100.12	SR 198 east (Buckley Hall Road) – Diggs, Haven Beach	Eastern end of SR 198 concurrency
Mathews	Bayside	71.10	114.42	road ends	Eastern terminus
1.000 mi = 1.609 km; 1.000 km = 0.621 mi: Concurrency terminus

< SR 28	Two‑digit State Routes; 1923-1933	SR 30 >
none	District 6 State Routes; 1928–1933	SR 601 >
