= U.S. Route 17 in Virginia =

Section of U.S. highway in Virginia

U.S. Route 17
- Coastal Highway
- US 17 highlighted in red

Route information
- Maintained by VDOT
- Length: 255.83 mi (411.72 km)
- Existed: 1926–present
- Tourist routes: Virginia Byway

Major junctions
- South end: US 17 in Chesapeake
- I-64 / I-464 / SR 168 in Chesapeake; I-264 / US 58 in Portsmouth; I-664 / SR 164 in Suffolk; I-64 / US 60 / US 258 in Newport News; US 360 in Tappahannock; US 301 in Port Royal; I-95 / US 1 near Fredericksburg; US 15 / US 29 in Warrenton; I-66 in Marshall; I-81 / US 522 near Winchester
- North end: US 11 / US 50 / US 522 in Winchester

Location
- Country: United States
- State: Virginia
- Counties: City of Chesapeake, City of Portsmouth, City of Suffolk, Isle of Wight, City of Newport News, York, Gloucester, Middlesex, Essex, Caroline, Spotsylvania, City of Fredericksburg, Stafford, Fauquier, Clarke, Frederick, City of Winchester

Highway system
- United States Numbered Highway System; List; Special; Divided; Virginia Routes; Interstate; US; Primary; Secondary; Byways; History; HOT lanes
← SR 16	→ SR 18

U.S. Route 17 (US 17) is a part of the United States Numbered Highway System that runs from Punta Gorda, Florida, to Winchester, Virginia. In Virginia, the U.S. Highway runs 255.83 miles (411.72 km) from the North Carolina state line in Chesapeake north to its northern terminus at US 11, US 50, and US 522 in Winchester. US 17 is a major highway in the eastern half of Virginia. The U.S. Highway connects the Albemarle Region of North Carolina with the Hampton Roads metropolitan area. Within the urban area, US 17 passes through the South Hampton Roads cities of Chesapeake, Portsmouth, and Suffolk and the Virginia Peninsula city of Newport News. Between Yorktown and Fredericksburg, the U.S. Highway serves as the primary highway of the Middle Peninsula. At Fredericksburg, US 17 leaves the Atlantic Plain; the highway passes through the Piedmont town of Warrenton and crosses the Blue Ridge Mountains on its way to Winchester in the Shenandoah Valley. The route from Tappahannock to Winchester roughly follows the Confederate march during the Civil War to Gettysburg.

== Route description ==
=== Chesapeake to Portsmouth ===
US 17 enters Virginia at the North Carolina state line adjacent to the Dismal Swamp Canal in a rural area east of Great Dismal Swamp National Wildlife Refuge and northwest of Elizabeth City. The U.S. Highway heads north through the city of Chesapeake as George Washington Highway, a four-lane divided highway that veers away from the canal and passes by Chesapeake Regional Airport. North of the highway's split with US 17 Business (US 17 Bus.), which follows George Washington Highway through the Chesapeake community of Deep Creek, US 17 curves northeast as Dominion Boulevard. The highway interchanges with State Route 165 (SR 165; Cedar Road, Moses Grandy Trail), then crosses the Southern Branch Elizabeth River on the newly constructed and tolled Dominion Boulevard Veterans Bridge, replacing the former double-leaf bascule drawbridge known commonly as the Dominion Boulevard Steel Bridge. US 17 meets the southern end of SR 166 (Bainbridge Boulevard) just north of the bridge.

US 17 has an interchange with SR 190 (Great Bridge Boulevard). Just east of that intersection, US 17 enters a combination cloverleaf-directional interchange with SR 168, which heads south as the Oak Grove Connector toward the Outer Banks; Interstate 64 (I-64), which follows the southern segment of the Hampton Roads Beltway, and I-464, which heads north toward downtown Norfolk. US 17 becomes concurrent with I-64 in the direction of Suffolk (technically eastbound, but heading west). The four-lane freeway crosses the Southern Branch on the High Rise Bridge. I-64 and US 17 diverge at a cloverleaf interchange with George Washington Highway, which heads south as US 17 Bus. I-64 continues west toward its junction with I-664 at Bower's Hill while US 17 heads north on the four-lane divided highway.

US 17 crosses over Norfolk Southern Railway's Norfolk District and intersects Military Highway, which carries US 13 and US 460. The U.S. Highway continues as a three-lane road with a center left-turn lane to the north end of SR 196 (Canal Drive), where the highway becomes five lanes and crosses St. Julian Creek. US 17 enters the city of Portsmouth at its at-grade crossing of another Norfolk Southern Railway line. The highway becomes a four-lane divided highway at SR 239 (Victory Boulevard). At Paradise Creek, SR 141 continues along George Washington Highway while US 17 turns northwest onto Frederick Boulevard. The highway parallels a rail line through its intersection with SR 337 (Portsmouth Boulevard), then veers away from the railroad to meet I-264 at a partial cloverleaf interchange with a flyover ramp from southbound US 17 to the eastbound Interstate.

=== Portsmouth to Yorktown ===
US 17 has another at-grade railroad crossing before the highway intersects SR 337 Alternate (Turnpike Road). Just north of its oblique intersection with US 58, US 17 turns west onto High Street. The four-lane undivided highway crosses the Western Branch Elizabeth River on the Churchland Bridge. US 17 becomes a divided highway again in the community of Churchland, where the highway intersects another rail line between its intersections with Churchland Boulevard. The U.S. Highway briefly passes through Chesapeake again, where the highway is named Western Branch Boulevard, before the highway enters the city of Suffolk and becomes Bridge Road. US 17 meets the southern end of SR 135 (College Drive) and crosses another rail line. The highway has a partial interchange with I-664 (Hampton Roads Beltway) just south of the Interstate's interchange with SR 164 (Western Freeway). Access to SR 164 is provided by a partial interchange to the west of I-664. Access from westbound SR 164 to southbound US 17 is provided via SR 135.

US 17 crosses Bennett Creek and curves north. The highway reduces to two lanes to cross the Nansemond River on the Nansemond River Bridge, which is also named for Mills Godwin. US 17 passes through the community of Crittenden before using the two-lane Crittenden Bridge to cross Chuckatuck Creek into Isle of Wight County. The highway continues northwest as Carrollton Boulevard, name for the Carrollton community within which US 17 intersects US 258 and SR 32 (Brewers Neck Boulevard). The three highways curve northeast and cross the James River on the four-lane James River Bridge. At the Newport News end of the bridge, US 17, US 258, and SR 32 continue as six-lane Mercury Boulevard, which has a partial cloverleaf interchange with US 60 (Warwick Boulevard), crosses over CSX Transportation's Peninsula Subdivision, and has an intersection with SR 143 (Jefferson Avenue), where SR 32 ends and US 258 continues along Mercury Boulevard through Hampton.

US 17 turns north to join SR 143 on six-lane Jefferson Avenue. The two highways intersect SR 152 (Main Street) and SR 306 (Harpersville Road), which continues east as Hampton Roads Center Parkway. US 17 and SR 143 diverge at J. Clyde Morris Boulevard, which heads west as SR 312. The U.S. Highway heads northeast along the six-lane boulevard through a cloverleaf interchange with I-64. US 17 reduces to four lanes as it crosses Brick Kiln Creek into York County, where the highway becomes George Washington Memorial Highway. Within Tabb, the U.S. Highway intersects SR 171 (Victory Boulevard) and meets the northern end of SR 134 (Hampton Highway) at a trumpet interchange. US 17 crosses the Poquoson River just east of its impoundment, Hardwoods Mill Reservoir, then passes through Grafton, where the highway intersects SR 173 (Denbigh Boulevard) and SR 105 (Fort Eustis Boulevard). North of Harris Grove, the U.S. Highway enters Colonial National Historical Park. Within the federal property to the west of Yorktown, US 17 intersects SR 238 and has an interchange with Colonial Parkway. The U.S. Highway crosses the York River on the George P. Coleman Memorial Bridge, a double swing bridge that solicits a toll from motorists heading northbound into Gloucester County.

=== Yorktown to Fredericksburg ===
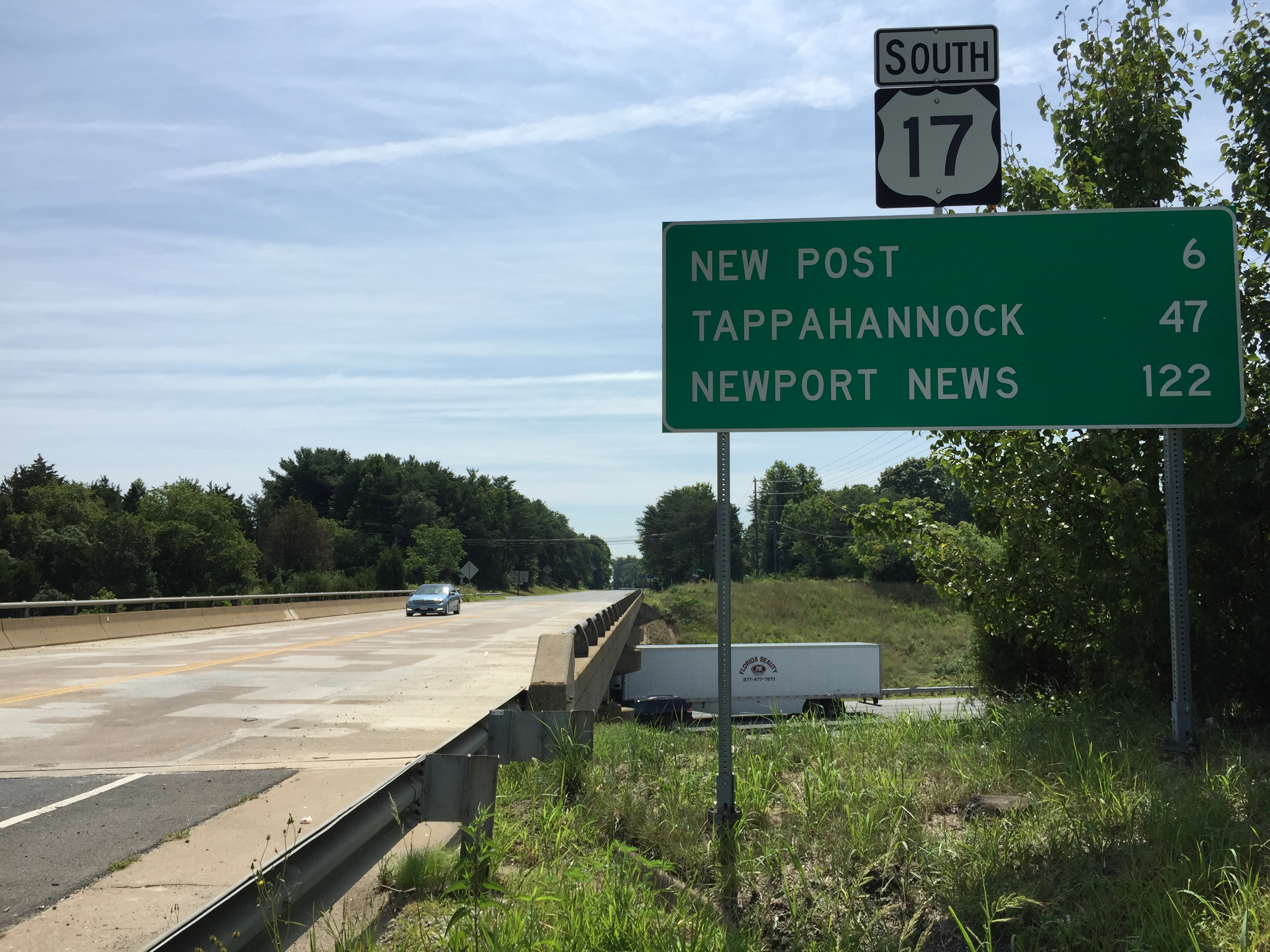
View south along US 17 on the bridge over I-95 in Fourmile Fork, Spotsylvania County

US 17 continues north through Gloucester Point, which is home to the Virginia Institute of Marine Science. At the north end of the suburban community, the U.S. Highway meets the western end of SR 216 (Guinea Road). US 17 continues through a suburban area to Gloucester Courthouse, which is directly served by US 17 Bus. (Main Street). At US 17's northern intersection with the business route, the U.S. Highway becomes concurrent with SR 14 north to Adner, where the state highway heads west as Adner Road. At Glenns, the highway has an intersection with SR 198 (Glenns Road) and SR 33 (Lewis Puller Memorial Highway). US 17 and SR 33 head north together and cross the Dragon Swamp, which becomes the Piankatank River, into Middlesex County and assume the name Tidewater Trail. The two highways diverge at Saluda, into which SR 33 and US 17 Bus. head north as Gloucester Road. US 17 collects the other end of the business route (School Street) on the west side of Saluda. US 17 enters Essex County at the community of Laneview. The U.S. Highway passes through Center Cross and Dunnsville and crosses Piscataway Creek before reaching Brays Fork, where the highway has a directional intersection with US 360 (Richmond Highway). The two highways enter the town of Tappahannock and pass through a commercial strip as Tappahannock Boulevard. US 17 and US 360 cross Hoskins Creek and pass through the downtown area as four-lane undivided Tidewater Trail. At the north end of downtown, US 360 turns east onto Queen Street to cross the Rappahannock River to the Northern Neck. US 17 expands to a divided highway and follows the west bank of the river before heading inland again after crossing Mount Landing Creek. The U.S. Highway passes through the communities of Caret, Champlain, Chance, and Loretto before crossing Portobogo Creek into Caroline County. US 17 passes through Etta ahead of its junction with US 301 (A.P. Hill Boulevard) at the town of Port Royal.

US 17 continues northwest as a two-lane road that follows the eastern boundary of Fort A.P. Hill. The U.S. Highway passes through Rappahannock Academy, named for a defunct military school, Moss Neck, and Olney Corner before curving west. US 17 becomes Mills Drive on entering Spotsylvania County. At New Post, the highway intersects SR 2, which heads south as Sandy Lane Drive toward Bowling Green and north concurrent with US 17 Bus. as Tidewater Trail toward Fredericksburg. US 17 crosses over CSX Transportation's RF&P Subdivision as it heads west to its junction with US 1 (Jefferson Davis Highway) at Massaponax. The two U.S. Highways run together through a commercial area north to a partial cloverleaf interchange with I-95. US 17 follows the six-lane Interstate north through a cloverleaf interchange with SR 3 (Plank Road) within the city of Fredericksburg and over the Rappahannock River on the Rappahannock Falls Bridge. North of the river in Stafford County, US 17 separates from I-95 for the last time on its entire route and receives the northern end of US 17 Bus. at a cloverleaf interchange in Falmouth.

=== Fredericksburg to Winchester ===
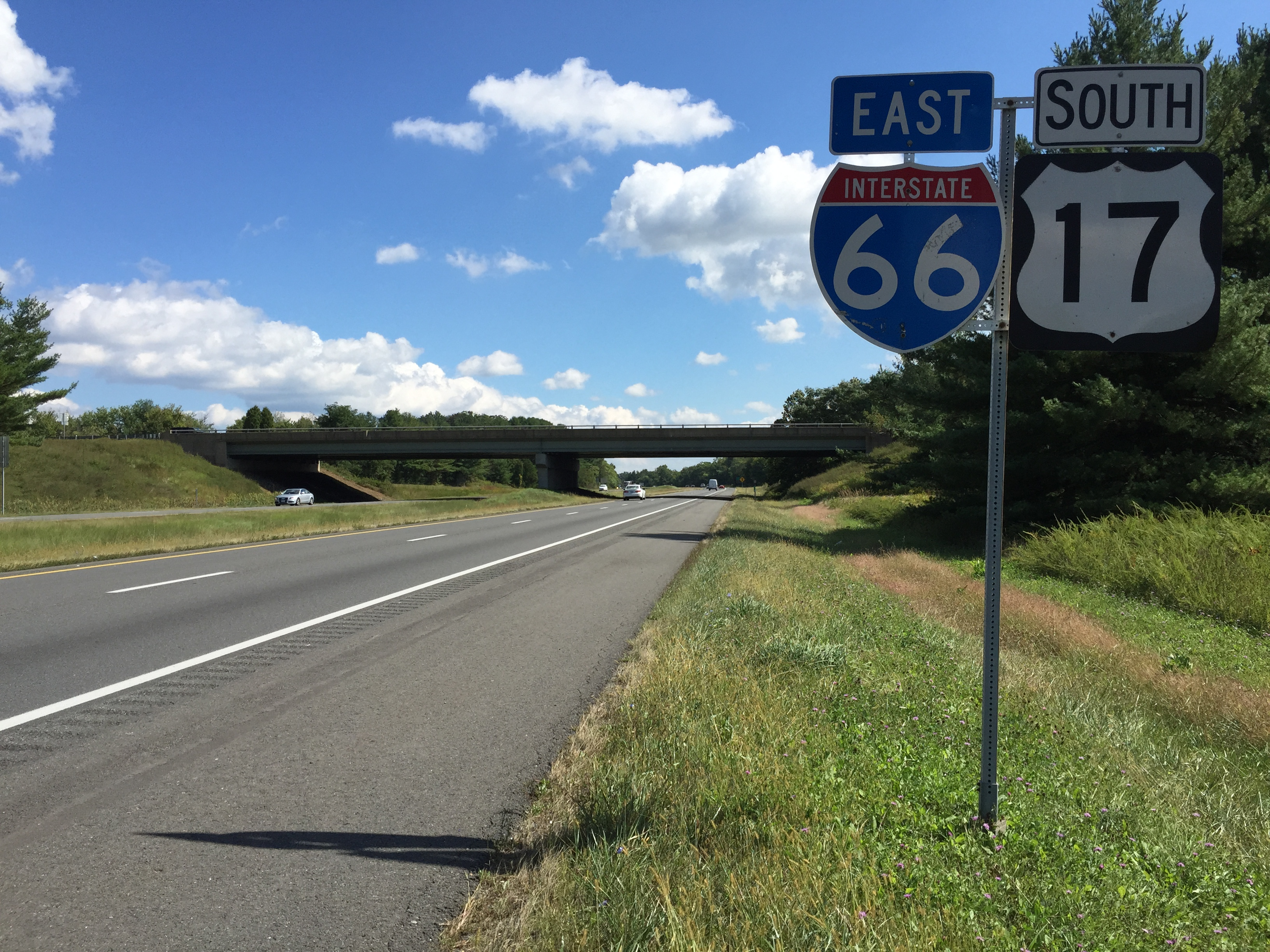
View south along I-66/US 17 at Exit 27 near Delaplane, northern Fauquier County

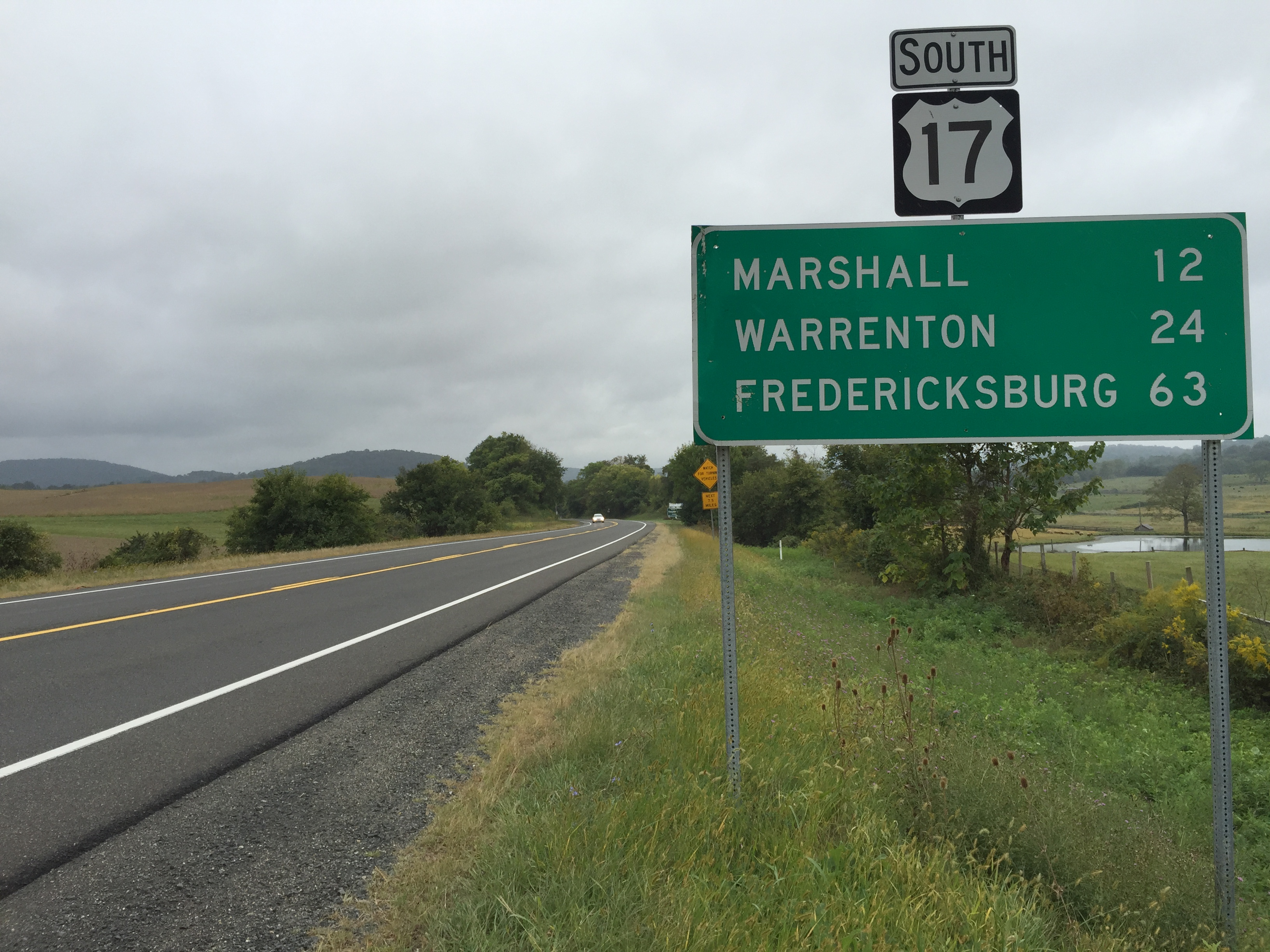
View south along US 17 between US 50 and SR 701 in northern Fauquier County

US 17 continues northwest as Warrenton Road, a four-lane divided highway that passes businesses and heads northeast of a park-and-ride lot. The road enters more rural areas and passes through Berea, Paynes Corner, Hartwood, and Storck on its way to the Fauquier County line at Deep Run. The U.S. Highway continues northwest as Marsh Road through Goldvein, Sumerduck, and Morrisville before crossing over Norfolk Southern Railway's Washington District and intersecting SR 28 (Catlett Road) in Bealeton. At Opal, US 17 joins US 15 and US 29 (James Madison Highway) to head north to Warrenton. At the three U.S. Highways' intersection with their respective business routes, the highway becomes a freeway. US 17, US 15, and US 29 have a diamond interchange with SR 643 (Meetze Road/Lee Street) before the combination partial cloverleaf and directional interchange where US 17 diverges from US 15 and US 29, which head toward Washington as Lee Highway, and all three highways meet the northern end of US 15 Bus. and US 29 Bus. (Lee Highway), which are used to reach the eastern end of US 211. US 17 briefly passes through the town limits of Warrenton while heading northwest to a partial interchange with the northern end of US 17 Bus. (James Madison Highway).

US 17 heads north out of Warrenton as James Madison Highway. The highway follows Cedar Run through a gap between Waters Mountain and Pignut Mountain. In Old Tavern, US 17 meets the southern end of SR 245 (Old Tavern Road). The U.S. Highway continues northwest from Old Tavern as Winchester Road to the southern edge of Marshall, where the highway meets I-66 at a diamond interchange. US 17 joins I-66 heading west while US 17 Bus. continues into the center of Marshall. West of Marshall, I-66 and US 17 have an interchange with the other end of US 17 Bus. and SR 55. The three highways head northwest along the freeway to Delaplane, where I-66 and the two other highways split. Just north of the partial interchange, SR 55 (John Marshall Highway) diverges from US 17 to parallel I-66 toward Front Royal. US 17 follows Winchester Road, a two-lane highway, through the center of Delaplane, where the U.S. Highway crosses Goose Creek and intersects Norfolk Southern Railway's B-Line at grade. The U.S. Highway continues north past the entrance to Sky Meadows State Park to its junction with US 50 (John Mosby Highway) in Paris. US 17 runs concurrently with US 50 for the remainder of its course.

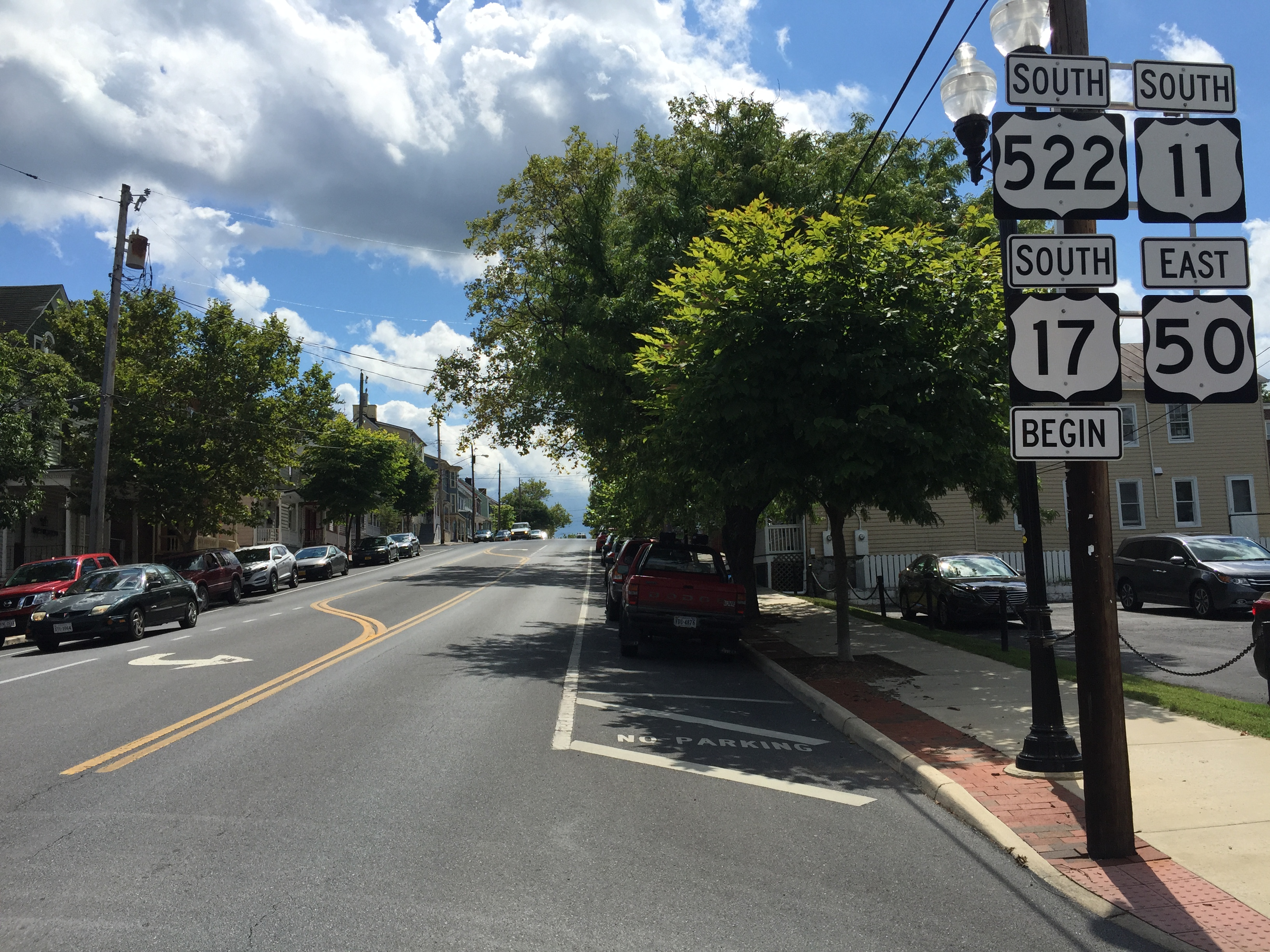
View south at the north end of US 17 at US 11/US 50/US 522 in Winchester

US 17 and US 50 become a divided highway that crosses the Blue Ridge Mountains at Ashby Gap and enters Clarke County. The two highways descend the mountain to their crossing of the Shenandoah River at Berrys. US 17 and US 50 intersect SR 255 (Bishop Meade Road) south of Millwood and US 340 (Lord Fairfax Highway) in the hamlet of Waterloo south of the town of Boyce. The highway's name becomes Millwood Pike on crossing Opequon Creek into Frederick County. Just east of Winchester, US 17 and US 50 intersect US 522 (Front Royal Pike) and ramps to and from northbound I-81. The three U.S. Highways enter the city of Winchester at their half-cloverleaf interchange with southbound I-81. The U.S. Highways follow Jubal Early Drive into Winchester, then turn right onto two-lane Millwood Avenue, which crosses CSX Transportation's Shenandoah Subdivision at grade before reaching US 17's northern terminus at the intersection of Cameron and Gerrard streets at the southern edge of downtown. US 50, US 522, and US 11 head north along one-way Cameron Street to the center of Winchester; southbound US 11 is accessed via Gerrard Street. Signage however indicates US 17's northern terminus is along Cameron Street at Clifford Street.

== History ==
Work began on December 2020 to widen US 17 from a two-lane road to a four-lane divided highway between its overpass over I-95 in Fredericksburg and just east of its intersection with Hospital Blvd and Germanna Point Drive. It also added a shared-use path, sidewalks, and pedestrian crossings; construction was completed on October 5, 2024.

== Major intersections ==
County	Location	mi	km	Destinations	Notes
City of Chesapeake		0.00	0.00	US 17 south (Ocean Highway) – Elizabeth City	North Carolina state line
City of Chesapeake		3.6	5.8	Ballahack Road – Cavalier Wildlife Management Area, Naval Support Activity Norfolk Northwest Annex	former SR 193 east
City of Chesapeake		10.29	16.56	US 17 Bus. north (South George Washington Highway) – Deep Creek	
City of Chesapeake		14.15	22.77	SR 165 (Moses Grandy Trail / Cedar Road) – Tidewater Community College Chesapeake Campus, Chesapeake Civic Center	
City of Chesapeake		14.9	24.0	Veterans Bridge over Southern Branch Elizabeth River	
City of Chesapeake		15.09	24.29	SR 166 north (Bainbridge Boulevard)	
City of Chesapeake		16.69	26.86	SR 190 (Great Bridge Boulevard) to SR 166	short SR 190 east overlap (southbound only)
City of Chesapeake		16.97	27.31	SR 168 south – Nags Head, Manteo, Great Bridge, Outer Banks	SR 168 exit 15B
City of Chesapeake		17.12	27.55	I-464 north / I-64 / SR 168 north to US 13 – Norfolk, Portsmouth, Virginia Beach, Norfolk Airport	south end of I-64 overlap; US 17 north follows exit 1; US 17 south follows exit 292 onto short SR 190 east overlap
City of Chesapeake				High Rise Bridge over Southern Branch Elizabeth River	
City of Chesapeake		21.43	34.49	I-64 / US 17 Bus. south (George Washington Highway) to I-664 north – Suffolk, Richmond, Hampton, Deep Creek	north end of I-64 overlap; US 17 north follows exit 296A
City of Chesapeake		22.33	35.94	US 13 / US 460 (South Military Highway) – Suffolk, Virginia Beach, Norfolk	
City of Chesapeake		23.33	37.55	SR 196 east (Canal Drive)	
City of Portsmouth		24.11	38.80	SR 239 (Victory Boulevard)	
City of Portsmouth		25.36	40.81	SR 141 north (George Washington Highway)	
City of Portsmouth		26.06	41.94	SR 337 (Portsmouth Boulevard)	
City of Portsmouth		26.68	42.94	I-264 (US 460 Alt.)	I-264 exit 5
City of Portsmouth				SR 337 Alt. (Turnpike Road) – Tunnel to Norfolk	
City of Portsmouth		27.54	44.32	US 58 (Airline Boulevard) – Portsmouth Marine Terminal truck route	no left turn southbound
City of Portsmouth				High Street to US 58	
City of Portsmouth				Churchland Bridge over Western Branch Elizabeth River	
City of Suffolk		31.22	50.24	SR 135 north (College Drive) to I-664 – Newport News, Tidewater Community College	
City of Suffolk		33.39	53.74	I-664 south – Chesapeake	I-664 exit 9
City of Suffolk		35.87	57.73	SR 164 east to I-664 north – Newport News, Hampton, Downtown Portsmouth	no southbound entrance
City of Suffolk		36.43	58.63	Nansemond River Bridge over Nansemond River	
City of Suffolk				Crittenden Road – Hobson	former SR 628
Chuckatuck Creek		41.73	67.16	Crittenden Bridge	
Isle of Wight	Bartlett	42.81	68.90	US 258 south (Brewers Neck Boulevard) / SR 32 south – Smithfield, Suffolk, Smithfield Historic District, St. Luke's Church	South end of concurrency with US 258 and SR 32
James River		44.98– 49.62	72.39– 79.86	James River Bridge	
City of Newport News		49.84	80.21	US 60 (Warwick Boulevard) – Fort Eustis, Downtown Newport News	interchange
City of Newport News		50.40	81.11	US 258 north (Mercury Boulevard) / SR 143 east (Jefferson Avenue) to I-64 – Hampton, Norfolk, Langley Field, Fort Monroe, Newport News Marine Terminal	north end of concurrency with US 258 / SR 32; south end of concurrency with SR 143
City of Newport News		51.71	83.22	SR 152 (Main Street) – Thomas Nelson Community College	
City of Newport News		53.40	85.94	Harpersville Road (SR 306 west))	
City of Newport News		54.52	87.74	SR 143 west (Jefferson Avenue) / SR 312 west (J. Clyde Morris Boulevard) – NN Williamsburg International Airport	North end of concurrency with SR 143
City of Newport News		55.58	89.45	I-64 – Williamsburg, Richmond, Hampton, Norfolk	I-64 exit 258
York	Tabb	58.05	93.42	SR 171 (Victory Boulevard) to I-64 – Newport News, Poquoson, NASA	
York	Tabb	58.98	94.92	SR 134 south – Langley AFB, Hampton	interchange
York	Grafton	62.13	99.99	SR 173 (Denbigh Boulevard / Goodwin Neck Road) – NN/Williamsburg Airport, Seaford	
York		63.52	102.23	SR 105 west / SR 1050 (Fort Eustis Boulevard) to I-64 – Fort Eustis, US Army Transportation Museum	
York		66.49	107.01	SR 238 (Goosley Road) – Naval Weapons Station, Yorktown, Coast Guard Training Center	
York	Yorktown	66.77	107.46	Colonial Parkway – Colonial Williamsburg, Jamestown, Yorktown Battlefield	Interchange
York River		68.12	109.63	Coleman Bridge	
Gloucester	Hayes	70.51	113.47	SR 216 east (Guinea Road) / SR 1219 west (Hook Road) – Hayes Store, Achilles	
Gloucester	Gloucester Courthouse	79.56	128.04	US 17 Bus. north / SR 1075 (Main Street) to SR 3 west / SR 14 east – Gloucester CH, Mathews, Gloucester Historic District	
Gloucester	Gloucester Courthouse	81.24	130.74	US 17 Bus. south / SR 14 east (Main Street) / SR 619 (Fiddlers Green Road) – Gloucester CH, Mathews, Gloucester Historic District, Beaverdam Park Main Entrance	South end of concurrency with SR 14
Gloucester	Ark			SR 606 (Ark Road) – Allmonds Wharf, Sassafras	former SR 217 south
Gloucester	Adner	89.07	143.34	SR 14 west (Adner Road) – West Point, Middle Peninsula Regional Airport	North end of concurrency with SR 14
Gloucester	Glenns	93.84	151.02	SR 33 west (Lewis Puller Highway) / SR 198 east (Glenns Road) – West Point, Mathews	South end of concurrency with SR 33
Middlesex	Saluda	96.20	154.82	US 17 Bus. north / SR 33 east (Gloucester Road) – Saluda, Urbanna, Deltaville, Irvington, Kilmarnock	North end of concurrency with SR 33
Middlesex	Saluda	97.22	156.46	US 17 Bus. south (General Puller Highway) to SR 33 east – Saluda, Urbanna, Deltaville, Irvington, Kilmarnock	
Middlesex				SR 602 (Old Virginia Street) to SR 227 – Remlik, Urbanna	
Middlesex				SR 640 (Waterview Road) – Samos, Water View	former SR 226 east
Essex	Center Cross			SR 684 (Howerton Road / Bowlers Road) – Dunbrooke, Bowlers Wharf	former SR 199
Essex	Brays	123.19	198.26	US 360 west (Richmond Highway) – Richmond, Tappahannock-Essex County Airport	South end of concurrency with US 360
Essex	Tappahannock	125.63	202.18	US 360 east / SR 1014 (Queen Street) – Warsaw, Rappahannock Community College Warsaw Campus	North end of concurrency with US 360
Essex	Tappahannock			SR 657 (Marsh Street)	former SR 215 west
Caroline	Port Royal Cross Roads	152.18	244.91	US 301 (A.P. Hill Boulevard) – Richmond, Baltimore, Fort A.P. Hill, George Washington Birthplace National Monument	
Spotsylvania	New Post	166.30	267.63	US 17 Bus. north / SR 2 (Sandy Lane Drive / Tidewater Trail) – Bowling Green, Fredericksburg, Fort A.P. Hill	
Spotsylvania		172.02	276.84	US 1 south (Jefferson Davis Highway) – Ashland, Richmond, Massaponax, Spotsylvania	South end of concurrency with US 1
Spotsylvania		173.20	278.74	I-95 south / US 1 north (Jefferson Davis Highway) – Richmond, Fredericksburg	north end of concurrency with US 1; south end of concurrency with I-95; US 17 south follows exit 126
City of Fredericksburg		176.90	284.69	SR 3 – Culpeper, Fredericksburg	I-95 exit 130
Rappahannock River		179.19	288.38	Rappahannock Falls Bridge	
Stafford		179.93	289.57	I-95 north / US 17 Bus. south (Warrenton Road) – Washington, Falmouth, Fredericksburg	north end of concurrency with I-95; US 17 north follows exit 133
Stafford	Berea	182.4	293.5	Celebrate Virginia Parkway	interchange
Fauquier	Morrisville			SR 634 (Courtneys Corner Road) / SR 806 (Elk Run Road)	former SR 233 north
Fauquier	Bealeton	203.75	327.90	SR 28 (Catlett Road) – Remington, Manassas, Warrenton-Fauquier Airport	
Fauquier	Opal	206.99	333.12	US 15 south / US 29 south (James Madison Highway) / SR 687 (Opal Road) – Culpeper, Charlottesville	South end of concurrency with US 15 and US 29; interchange
Fauquier		211.70	340.70	US 15 Bus. north / US 17 Bus. north / US 29 Bus. north / SR 880 (Lord Fairfax Road) – Warrenton, Lord Fairfax Community College Fauquier Campus	
Fauquier	Warrenton	212.26	341.60	SR 643 (Meetze Road / Lee Street) – Warrenton	interchange
Fauquier	Warrenton	214.14	344.62	US 15 north / US 29 north / US 15 Bus. south / US 29 Bus. south to US 211 west – Leesburg, Washington, Warrenton, Luray	interchange; north end of concurrency with US 15 and US 29
Fauquier		216.36	348.20	US 17 Bus. south – Warrenton	interchange; no northbound exit
Fauquier	Old Tavern	223.76	360.11	SR 245 north (Old Tavern Road) / SR 703 (Enon Church Road) – The Plains	
Fauquier		225.78	363.36	I-66 east / US 17 Bus. north (Winchester Road) – Washington, Marshall	south end of concurrency with I-66; US 17 south follows exit 28
Fauquier		227.05	365.40	SR 55 east / SR 647 (US 17 Bus. south) – Marshall	I-66 exit 27; south end of concurrency with SR 55
Fauquier		230.47	370.91	I-66 west – Front Royal, Strasburg	north end of concurrency with I-66; US 17 north follows exit 23
Fauquier		231.11	371.94	SR 55 west (John Marshall Highway) – Front Royal	North end of concurrency with SR 55
Fauquier	Paris	238.27	383.46	US 50 east (John S. Mosby Highway) – Middleburg, Fairfax, Washington	South end of concurrency with US 50
Clarke				SR 606 (Mount Carmel Road)	former SR 276 north
Clarke		244.79	393.95	SR 255 north (Bishop Meade Road) / SR 624 (Red Gate Road) – Millwood	
Clarke	Waterloo	247.62	398.51	US 340 (Lord Fairfax Highway) – White Post, Front Royal, Berryville, Shenandoah National Park, Skyline Drive	
Frederick		254.72	409.93	US 522 south (Front Royal Pike) – Airport, Front Royal	south end of concurrency with US 522
Frederick		254.88	410.19	I-81 – Roanoke, Martinsburg	I-81 exit 313
City of Winchester		255.83	411.72	US 11 south (Gerrard Street)	south end of US 11 overlap
City of Winchester		256.22	412.35	US 11 north / US 522 north (South Cameron Street) / US 50 west (East Cork Street)	Northern terminus; north end of US 11 / US 50 / US 522 overlap
1.000 mi = 1.609 km; 1.000 km = 0.621 mi: Concurrency terminus; Incomplete access; Tolled

== See also ==
- U.S. Route 117

U.S. Route 17
Previous state: North Carolina	Virginia	Next state: Terminus

< SR 37	Two‑digit State Routes; 1923-1933	SR 39 >
< SR 39	Two‑digit State Routes; 1923-1933	SR 41 >
< SR 326	Spurs of SR 32; 1923–1928	none
< SR 502	District 5 State Routes; 1928–1933	SR 504 >
< SR 514	District 5 State Routes; 1928–1933	SR 516 >
< SR 601	District 6 State Routes; 1928–1933	SR 603 >
