= Billups =

Billups may refer to:

== Places ==
- Billups Branch, a stream in the U.S. states of Iowa and Missouri
- Billups House, located near Moon, Mathews County, Virginia
- Billups, Mississippi, a village in Lowndes County, Mississippi

== People ==
- Chauncey Billups (born 1976), American basketball player and coach
- Jalen Billups (born 1992), American international basketball player
- Pope B. Billups (1889–1955), American lawyer and politician
- Richard Billups (1878–1948), American politician
- Rodney Billups (born 1983), American basketball coach
- Tom Billups (born 1964), American rugby union player and coach

== See also ==
- Billups Neon Crossing Signal
