= Virginia State Route 198 =

State highway in eastern Virginia, US

State Route 198

Route information
- Maintained by VDOT
- Length: 23.33 mi (37.55 km)
- Existed: 1933–present
- Tourist routes: Virginia Byway

Major junctions
- West end: US 17 / SR 33 at Glenns
- East end: SR 642 / SR 653 near Moon

Location
- Country: United States
- State: Virginia
- Counties: Gloucester, Mathews

Highway system
- Virginia Routes; Interstate; US; Primary; Secondary; Byways; History; HOT lanes
← SR 197	→ SR 199

State Route 198 (SR 198) is a primary state highway in the Middle Peninsula region of the U.S. state of Virginia. It runs from the U.S. Route 17 and State Route 33 split at Glenns east via Cobbs Creek and Mathews to State Routes 642 and 653 near Moon.

== Route description ==
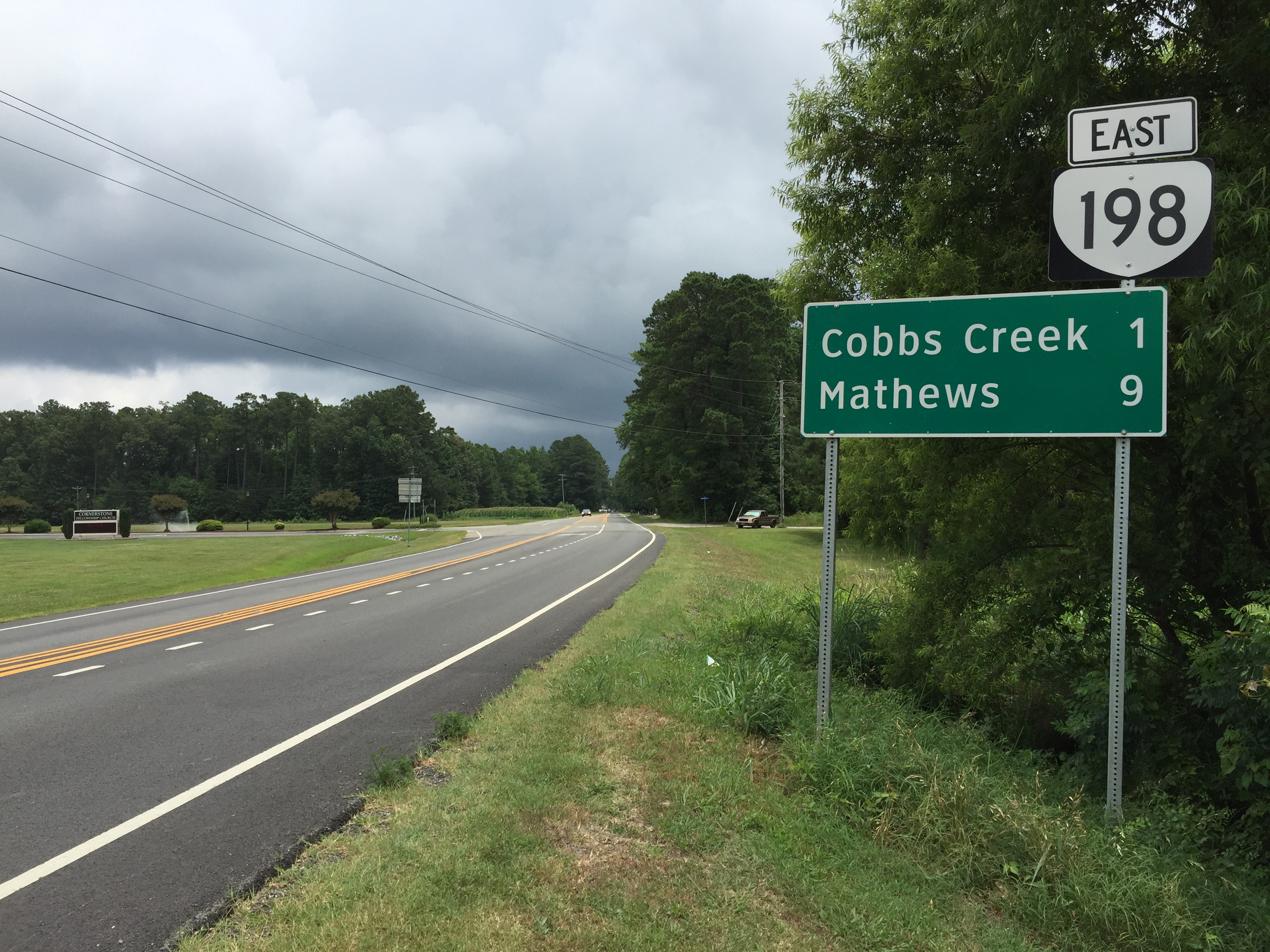
View east along SR 198 at SR 3 in Dixie

State Route 198 begins at the intersection of U.S. Route 17 (US 17) and SR 33 at Glenns in Gloucester County. US 17 is a north–south highway while SR 33 comes from the west and joins US 17 heading to the north. From the intersection, SR 198 heads to the southeast along Glenns Road, a narrow two-lane undivided road lined with trees and dotted with houses. Four miles (6.4 km) to the east, SR 198 turns east onto Dutton Road. Turning west takes traffic back to US 17 along Pampa Road, which is designated SR 601.

Heading east along Dutton Road, SR 198 continues through an area of farmland before turning south to cross a slough which connects to the adjacent Piankatank River. It turns to the southeast and intersects Harcum Road, which is designated SR 606. East of Harcum Road, the route enters Mathews County.

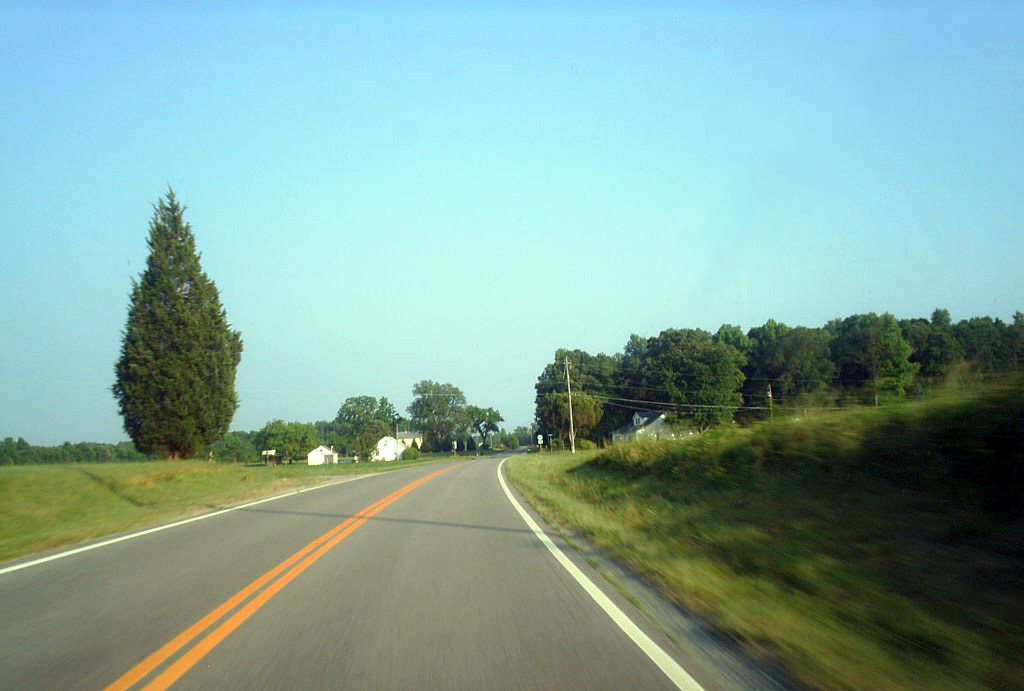
SR 198 passes through mostly rural areas.

One half-mile (0.4 km) into Mathews County, SR 198 intersects Windsor Road, which carries SR 3 from the south. The two routes head east together for 1 1/2 miles (2.4 km), passing through the town of Dutton, before SR 3 splits off to the north to cross the Piankatank River. From SR 3, SR 198 travels in a semi-circular route through the communities of Cobbs Creek and Blakes. East of Blakes, the highway turns to the southeast towards Hudgins, where SR 198 meets the western end of SR 223.

One mile (1.6 km) south of Hudgins, SR 14 joins SR 198 from the west. The two routes head south for 1 2/3 miles (2.7 km) until Mathews, where SR 14 splits away to the south. SR 198 heads east out of Mathews along Buckley Hill Road. One mile east of Mathews, at an intersection with SR 653, the SR 198 designation ends. SR 642 begins at this point and continues along Buckley Hill Road towards Moon.

== Major intersections ==
County	Location	mi	km	Destinations	Notes
Gloucester	Glenns	0.00	0.00	US 17 / SR 33 (George Washington Memorial Highway / Lewis Puller Highway) – West Point, Gloucester, Saluda, Middle Peninsula Regional Airport	Western terminus
Gloucester	Cash	4.45	7.16	SR 601 (Pampa Road) to US 17 south	former SR 198 west
Gloucester	Harcum	7.37	11.86	SR 606 (Harcum Road)	
Mathews	Soles	11.91	19.17	SR 3 east (Windsor Road) – Gloucester	West end of SR 3 overlap
Mathews	Dixie	13.46	21.66	SR 3 west (Twiggs Ferry Road) – Saluda, Kilmarnock, Irvington	East end of SR 3 overlap
Mathews	Hudgins	19.70	31.70	SR 223 north (Cricket Hill Road) – Gwynn's Island, U.S. Coast Guard Station	
Mathews		20.63	33.20	SR 14 west (John Clayton Memorial Highway) – Gloucester	West end of SR 14 overlap
Mathews	Mathews	22.32	35.92	SR 14 east (Main Street)	East end of SR 14 overlap
Mathews		23.33	37.55	SR 642 (Buckley Hall Road) / SR 653 (Holly Point Road) – Diggs, Haven Beach	Eastern terminus
1.000 mi = 1.609 km; 1.000 km = 0.621 mi: Concurrency terminus

< SR 600	District 6 State Routes; 1928–1933	SR 602 >
