= Fort Nonsense =

Fort Nonsense may refer to:

- Fort Nonsense (Annapolis, Maryland), listed on the National Register of Historic Places
- Fort Nonsense (Morristown, New Jersey)
- Fort Nonsense (Erie County, Ohio), nickname for a War-of-1812 encampment in northern Ohio
- Fort Nonsense, Virginia
- Fort Nonsense, an alternative name for Fort Bonneville in Wyoming
