= Elsom =

Elsom may refer to:

== People ==
- Allan Elsom (1925–2010), New Zealand rugby union player
- Annie Elsom (1867–1962), New Zealand florist
- Cecil Elsom (1912–2006), founder of EPR Architects, London
- Isobel Elsom (1893–1981), English actress
- John Elsom (1939–2023), chairman of Leicester City football club, England
- Jonathan Elsom (born 1938), New Zealand actor
- Rocky Elsom (born 1983), Australian rugby union player

== Other meanings ==
- Elsom, Virginia, United States, an unincorporated community
