= Diggs (disambiguation) =

Diggs is a surname. It may also refer to:

- Diggs baronets, an extinct title in the Baronetage of England
- Diggs, Virginia, United States, an unincorporated community
- "Diggs" (The Simpsons), an episode of The Simpsons
- Ra Diggs, stage name of Ronald Herron (born c. 1982), American rapper and convicted murderer, gang leader and drug trafficker

== See also ==
- Digges (disambiguation)
- Digg, a social news website
