= Berea =

Berea may refer to:

== Places ==
=== Greece ===
- Beroea, a place mentioned in the Acts of the Apostles, now known as Veria or Veroia
- Veria, historically spelled and sometimes transliterated as Berea and site of the ancient city of Beroea

=== Lesotho ===
- Berea District

=== Romania ===
- Berea, a village in Ciumești Commune, Satu Mare County
- Berea, a tributary of the Valea Neagră in Satu Mare County

=== South Africa ===
- Berea, Durban
- Berea, Gauteng

=== United States ===
- Berea, Iowa
- Berea, Kentucky
- Berea, Baltimore, Maryland
- Berea, Nebraska
- Berea, North Carolina, an unincorporated community in Granville County
- Berea, Ohio
- Berea, South Carolina
- Berea, Giles County, Tennessee
- Berea, Warren County, Tennessee
- Berea, Virginia
- Berea, West Virginia

== Other uses ==
- Helena Espinosa Berea (c. 1895 – c. 1960), Mexican academic
- Berea College, in Berea, Kentucky
- Berea International Theological Seminary, Seoul, South Korea
- Berea Sandstone, a type of sandstone named for Berea, Ohio
- Berea (genus), a genus of parasitic copepods in the family Chondracanthidae
- Berean Institute, vocational education school in Philadelphia

== See also ==
- Aleppo, Syria, known as Beroea (Βέροια) in antiquity
- Bereans, inhabitants of the biblical city of Berea
