= VA14 =

VA-14 has the following meanings:

- Attack Squadron 14 (U.S. Navy)
- Virginia's 14th congressional district
- State Route 14 (Virginia)
