= Foster, Virginia =

Unincorporated community in Virginia, United States

- Unincorporated community
- Location within Virginia Location within the United States
- Coordinates: 37°27′10″N 76°23′06″W
- Country: United States
- State: Virginia
- County: Mathews
- Elevation: 16 ft (4.9 m)
- Time zone: UTC-5 (Eastern (EST))
  - Summer (DST): UTC-4 (EDT)
- ZIP code: 23056
- Area code: 804
- GNIS feature ID: 1499442

Foster is an unincorporated community in Mathews County, Virginia, United States. Foster is located on Virginia Route 14, 3.5 miles (5.6 km) west-northwest of Mathews. Foster has a post office with ZIP code 23056.
