= Dutton, Virginia =

Unincorporated community in Virginia, United States

- Unincorporated community
- Location within Virginia Location within the United States
- Coordinates: 37°29′52″N 76°27′27″W
- Country: United States
- State: Virginia
- County: Gloucester
- Elevation: 66 ft (20 m)
- Time zone: UTC-5 (Eastern (EST))
  - Summer (DST): UTC-4 (EDT)
- ZIP code: 23050
- Area code: 804
- GNIS feature ID: 1477287

Dutton is an unincorporated community in Gloucester County, Virginia, United States. Dutton is located on Virginia State Route 198, 7 miles (11 km) north-northeast of Gloucester Courthouse. Dutton has a post office with ZIP code 23050.
