= Veterans Bridge (Chesapeake, Virginia) =

- Coordinates: 36°44′N 76°17′W
- Carries: four lanes of US 17
- Crosses: Elizabeth River (Virginia)
- Locale: Chesapeake, Virginia
- Owner: City of Chesapeake

Characteristics
- Design: fixed span
- Longest span: 2 x 285 feet (87 m)
- Clearance below: 95 feet (29 m)

History
- Construction start: January 2013
- Construction cost: $345.2 million USD
- Inaugurated: December 2014
- Replaces: Dominion Boulevard Steel Bridge

Statistics
- Toll: With EZ-Pass $1.34; Without: $3.34

The Veterans Bridge is a fixed span concrete bridge that spans the Southern Branch of the Elizabeth River in the Deep Creek neighborhood of Chesapeake in southeastern Virginia, USA. The bridge, which partially opened in 2014, currently carries two lanes of U.S. Route 17 (US 17; Dominion Blvd) on each direction across its northbound and southbound spans. The corridor frequently acts as a bypass route for congested I-64 High Rise Bridge traffic. It replaces the much shorter and smaller Dominion Boulevard Steel Bridge, which because of its 11-foot underwater clearance opened on average of 16 times per day.

Tolling began on the route on February 9, 2017. Most cars, SUVs and passenger trucks that use the bridge and utilize an E-ZPass transponder will only pay $1 to cross. Larger vehicles, such as transit busses and semi-trailer trucks, will face an E-ZPass toll ranging from $1.50 to $2.50, depending on its classification. However, those same vehicles crossing without a transponder will still pay their respective base toll, but will also incur a $2 processing fee in addition to the original toll.

The toll is expected to increase by approximately 5 percent each year through 2035.
