= Billups House =

Historic house in Virginia, United States

- U.S. National Register of Historic Places
- Virginia Landmarks Register
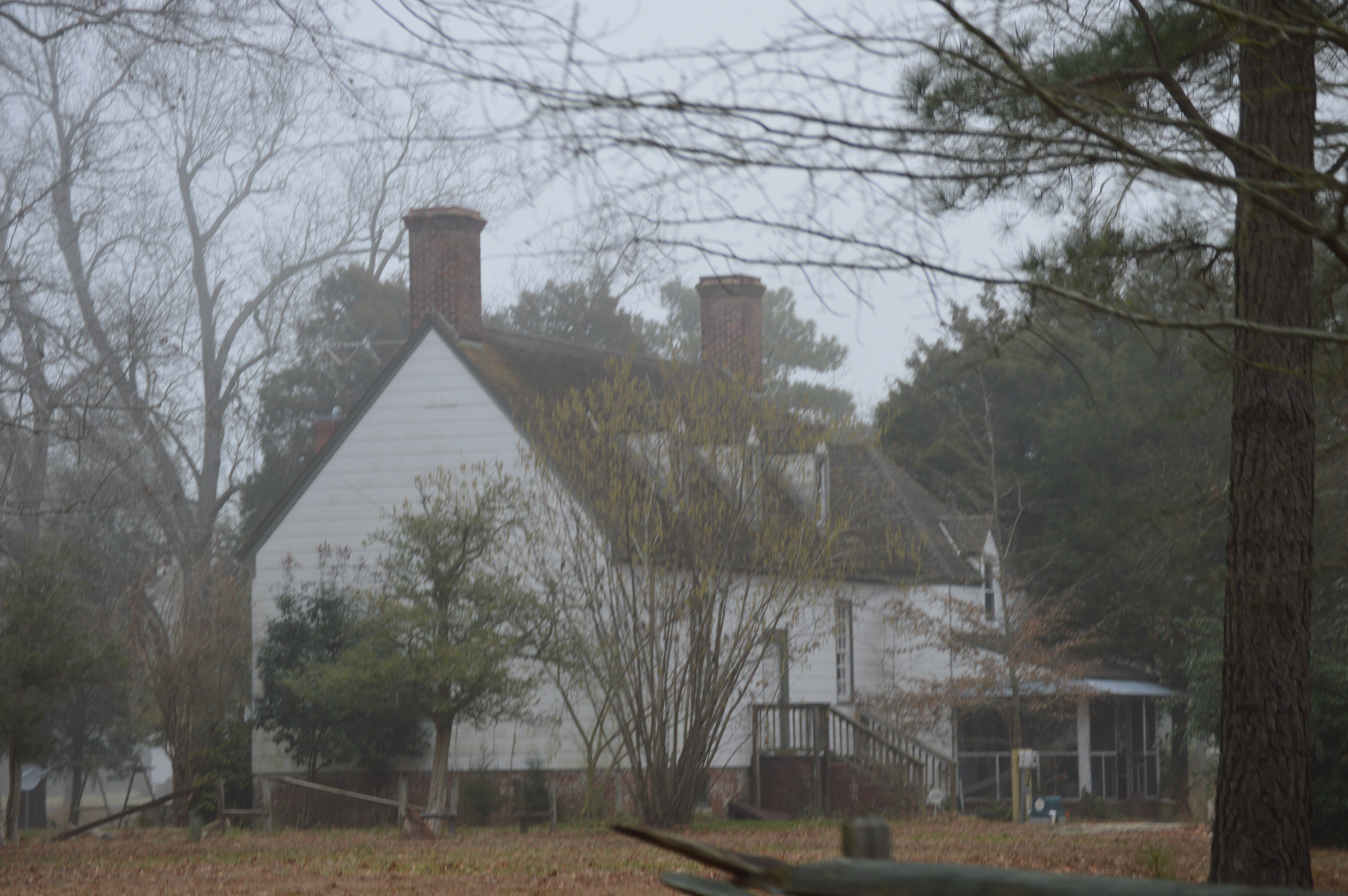
- Front and side

- Location within Virginia Location within the United States
- Location: East of Moon, near Moon, Virginia
- Coordinates: 37°26′31″N 76°17′11″W
- Area: 9 acres (3.6 ha)
- Built: c. 1770-1790
- NRHP reference No.: 80004199
- VLR No.: 057-0023

Significant dates
- Added to NRHP: March 26, 1980
- Designated VLR: May 17, 1977

Billups House, also known as Milford, is a historic home located near Moon, Mathews County, Virginia. It was built between about 1770 and 1790, and is a 1 1/2-story, three-bay, frame dwelling set upon a low brick basement. It has a gable roof with dormers and interior end chimneys. The interior has a central-passage, double-pile Georgian plan.

It was listed on the National Register of Historic Places in 1980.

The home was owned by Billups descendants until 2013.
