= Steel Bridge (disambiguation) =

The Steel Bridge is a crossing of the Willamette River in Portland, Oregon.

Steel Bridge may also refer to:

- Steel bridge, a type of metal structure
- Steel Bridge (Chesapeake), formerly on Dominion Boulevard, South Hampton Roads, Virginia
- Steel Bridge Songfest, an annual music festival in Wisconsin
