= Horace W. Palmer =

American lawyer and politician

Horace Wilbur Palmer (August 16, 1878 – November 10, 1953) was an American lawyer and politician from New York.

== Life ==
Palmer was born on August 16, 1878, in Coxsackie, New York, the son of Horace Palmer and Margaretta Brown.

Palmer graduated from Cornell University in 1900. He then worked with the New York Central Railroad Signaling Department in Utica until 1909, when he moved to New York City. He graduated from the New York Law School in 1911, and after he was admitted to the bar a few months later he began practicing law. He practiced law for many years with Benjamin B. Avery and Charles A. Taussing at 220 Broadway. He later maintained a law office in the Singer Building, and continued to practice law until his death.

In 1921, Palmer was elected to the New York State Assembly as a Republican, representing the New York County 21st District. He served in the Assembly in 1922. From 1925 to 1931, he was Deputy Attorney General, Labor Department under Attorney General Albert Ottinger.

Palmer was a member of the Freemasons, the Royal Arch Masons, the Knights Templar, and the Shriners. He conducted genealogical research and on the Palmer family from 1915 until his death. He died before he was able to publish his research. His wife Nellie Morse, who he married in 1915, published the book on the Palmer family for him after his death.

Palmer died on November 10, 1953. He was last living in Madison, New Jersey. He was buried in the Riverside Cemetery in Coxsackie.

New York State Assembly
Preceded by John Clifford Hawkins	New York State Assembly; New York County, 21st District; 1922	Succeeded by Henri W. Shields
