= Glenns, Virginia =

Unincorporated community in Virginia, United States

- Unincorporated community
- Location within Virginia Location within the United States
- Coordinates: 37°33′57″N 76°36′46″W
- Country: United States
- State: Virginia
- County: Gloucester
- Elevation: 92 ft (28 m)
- Time zone: UTC-5 (Eastern (EST))
  - Summer (DST): UTC-4 (EDT)
- Area code: 804
- GNIS feature ID: 1477356

Glenns is an unincorporated community in Gloucester County, Virginia, United States. Glenns is located at the junction of U.S. Route 17 and state routes 33 and 198, 5.5 miles (8.9 km) south-southwest of Urbanna. It is home to one of the campuses of Rappahannock Community College.
