= Hesse (Blakes, Virginia) =

Historic house in Virginia, United States

- U.S. National Register of Historic Places
- Virginia Landmarks Register
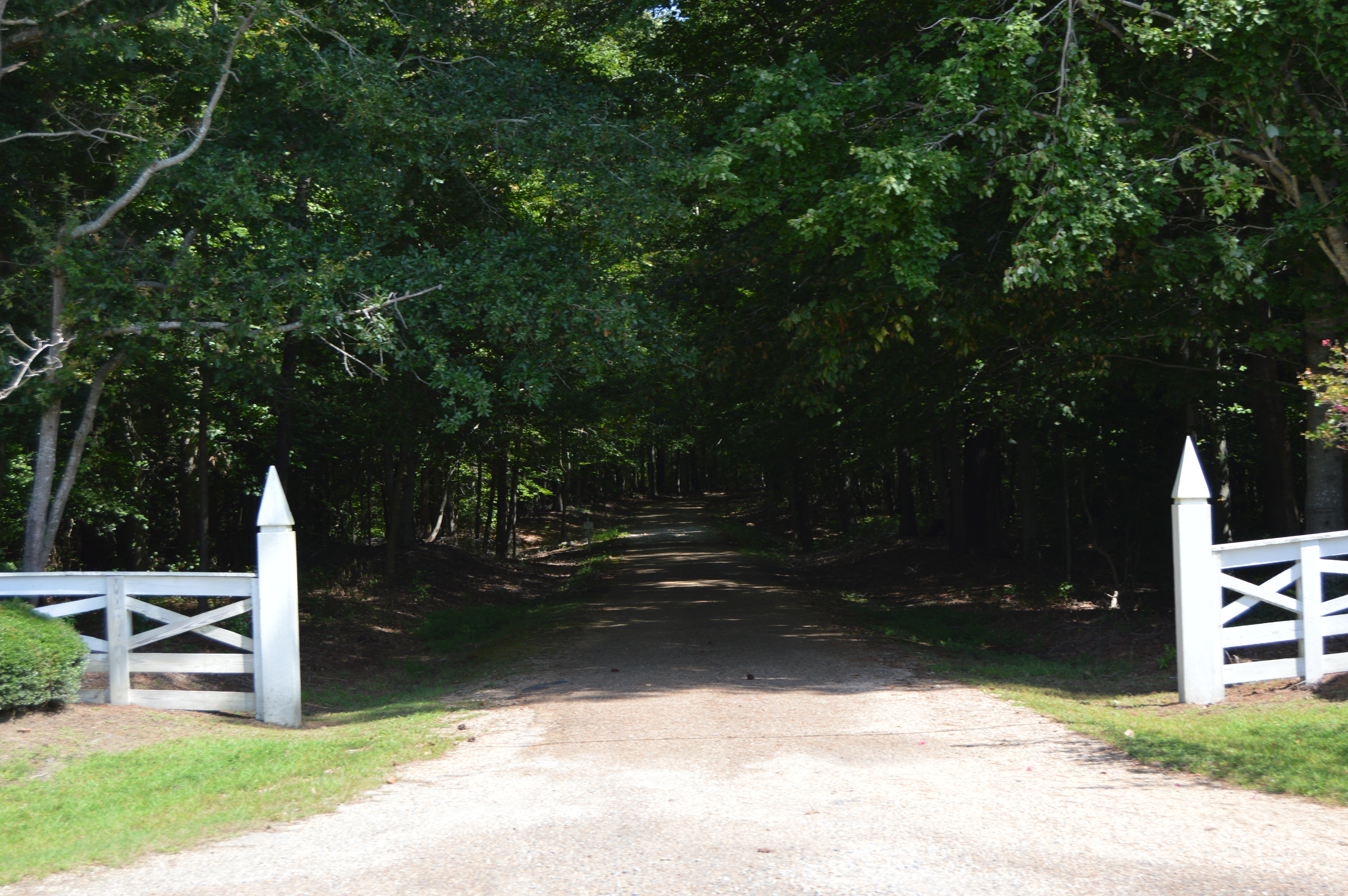
- Property entrance

- Location within Virginia Location within the United States
- Location: East of Cobbs Creek off VA 631, near Blakes, Virginia
- Coordinates: 37°30′50″N 76°22′03″W
- Area: 150 acres (61 ha)
- Built: c. 1725
- Architectural style: Georgian
- NRHP reference No.: 74002137
- VLR No.: 057-0007

Significant dates
- Added to NRHP: February 12, 1974
- Designated VLR: November 20, 1973

Hesse is a historic plantation house located near Blakes, Mathews County, Virginia. It was built about 1725, and is a five-bay, two-story Georgian style brick dwelling. It has a single-pile plan and is topped by a gable roof. A modern five-bay flanking south wing was built in 1952.

It was listed on the National Register of Historic Places in 1974.
