= Shelly Archeological District =

Archaeological site in Virginia, United States

- U.S. National Register of Historic Places
- U.S. Historic district
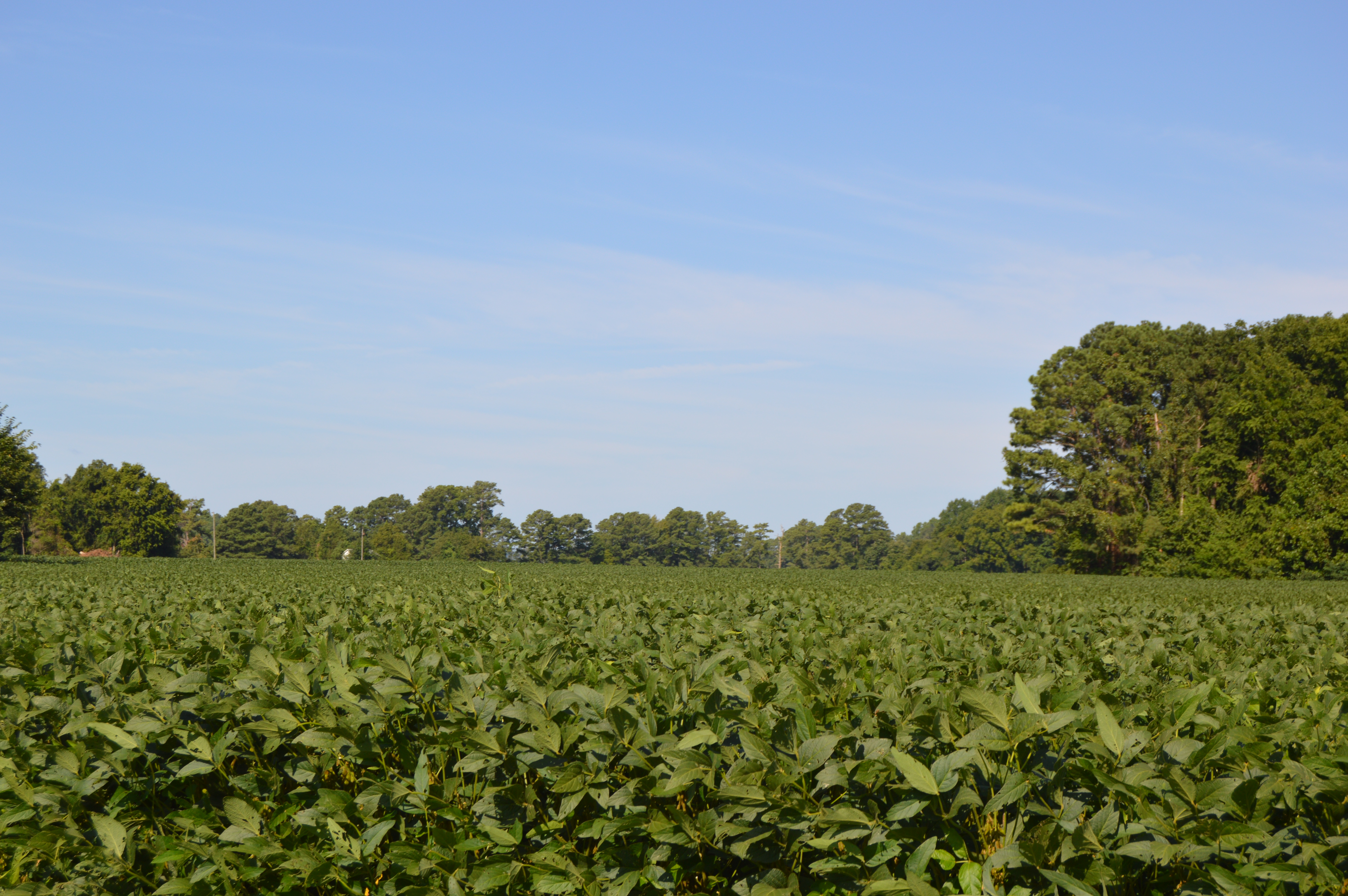
- Overview from the east
- Nearest city: Hayes, Virginia
- Area: 176 acres (71 ha)
- NRHP reference No.: 89001932
- Added to NRHP: July 12, 1990

The Shelly Archeological District is an area encompassing a number of historical archaeological sites in Gloucester County, Virginia. The district, which covers 176 acres (71 ha) near the confluence of Carter's Creek and the York River, includes at least 29 distinct historic and prehistoric sites, including an extensive shell midden, which gave the area its name. The site is one that was proposed in the 19th and 20th centuries as the site of Werowocomoco. The area also includes remains of 17th-century English settlements.

The district was listed on the National Register of Historic Places in 1990.

== See also ==
- National Register of Historic Places listings in Gloucester County, Virginia
