= Henri W. Shields =

American politician (1884–1951)

Henri William Shields (February 23, 1884 – July 2, 1951) was an American lawyer and politician. He was reportedly the first African-American elected to a state legislature as a Democrat.

== Life ==
Shields was born on February 23, 1884 in Knoxville, Tennessee, the son of Anderson William and Frances Barbara Shields.

Shields attended public school, the M Street High School, and Howard University in Washington, D.C. He moved to New York City in 1901, and in 1906 he returned to D.C. to attend the Howard University School of Law. He graduated from there in 1909, and in 1912 he was admitted to practice before the Supreme Court of the United States. He then returned to New York City and worked as a lawyer there.

Shields was a member of the Knights of Columbus, the Chicopee Democratic Club and Tammany Hall. In 1922, he was elected to the New York State Assembly as a Democrat, representing the New York County 21st District. This made him the first African-American to be elected to any state legislature as a Democrat. He served in the Assembly in 1923 and 1924. He lost the 1924 re-election to Pope B. Billups. In 1925, he was elected to the New York City Board of Aldermen in the 21st Manhattan district, which was in Harlem. He lost the 1927 re-election to John Clifford Hawkins.

Shields died at home from a heart attack on July 2, 1951. He was cremated and his ashes were kept in the room where he conferred with clients for 35 years.

== See also ==
- List of African-American officeholders (1900–1959)

New York State Assembly
| Preceded by Horace W. Palmer | New York State Assembly; New York County, 21st District; 1923–1924 | Succeeded by Pope B. Billups |
