= Hayes, Virginia =

Unincorporated community in Virginia, United States

- Unincorporated community
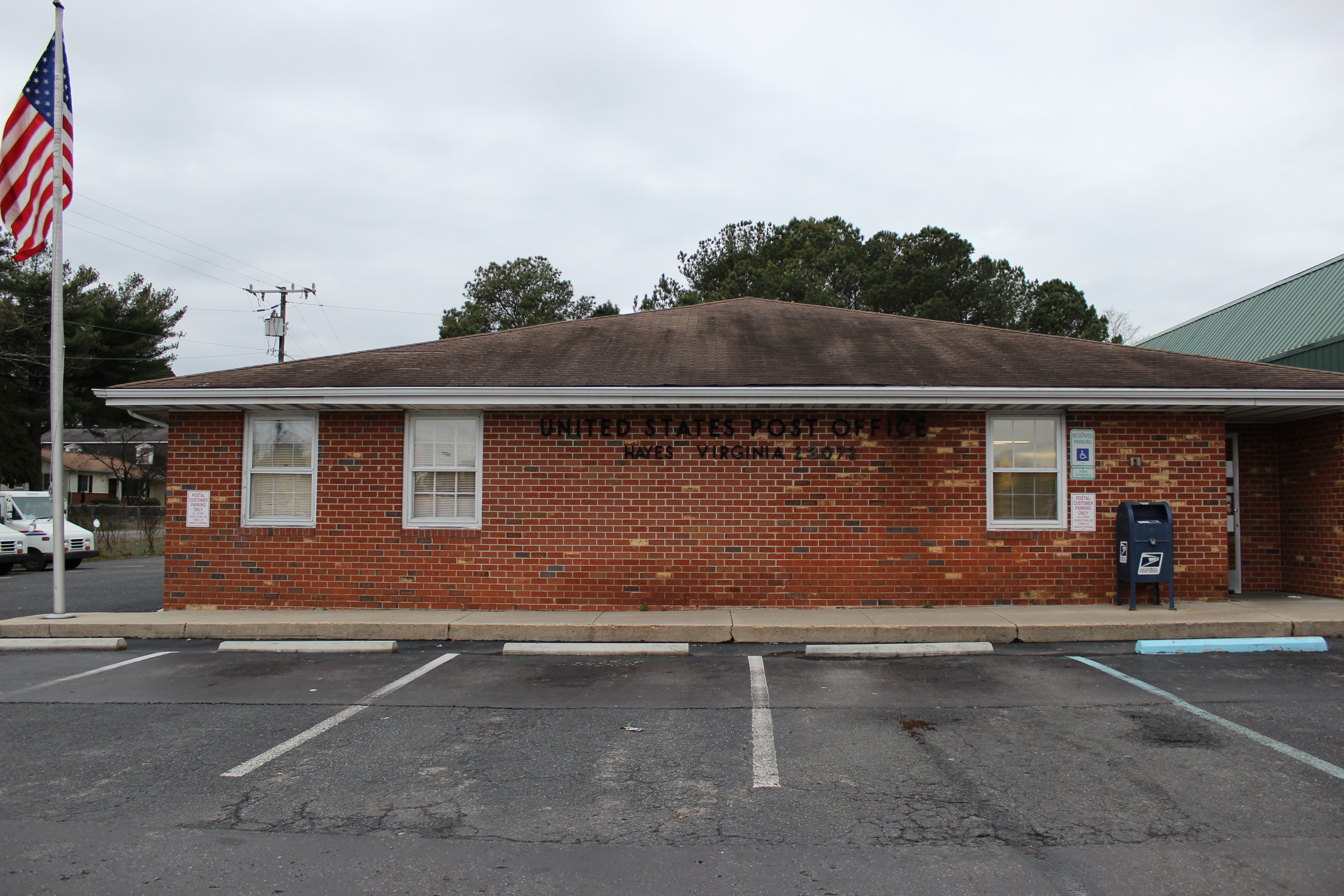
- Post Office, located in Hayes Plaza shopping center.

- Location within Virginia Location within the United States
- Coordinates: 37°16′42″N 76°30′14″W
- Country: United States
- State: Virginia
- County: Gloucester
- Elevation: 33 ft (10 m)
- Time zone: UTC-5 (Eastern (EST))
  - Summer (DST): UTC-4 (EDT)
- ZIP code: 23072
- Area code: 804
- GNIS feature ID: 1493063

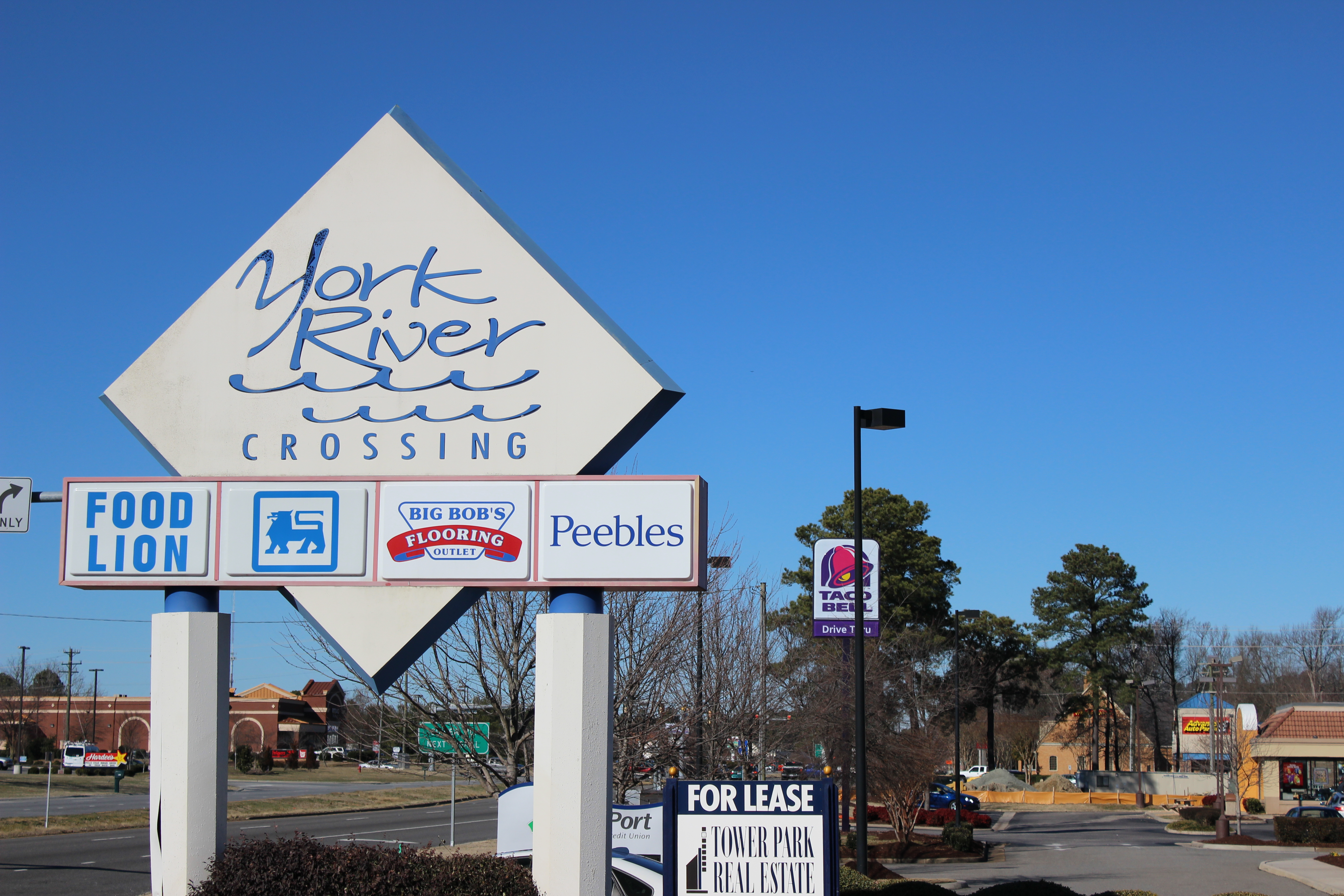
The York River Crossing shopping center, one of Hayes' major shopping destinations.

Hayes is an unincorporated community in Gloucester County, Virginia, United States. Hayes is located along U.S. Route 17, 1.5 miles (2.4 km) north-northwest of Gloucester Point. Hayes has a post office with ZIP code 23072.

Hayes features many shopping centers, such as the York River Crossing shopping center, Hayes Plaza shopping center, and Hayes Stores shopping center, making it one of the two large commerce centers of Gloucester County with the other being Gloucester Courthouse.

The Shelly Archeological District was added to the National Register of Historic Places in 1990.

There are many who believe Hayes, Virginia is named after the Hayes family. Lt. Hugh Hayes served in the Polk’s Regiment during the American Revolution. The Library of Congress article is titled, "Gloucester. One of the first chapters of the Commonwealth of Virginia."
