= Digges =

Digges may refer to:

== People ==
- Digges (surname)
- Jeremiah Digges, pen name of Josef Berger (speechwriter) (1903–1971), American journalist, author and speechwriter

== Places in Canada ==
- Digges station, a Via Rail flag stop in Manitoba
- Digges Islands, Nunavut
- Digges Sound, Nunavut

== See also ==
- Digges Amendment
- Diggs (disambiguation)
