= Opal, Virginia =

- Census-designated place
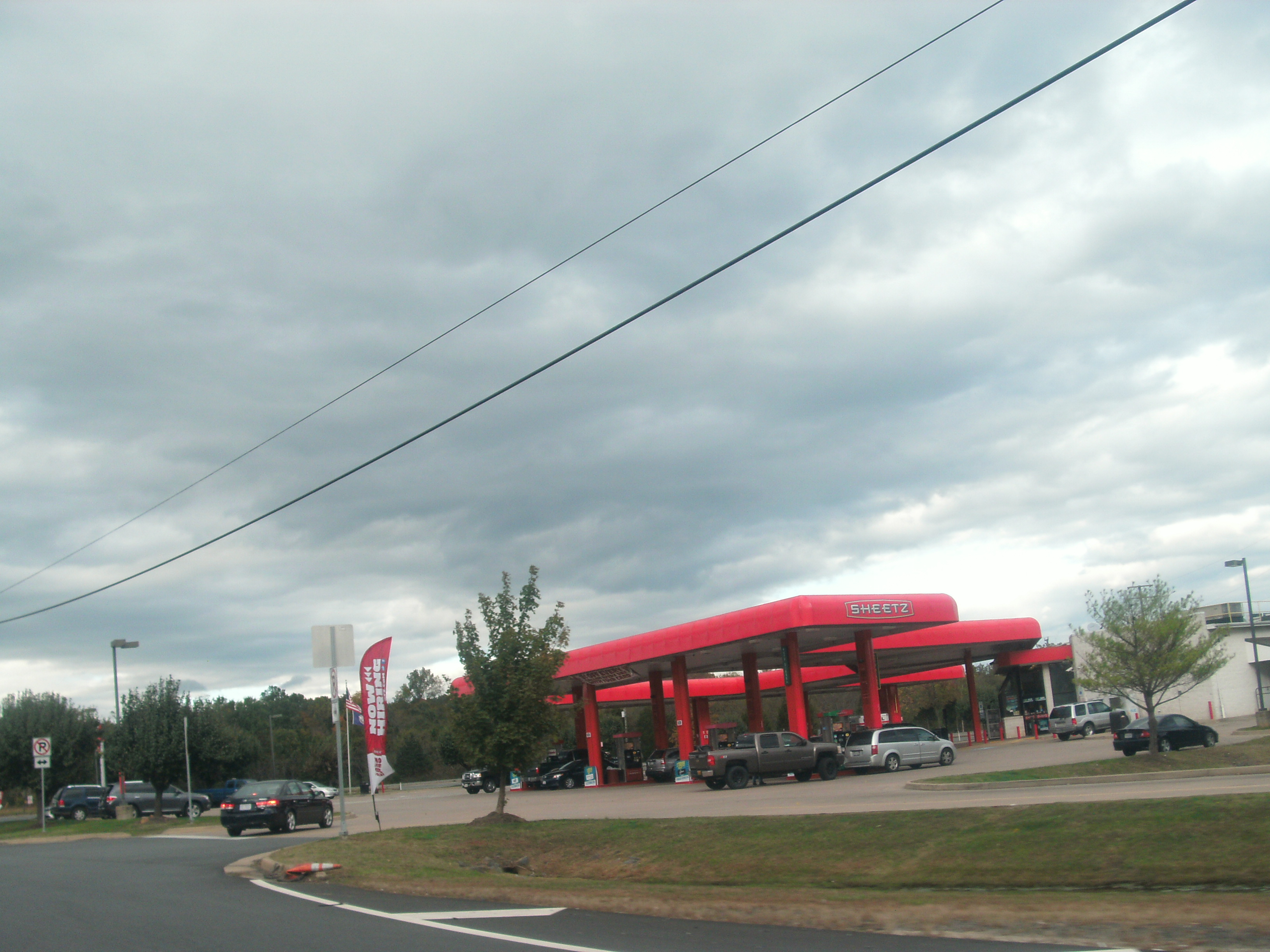
- Sheetz gas station in Opal

- Location within Northern Virginia Location within Virginia Location within the United States
- Coordinates: 38°37′15″N 77°48′00″W
- Country: United States
- State: Virginia
- County: Fauquier

Area
  - Total: 3.16 sq mi (8.19 km^{2})
  - Land: 3.14 sq mi (8.12 km^{2})
  - Water: 0.027 sq mi (0.07 km^{2})
- Elevation: 449 ft (137 m)

Population (2010)
  - Total: 691
  - Density: 220/sq mi (85.1/km^{2})
- Time zone: UTC−5 (Eastern (EST))
  - Summer (DST): UTC−4 (EDT)
- ZIP code: 20186
- FIPS code: 51-59416
- GNIS feature ID: 1499824

Opal (formerly Fayettesville) is an unincorporated community and census-designated place (CDP) in Fauquier County, Virginia, United States. It is on U.S. routes 15/17 and 29, at an elevation of 449 feet (137 m). As of the 2020 census, Opal had a population of 678.

== Geography ==
Opal is in western Fauquier County, 7 miles (11 km) south of Warrenton, the county seat, and 18 miles (29 km) northeast of Culpeper. US Route 17 diverges from Route 15 and 29 at Opal, leading southeast 31 miles (50 km) to Fredericksburg. Bealeton is directly south of Opal.

According to the U.S. Census Bureau, the Opal CDP has a total area of 3.2 square miles (8.2 km^{2}), of which 0.03 square miles (0.07 km^{2}), or 0.81%, is water. The northern and eastern sides of the community are part of the Potomac River watershed via Licking Run, Cedar Run, and the Occoquan River, while the western and southern sides are part of the Rappahannock River watershed, via Tinpot Run and Bowens Run.

== Demographics ==
Historical population
Census	Pop.	Note	%±
2010	691		—
2020	678		−1.9%
U.S. Decennial Census; 2010 2020

Opal was first listed as a census designated place in the 2010 U.S. census.

== History ==
Opal was chartered in 1798 as Fayettesville.
