= Brays Fork, Virginia =

Unincorporated community in Virginia, United States

- Unincorporated community
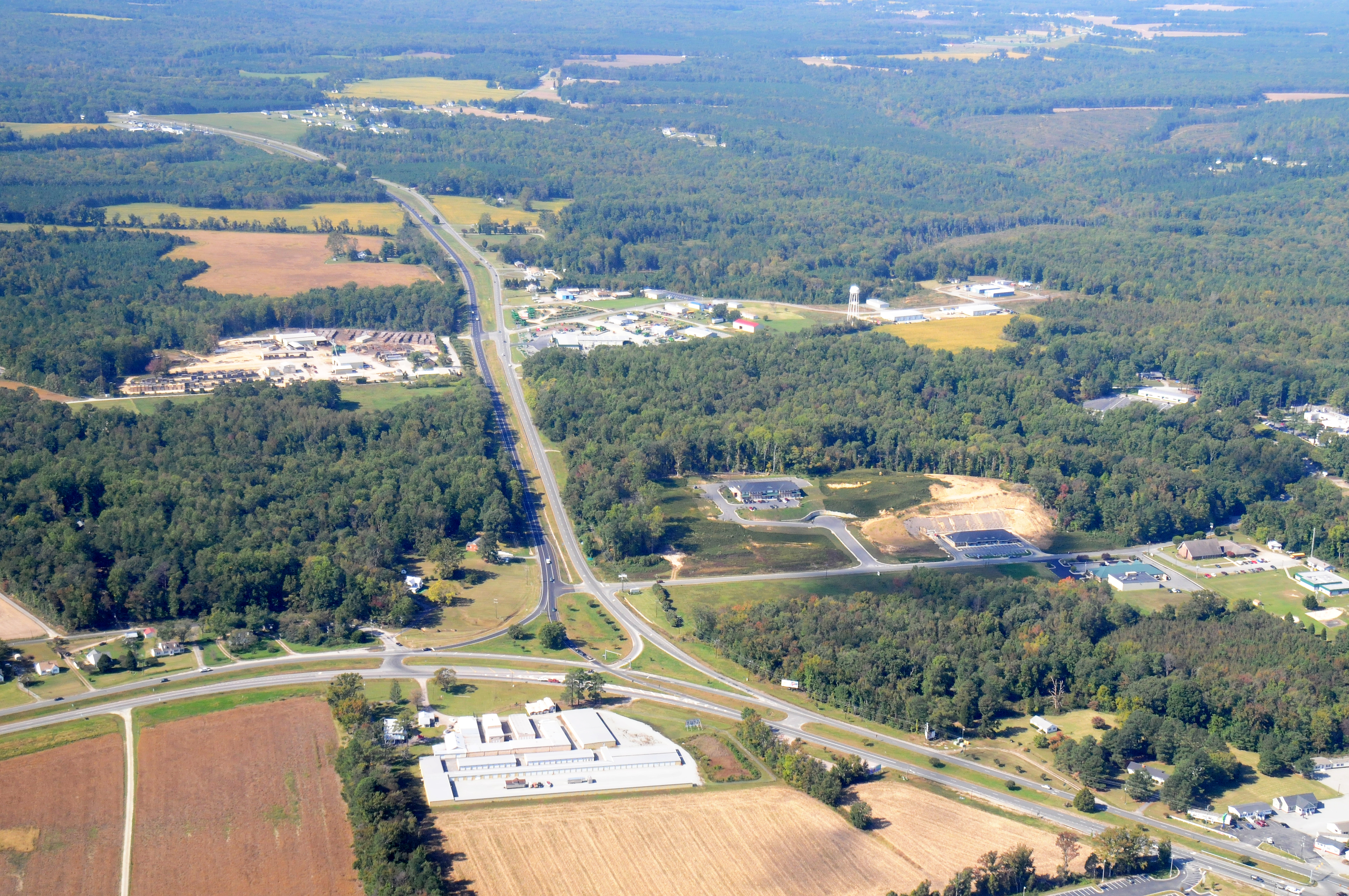
- Brays Fork looking west down Route 360 to Richmond

- Location within Virginia Location within the United States
- Coordinates: 37°54′01″N 76°52′01″W
- Country: United States
- State: Virginia
- County: Essex
- Elevation: 39 ft (12 m)
- Time zone: UTC-5 (Eastern (EST))
  - Summer (DST): UTC-4 (EDT)
- Area code: 804
- GNIS feature ID: 1493889

Brays Fork, also known as Brays, is an unincorporated community in Essex County, in the U.S. state of Virginia.
