= Shacklefords Fork, Virginia =

Unincorporated community in Virginia, United States

- Unincorporated community
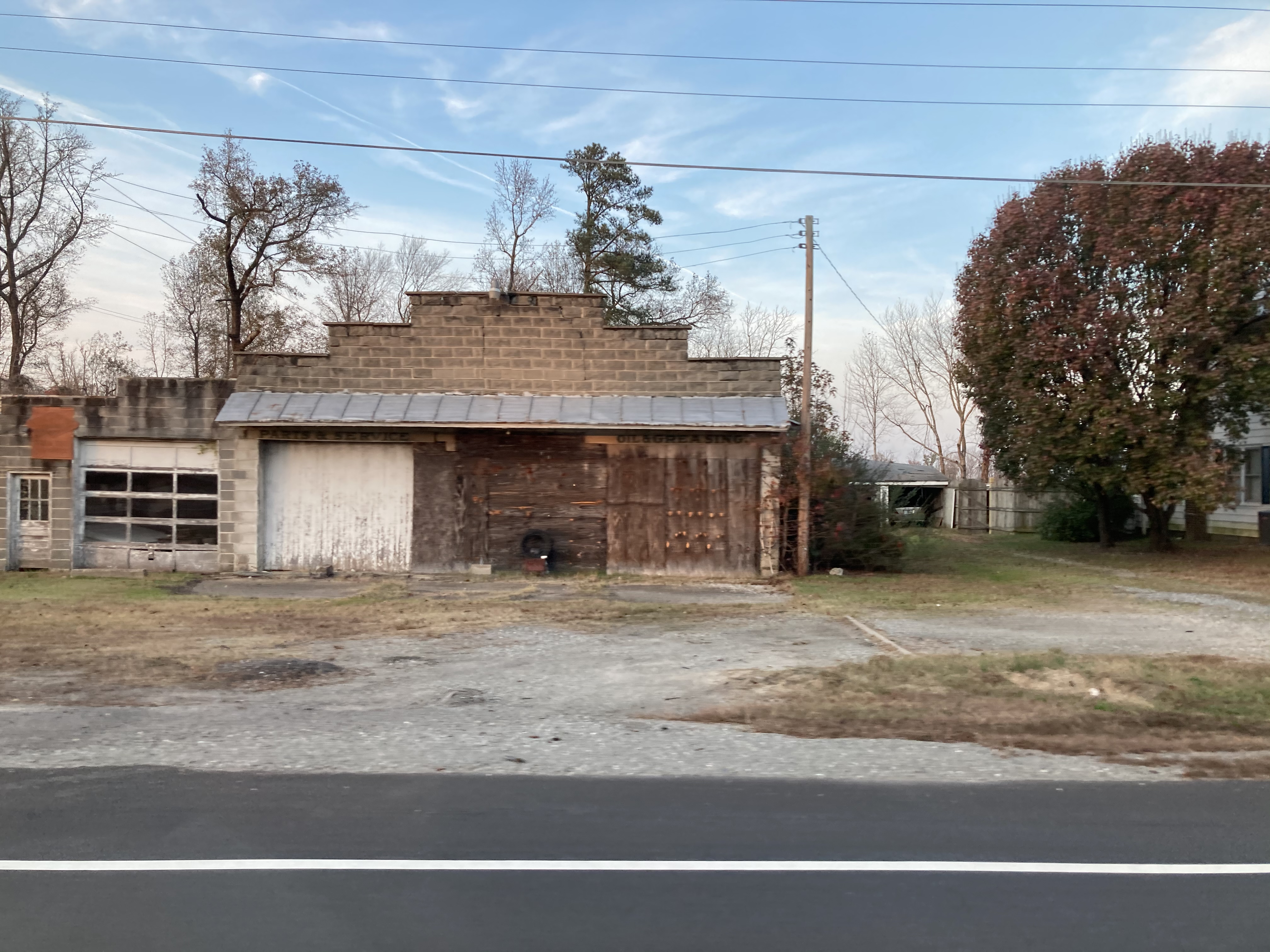

- Location within the Commonwealth of Virginia Shacklefords Fork (the United States)
- Coordinates: 37°32′39″N 76°42′13″W
- Country: United States
- State: Virginia
- County: King and Queen
- Time zone: UTC−5 (Eastern (EST))
  - Summer (DST): UTC−4 (EDT)

Shacklefords Fork is an unincorporated community in King and Queen County, Virginia, United States. The community takes its name from the Shackleford family of Shacklefords, Virginia, nearby in King and Queen County.
