= Fort Nonsense, Virginia =

Unincorporated community in Virginia, United States

- historical park
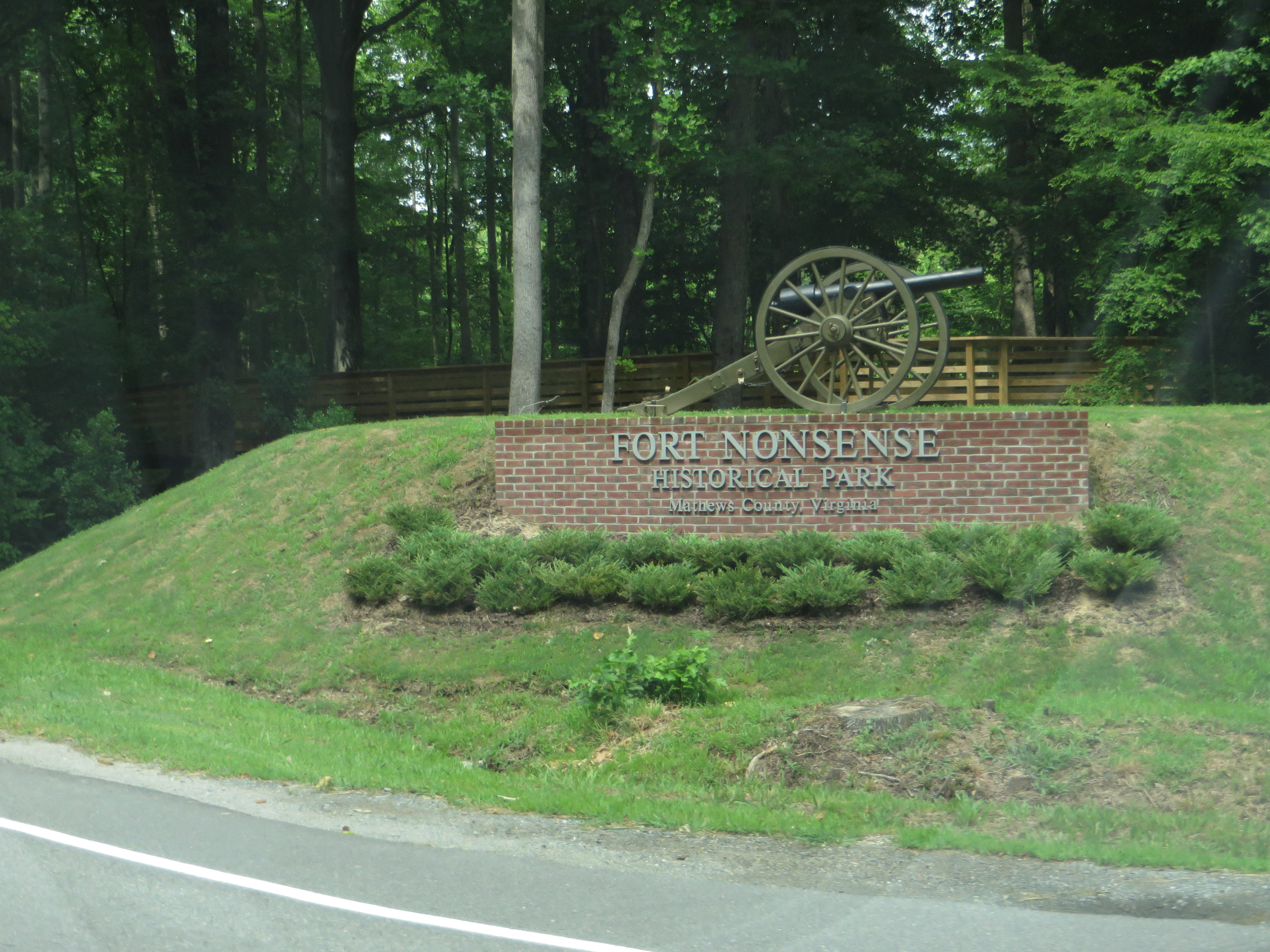
- Entrance to Fort Nonsense Historical Park

- Location within Virginia Location within the United States
- Coordinates: 37°27′54″N 76°26′42″W
- Country: United States
- State: Virginia
- County: Mathews
- Elevation: 13 ft (4.0 m)
- Time zone: UTC-5 (Eastern (EST))
  - Summer (DST): UTC-4 (EDT)
- Area code: 804
- GNIS feature ID: 1499440

Fort Nonsense is an historical park in Mathews County, Virginia, United States. Fort Nonsense is located at the junction of Virginia Route 3 and Virginia Route 14, around 5.5 miles (8.9 km) northeast of Gloucester. Historical markers on site state that it was built using slave labor by Confederate forces during the Civil War to help protect Richmond from the threat of Union forces landing from ships. However, Union forces that kept control of Gloucester, which is located southwest of the fort (so between Richmond and the fort), were the only troops to threaten the fort's area. Since Gloucester-based Union troops could attack the fort's rear and since the fort's defenses pointed in the wrong direction, the site came to be called locally "Fort Nonsense." The local historical society, the county, and the state's department of transportation share responsibility for the park —which has trails among traces of earthworks and some interpretive signage.
