= Fort Nonsense (Annapolis, Maryland) =

Coordinates: 38.9874°N 76.4698°W

- U.S. National Register of Historic Places
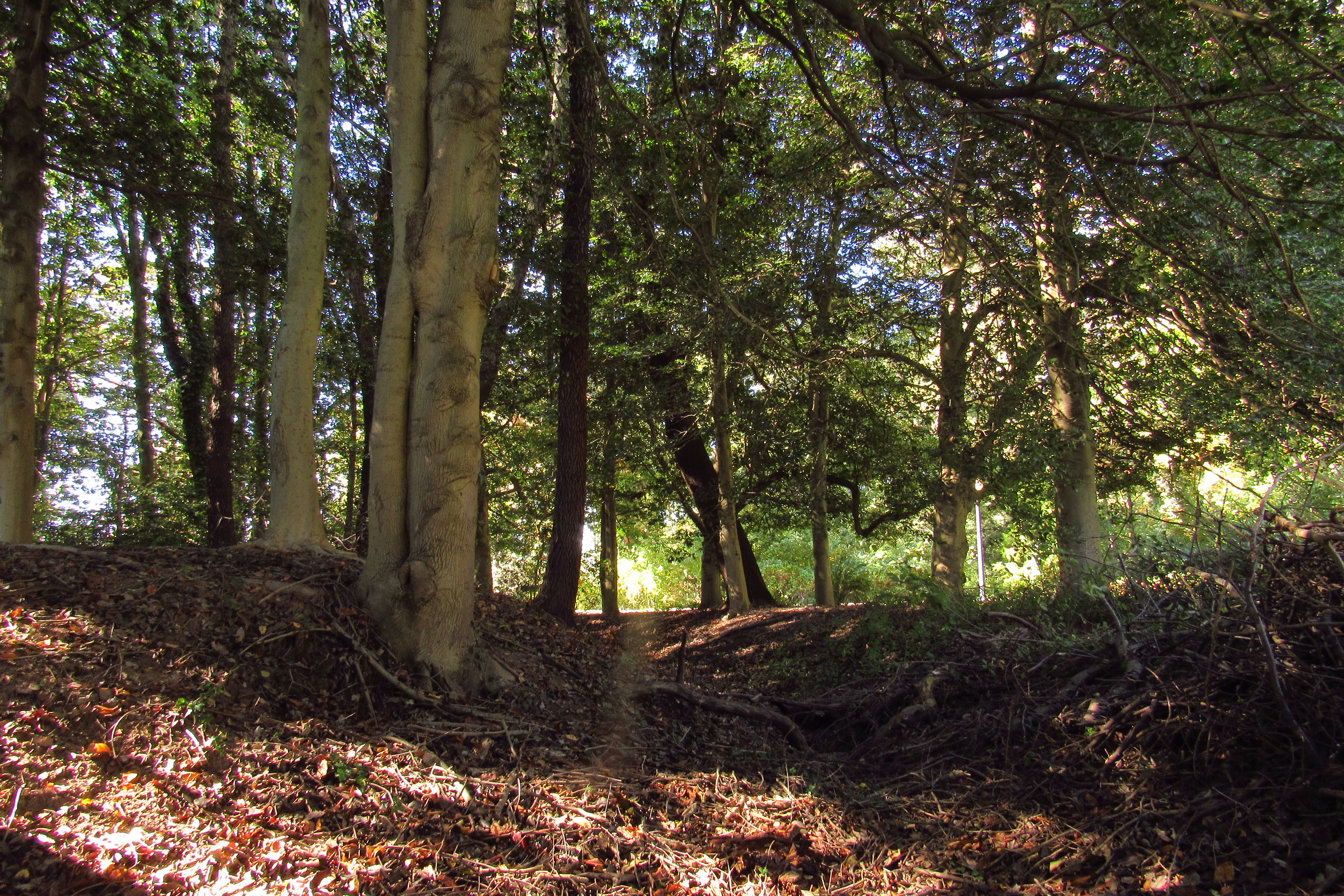
- Earthen embankments

- Location within Maryland Location within the United States
- Nearest city: Annapolis, Maryland
- NRHP reference No.: 84000408
- Added to NRHP: October 28, 1984

Fort Nonsense is a historic earthen fortification at Annapolis, Maryland. It consists of two arcs of embankments and ditches that date at least to the early 19th century. It is located near on a hilltop which has remained undisturbed by the surrounding Annapolis Naval Ship Research and Development Center. It is the last vestige of Annapolis Harbor fortifications.

It was listed on the National Register of Historic Places in 1984.

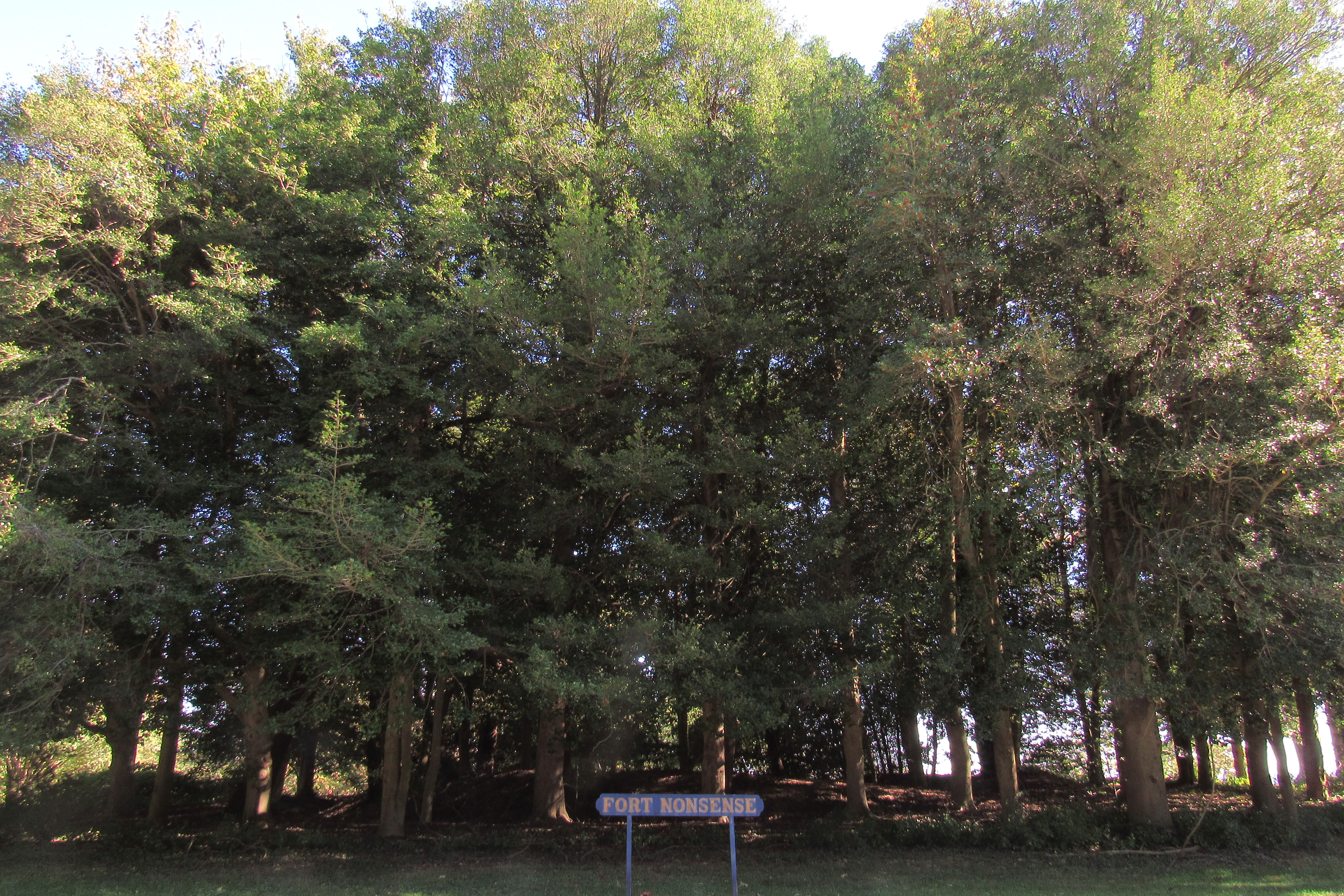
View from Church Rd

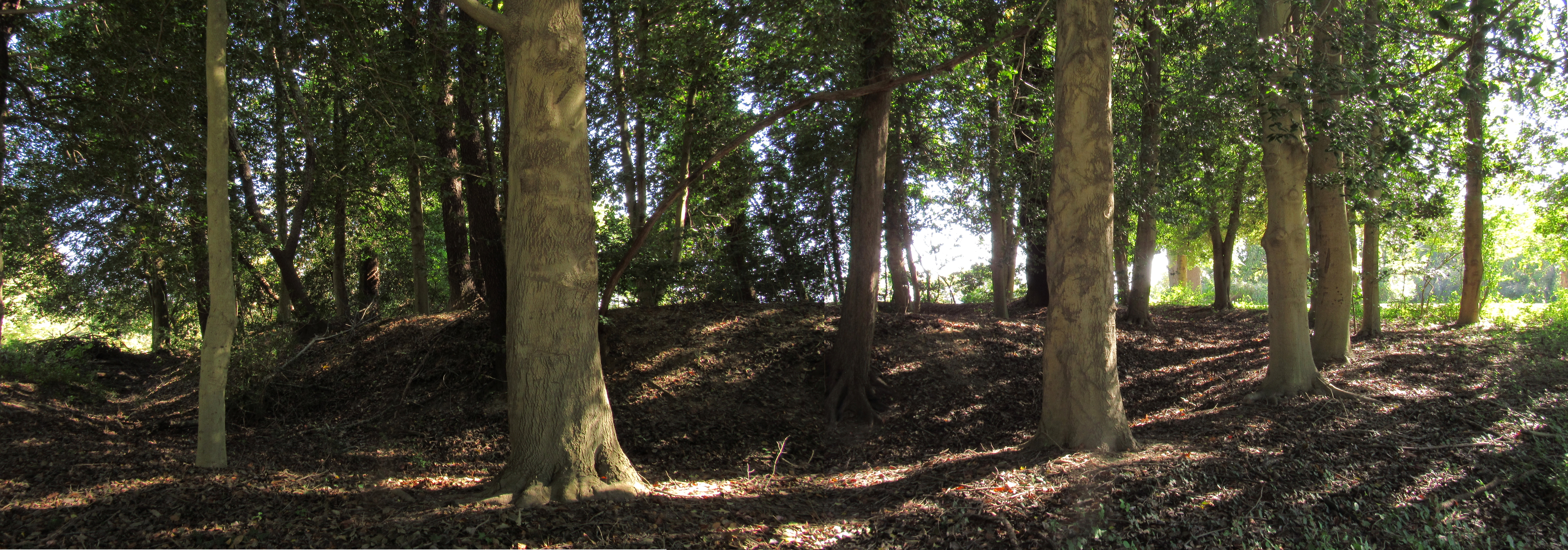
Panoramic view of Fort Nonsense
