= Blakes, Virginia =

Unincorporated community in Virginia, United States

- Unincorporated community
- Location within Virginia Location within the United States
- Coordinates: 37°29′57″N 76°22′03″W
- Country: United States
- State: Virginia
- County: Mathews
- Elevation: 20 ft (6.1 m)
- Time zone: UTC-5 (Eastern (EST))
  - Summer (DST): UTC-4 (EDT)
- Area code: 804
- GNIS feature ID: 1474227

Blakes is an unincorporated community in Mathews County, Virginia, United States. Blakes is located on Virginia Route 198, 5 miles (8.0 km) northwest of Mathews.

Hesse was listed on the National Register of Historic Places in 1974.
