= Moss Neck, Virginia =

Unincorporated community in Virginia, United States

Coordinates: 38°13′14″N 77°17′57″W

Moss Neck is an unincorporated community in Caroline County, in the U.S. state of Virginia.
