= Billups Branch =

Stream in the American states of Iowa and Missouri

Coordinates: 40.57229°N 92.14613°W

Billups Branch is a stream in the U.S. states of Iowa and Missouri. It is a tributary of the North Wyaconda River.

Billups Branch has the name of Joseph Billups, an early settler.

== See also ==
- List of rivers of Iowa
- List of rivers of Missouri
