= Henleys Fork, Virginia =

Unincorporated community in Virginia, United States

- Unincorporated community
- Location within the Commonwealth of Virginia Henleys Fork (the United States)
- Coordinates: 37°45′21″N 76°59′26″W
- Country: United States
- State: Virginia
- County: King and Queen
- Time zone: UTC−5 (Eastern (EST))
  - Summer (DST): UTC−4 (EDT)

Henleys Fork is an unincorporated community in King and Queen County, Virginia, United States.
