= Cobbs Creek, Virginia =

Unincorporated community in Virginia, United States

- Unincorporated community
- Location within Virginia Location within the United States
- Coordinates: 37°30′20″N 76°23′49″W
- Country: United States
- State: Virginia
- County: Mathews
- Elevation: 33 ft (10 m)
- Time zone: UTC-5 (Eastern (EST))
  - Summer (DST): UTC-4 (EDT)
- ZIP code: 23035
- Area code: 804
- GNIS feature ID: 1499279

Cobbs Creek is an unincorporated community in Mathews County, Virginia, United States. Cobbs Creek is located on Virginia Route 198, 6.5 miles (10.5 km) northwest of Mathews. Cobbs Creek has a post office with ZIP code 23035.
