= Pope B. Billups =

American politician

Pope Barrow Billups (October 11, 1889 – December 6, 1955) was an American lawyer and politician. He represented the 21st district in the New York State Assembly.

Pope Billups was born in Athens, Georgia, and graduated from the Florida Baptist Academy in 1910, and then attended Florida A&M University. He earned a Bachelor of Laws from New York University in 1916, and was admitted to the New York State Bar Association the year after. He was elected in 1925.

== See also ==
- List of African-American officeholders (1900–1959)

New York State Assembly
| Preceded by Henri W. Shields | New York State Assembly; New York County, 21st District; 1925 | Succeeded by Albert Grossman |
