= Rappahannock Community College =

Two-campus public college in Virginia, US

- Type: Public community college
- Established: 1970
- President: Shannon L. Kennedy
- Location: Glenns, Warsaw, Kilmarnock, King George, New Kent, Virginia, United States
- Campus: Glenns, Warsaw
- Nickname: Gulls
- Mascot: Squall (a seagull)
- Website: www.rappahannock.edu

Rappahannock Community College (RCC) is a public community college with two campuses in Virginia, one in Glenns (Gloucester County) and the other in Warsaw (Richmond County). There are three off-campus sites — one in Kilmarnock, one in King George, one in New Kent County. The institution is one of the twenty-three colleges in the Virginia Community College System. It mostly serves students living on the Middle Peninsula and the Northern Neck, but it also has students from other parts of Virginia. RCC offers associate degrees, certificates, career studies certificates, dual enrollment credit, non-credit programs, lifelong learning credits, and programs for incarcerated students.

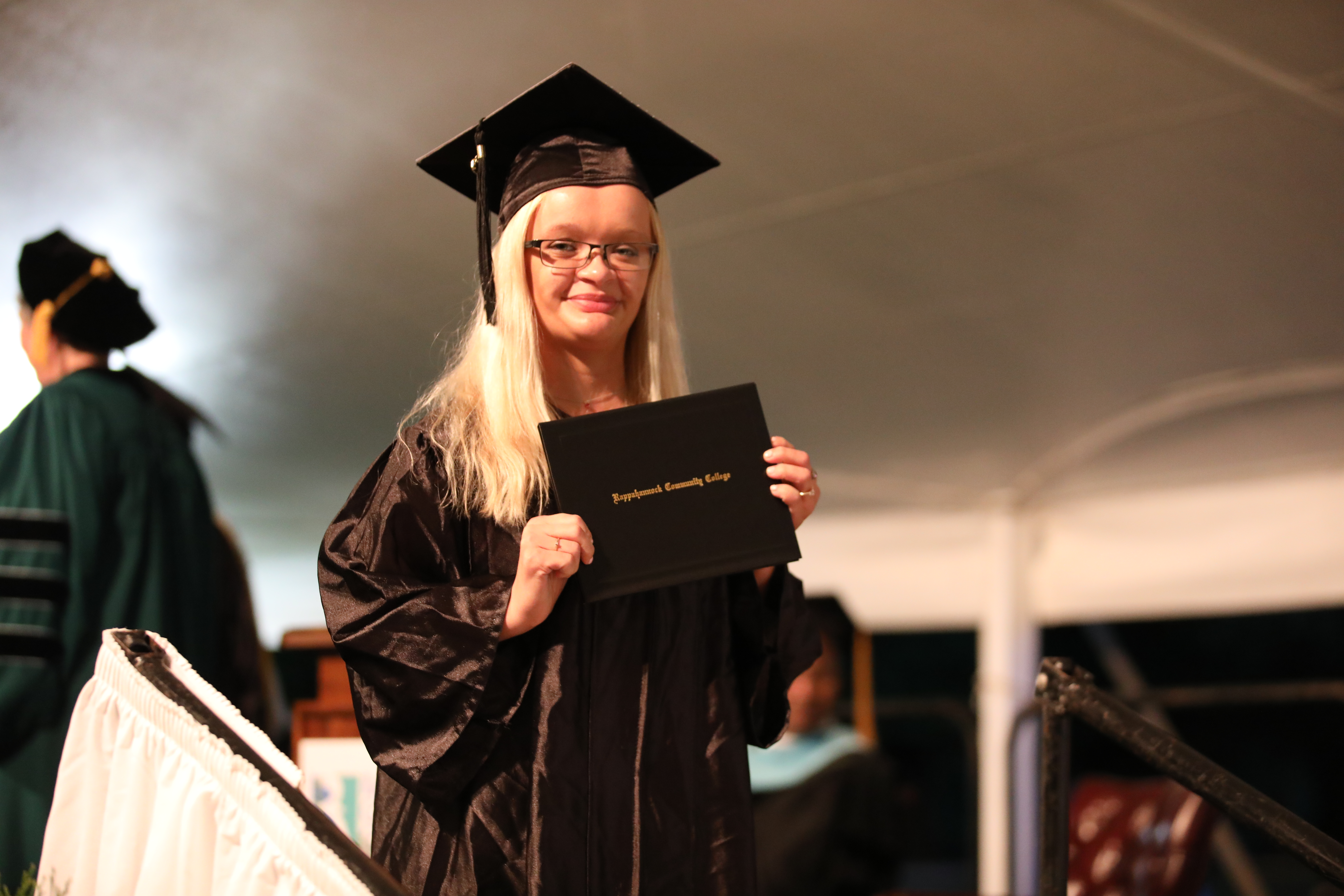
Commencement 2019 at RCC

== Service region ==
RCC serves the following 12 counties in the Northern Neck and Middle Peninsula regions: King George, Westmoreland, Richmond, Northumberland, Essex, Lancaster, King and Queen, Gloucester, Mathews, Middlesex, King William, and New Kent. The service region of RCC is roughly the size of the State of Delaware.

== Dual enrollment ==
RCC has Dual Enrollment agreements with most local high school systems to offer college-level courses that can be taken at the college or the high school location. Dual Enrollment courses enable students to take courses at RCC while enrolled in high school and provide college level educational opportunities.

== Workforce programs ==
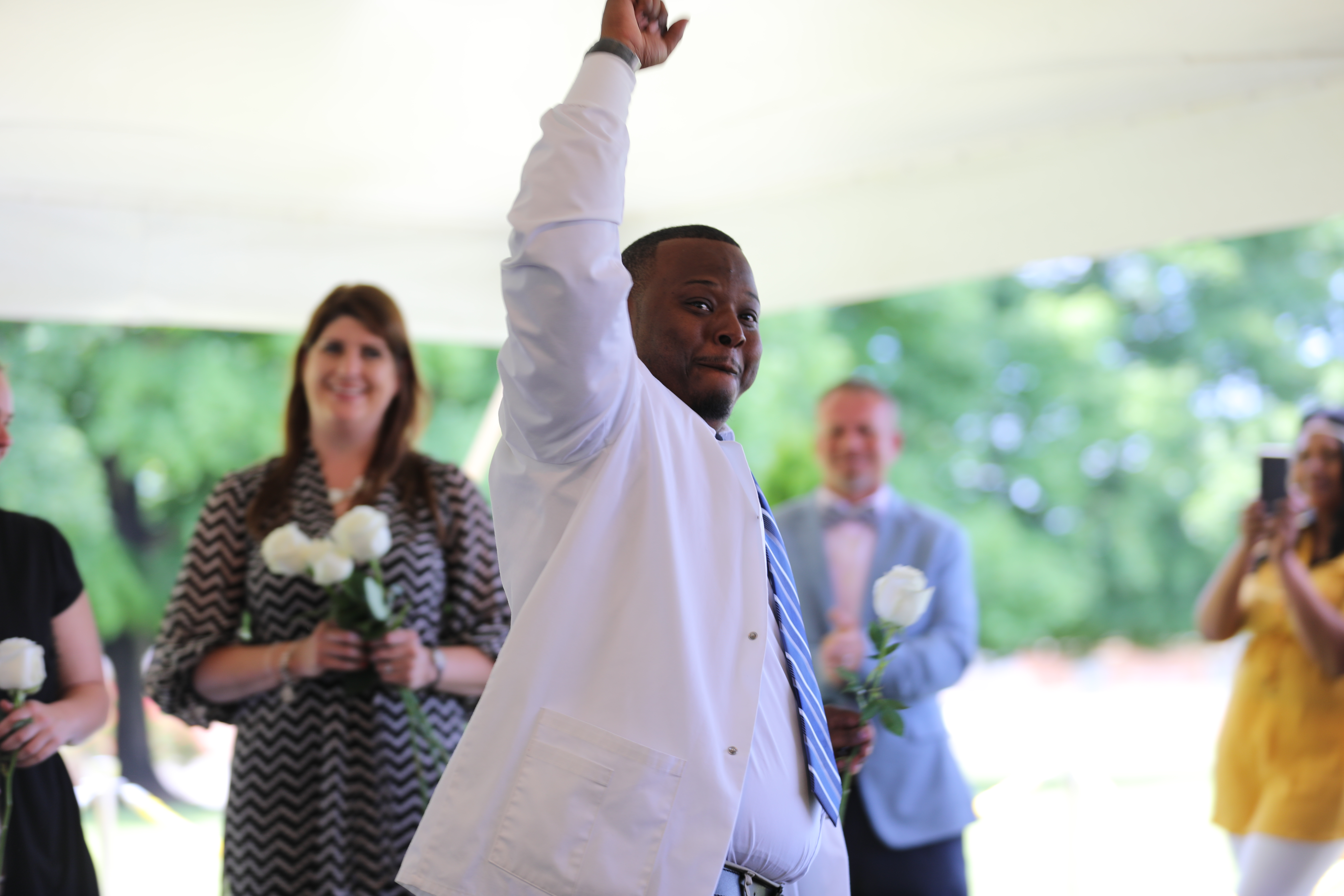
Nursing program pinning ceremony at Rappahannock Community College, 2019

RCC's Workforce and Community Development Center offers cost-effective, flexible, comprehensive and responsive programs designed around business, industry and education needs. The RCC Workforce course offerings fall into these categories:

- Agriculture, Food And Natural Resources
- Architecture And Construction
- Business & Professional Development
- Communication And Information Technology
- Health And Safety
- Personal Enrichment
- Transportation

== Leadership ==
Dr. Shannon L. Kennedy became the fourth president of Rappahannock Community College on July 1, 2019, succeeding Dr. Elizabeth Hinton Crowther.

== See also ==
- Former New Kent High School, home of the New Kent Site.
