= Haven Beach, Virginia =

Unincorporated community in Virginia, US

Coordinates: 37°25′34″N 76°15′23″W

Haven Beach is an unincorporated community in Mathews County, in the U. S. state of Virginia.
