= Adner, Virginia =

Unincorporated community in Virginia, United States

Coordinates: 37°29′56″N 76°38′00″W

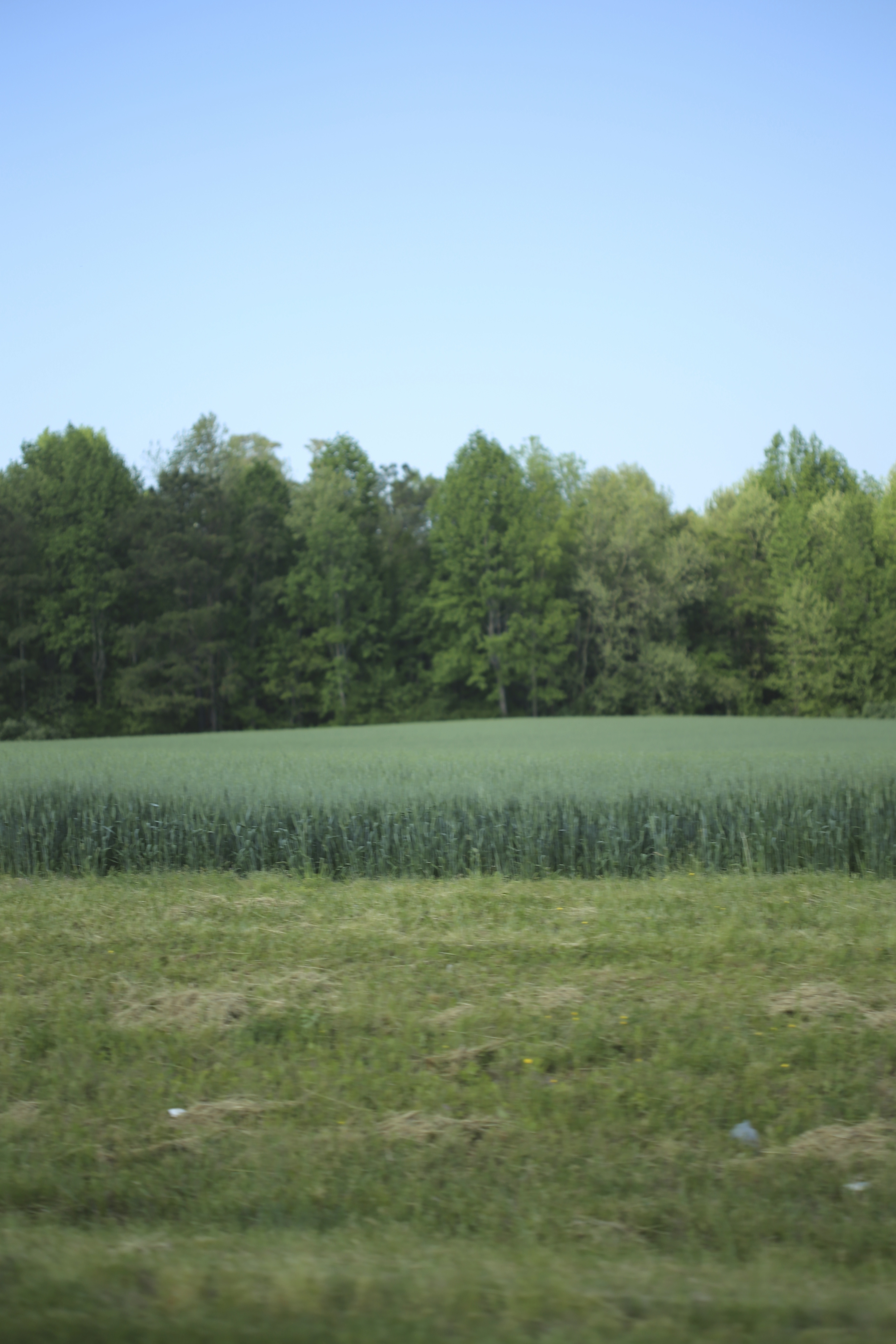

Adner is an unincorporated community in Gloucester County, in the U. S. state of Virginia.
