= Berea, Virginia =

Unincorporated community in Virginia, US

Coordinates: 38°21′43″N 77°31′11″W

Berea is an unincorporated community in Stafford County, in the U.S. state of Virginia.
