= Moon, Virginia =

Unincorporated community in Virginia, United States

- Unincorporated community
- Location within Virginia Location within the United States
- Coordinates: 37°26′36″N 76°17′34″W
- Country: United States
- State: Virginia
- County: Mathews
- Elevation: 10 ft (3.0 m)
- Time zone: UTC-5 (Eastern (EST))
  - Summer (DST): UTC-4 (EDT)
- ZIP code: 23119
- Area code: 804
- GNIS feature ID: 1470699

Moon is an unincorporated community in Mathews County, Virginia, United States. Moon is 1.5 miles (2.4 km) east-northeast of Mathews. Moon has a post office with ZIP code 23119.

The area got its name when local merchant, William Jefferson Callis, applied for a post office in his store. Callis requested "Jeff" as the name for his office, but the Post Office Department denied him the name. According to the records in the National Archives, Callis said the mail arrived about midday so he suggested the name "Noon" on his second request. However, his handwriting, not being too plain, a gentleman in the department read it as "Moon", and so Moon Post Office became official on December 8, 1902.

In April 2000, Moon Post Office was moved from Mr. Callis's store at 782 Fitchetts Wharf Rd., to a trailer at 184 Haven Beach Rd, Moon, Virginia.
