= Diggs, Virginia =

Unincorporated community in Virginia, United States

Diggs is an unincorporated community in Mathews County, in the U. S. state of Virginia.
