= Norvell (name) =

Norvell is both a surname and a given name. Notable people with the name include:

== Given name ==
- Norvell Austin (born 1958), American wrestler
- Norvell P. Cobb (1824–1879), American Civil War officer
- Norvell Coots, American physician, hospital administrator and retired military officer
- Norvell L. Henley (1869–1923), American attorney and politician
- Norvell W. Page (1904–1961), American pulp fiction writer
- Norvell G. Ward (1912–2005), American naval officer

== Surname ==
- David L. Norvell (born 1935), American politician
- Hugh Norvell (1669–1719), Virginia planter, soldier and politician
- James R. Norvell (1902–1969), American jurist
- Jay Norvell (born 1963), American college football coach
- John Norvell (1789–1850), newspaper editor and one of the first U.S. senators from Michigan
- Lipscomb Norvell (1756–1843), American military officer
- Margaret Norvell (1860–1934), lighthouse keeper
- Mike Norvell (born 1981), American college football coach
- Patsy Norvell (1942–2013), American visual artist
- Scott Norvell, blogger
- Stevens Thompson Norvell (1835–1911), military officer
- Zach Norvell Jr. (born 1997), American basketball player
