= Piney Swamp, Virginia =

Historic African-American community in Virginia

Piney Swamp
- Historic African-American community (freedom colony)
- Country: United States
- State: Virginia
- County: Gloucester
- Settled: after the American Civil War

Piney Swamp is a historic African-American community in southern Gloucester County, Virginia, United States, established in the aftermath of the American Civil War by people who had been enslaved on the surrounding Tidewater plantations, including Fairfield Plantation. During the era of slavery the wooded, swampy terrain served as a place of refuge for enslaved people from Fairfield and other nearby plantations; after emancipation, freedpeople purchased parcels of land in the area — in some cases from their former enslavers — and built an independent community of farms, churches, and a school. Communities of this kind, founded and owned by formerly enslaved people across the post-emancipation South, are known as freedom colonies or freedmen's towns.

The community's history is closely intertwined with that of the Fairfield, Rosewell, and Timberneck plantations, and its documentation has been a focus of the Fairfield Foundation, a Gloucester County archaeological nonprofit, working in partnership with the descendant community and with the College of William & Mary's Lemon Project.

== Background ==
The land on which Piney Swamp developed lies within a landscape shaped by more than two centuries of plantation slavery. Fairfield Plantation was patented by Lewis Burwell I in 1648, and the Burwell family and their successors, including the Thruston family, held large numbers of enslaved Africans and African Americans there through the antebellum period. The Fairfield manor house, built in 1694 and regarded by architectural historians as among the most sophisticated houses of colonial British North America, burned in 1897; at the time of the fire its last known occupant was an African-American woman whose identity has not been recovered from the documentary record.

== Refuge and settlement ==
During the period of enslavement, the swampy woodland that gave Piney Swamp its name offered concealment and temporary refuge to enslaved people from Fairfield and other plantations in the area. Following emancipation, formerly enslaved families acquired land in the vicinity, purchasing parcels from former plantation owners as antebellum estates were broken up. According to the Fairfield Foundation, the acquisition of these parcels by African Americans created a thriving community between the areas of Clopton and Coke in southern Gloucester County.

== Community institutions ==
Church congregations anchored the community's religious and social life. The Fairfield Foundation records that Piney Swamp and neighboring African-American communities originally congregated at Providence Baptist Church, and later at First Baptist Church and the nearby Antioch Baptist Church. The historic Antioch Baptist Church, which stands across from the Fairfield Plantation site, remains a gathering place for the descendant community and hosts an annual Homecoming celebrating the legacy of the church and the Piney Swamp community.

Education was an early priority of the settlement: the community established the Piney Swamp School to serve its children in the generations after emancipation, part of the broader pattern by which freedpeople in Gloucester County built churches and schools for the next generation. Few written records produced by the community itself survive; its history is preserved largely through land records, church life, family memory, and oral tradition, and the African-American experience of places like Piney Swamp is significantly under-represented in traditional archives.

== Documentation and descendant community ==
The Fairfield Foundation, a Gloucester County archaeological nonprofit co-directed by the archaeologists David Brown and Thane Harpole, has conducted archaeological and archival research at Fairfield, Rosewell, and Timberneck, examining documents relating to the Burwell, Thruston, Page, and Catlett families as well as to the hundreds of enslaved and free African Americans who lived and worked on those properties, and building a database of oral histories describing the changing plantation landscape and the formation of African-American communities such as Piney Swamp after the Civil War.

The community's history has also featured in the programming of the Lemon Project at the College of William & Mary, whose 2025 symposium presented Piney Swamp as a site of refuge for the enslaved of Fairfield and other plantations and as a post-emancipation Black settlement. At the Antioch Baptist Church Homecoming, held annually in late June, the Fairfield Foundation and the Truth In The Spirit ministry (stewards of the historic church) present research on the Piney Swamp community, the enslaved communities of the surrounding plantations, and the history of the region's Black churches, alongside descendant-led oral-history documentation.

== See also ==
- Fairfield Plantation, Gloucester County, Virginia
- Rosewell (plantation)
- Werowocomoco
- Freedmen's town
- Thomas Calhoun Walker, Gloucester County educator and attorney born into slavery in 1862
- Irene Morgan, Gloucester County resident whose 1944 arrest led to Morgan v. Virginia
