= Fairfield Foundation =

Non-profit organisation based in Virginia, US

- Formation: 2000
- Founders: David Brown and Thane Harpole
- Type: 501(c)(3) nonprofit
- Purpose: Public archaeology, historic preservation, and education
- Headquarters: The Center for Archaeology, Preservation and Education (C.A.P.E.), 6783 Main Street, Gloucester Courthouse, Virginia
- Co-directors: David Brown and Thane Harpole
- Website: fairfieldfoundation.org

The Fairfield Foundation is an American 501(c)(3) nonprofit organization based in Gloucester County, Virginia, dedicated to involving the public in hands-on archaeology, historic preservation, and education on Virginia's Middle Peninsula. Founded in 2000 by the archaeologists David Brown and Thane Harpole to conduct the long-term archaeological investigation of Fairfield Plantation — the seventeenth- and eighteenth-century seat of the Burwell family — the foundation has grown into the principal archaeological research and preservation organization of the Middle Peninsula, operating five historic properties in Gloucester County: Fairfield Archaeology Park, the Timberneck House at Machicomoco State Park, the restored Edge Hill Texaco station (its headquarters, the C.A.P.E.), the Rosewell Ruins and Visitor Center, and the birthplace of Walter Reed.

The foundation's work spans excavation and preservation of colonial plantation sites, the documentation of the enslaved and free African-American communities of the region — including the post-emancipation Piney Swamp freedom colony — and public education programs that have engaged thousands of schoolchildren and volunteers. It is recognized by the federal Advisory Council on Historic Preservation as a Preserve America Steward.

== History ==
Brown and Harpole began researching Fairfield in the 1990s as students at the College of William & Mary, and established the Fairfield Foundation in 2000 to undertake sustained archaeological excavation and public outreach at the plantation site. A descendant of the Burwell family, the plantation's historic owners, subsequently willed the Fairfield property to the foundation. From its original focus the organization expanded into school programs, public archaeology across the community, workshops, summer camps, and an internship program that has hosted roughly two hundred interns and fellows. In November 2021 the foundation received a grant under the National Endowment for the Humanities' Sustaining the Humanities through the American Rescue Plan program.

== Fairfield Plantation archaeology ==
Fairfield Plantation was part of a 2,350-acre tract patented by Lewis Burwell I in 1648 near the head of Carters Creek; its brick manor house, built in 1694 and regarded as among the most sophisticated houses of colonial British North America, burned in 1897, and the property is listed on the National Register of Historic Places and as a Virginia Historic Landmark. The foundation's excavations, conducted since 2000 with students, interns, and volunteers, have examined the manor complex and the plantation landscape of Gloucester County's "Golden Age" of 1675–1725; a protective structure was planned over the manor ruins in the early 2020s to preserve them while keeping the site open for research and visitors.

Alongside the architectural record, the foundation's archival and archaeological research documents the hundreds of enslaved and free African Americans who lived and worked at Fairfield, Rosewell, and Timberneck, drawing on documents relating to the Burwell, Thruston, Page, and Catlett families and building a database of oral histories that describe the transformation of the plantation landscape and the formation of African-American communities such as Piney Swamp after the American Civil War. This descendant-community engagement includes the annual Homecoming at the historic Antioch Baptist Church, presented with the church's stewards, and the 2024–2025 exhibition Everyday People: Through Freedom's Lens, curated with members of Gloucester's Black descendant community at the Fine Arts Museum of Gloucester and featuring the civil-rights-era photographs of Freedom B. Goode. The foundation's research on Piney Swamp and the enslaved communities of Fairfield has also featured in the programming of the Lemon Project at William & Mary.

== The C.A.P.E. ==
In 2010 the foundation purchased the 1930 Edge Hill Service Station — a Denver-type Texaco station on Main Street in Gloucester Courthouse — and restored it as its headquarters, the Center for Archaeology, Preservation and Education (C.A.P.E.). The restoration, completed at a cost of about $1.3 million with support from local foundations, contractors, and a transportation enhancement grant administered by Gloucester County, drew on the station's original blueprints and promotional materials located in the Texaco corporate archives held by Chevron; the restored building, crowned by its lighted Texaco sign and fitted with rooftop solar panels, opened in 2018 and houses the foundation's offices, laboratory, reference library, and visitor center at 6783 Main Street. The building hosts public archaeology "lab nights" and regular tours.

== Other properties and projects ==
The foundation is restoring the Timberneck House (c. 1793), within Machicomoco State Park, as a center for learning and lodging, with exhibits on the history and persistence of Virginia Indians, the history of Timberneck farm, and the historic sites of the region; its preservation programming at the property has included hands-on masonry workshops, and its research there includes documentation of the Catlett family cemetery. The foundation also operates the Rosewell Ruins and Visitor Center, where it conducts ongoing brick-and-mortar stabilization of the eighteenth-century Page family mansion ruins, and the birthplace of the Army physician Walter Reed at Belroi.

In regional preservation work, the foundation collaborated with the National Park Service in efforts that helped make Werowocomoco — the principal town of Chief Powhatan and one of the most significant archaeological sites in North America — part of the Captain John Smith Chesapeake National Historic Trail, and it documents historic buildings across the Middle Peninsula, including through drone photography and a site-protection initiative with the Archaeological Conservancy.

== Education and public programs ==
Public participation is central to the foundation's model: its founders report having worked with thousands of schoolchildren and hundreds of interns, volunteers, and workshop participants, who together have contributed some 86,000 volunteer hours at the Fairfield site. Since 2011 the foundation has partnered with the heritage-volunteering organization Adventures in Preservation on the Edge Hill station restoration and, from 2013, on preservation work at the Fairfield manor house. The foundation works with regional partners including the Gloucester Historical Society, the Rosewell Foundation, the Middle Peninsula chapter of the Archeological Society of Virginia, and other historical societies of the Middle Peninsula.

== See also ==
- Fairfield Plantation, Gloucester County, Virginia
- Piney Swamp, Virginia
- Rosewell (plantation)
- Machicomoco State Park
- Werowocomoco
