= Lewis Burwell (colonist) =

American planter and politician

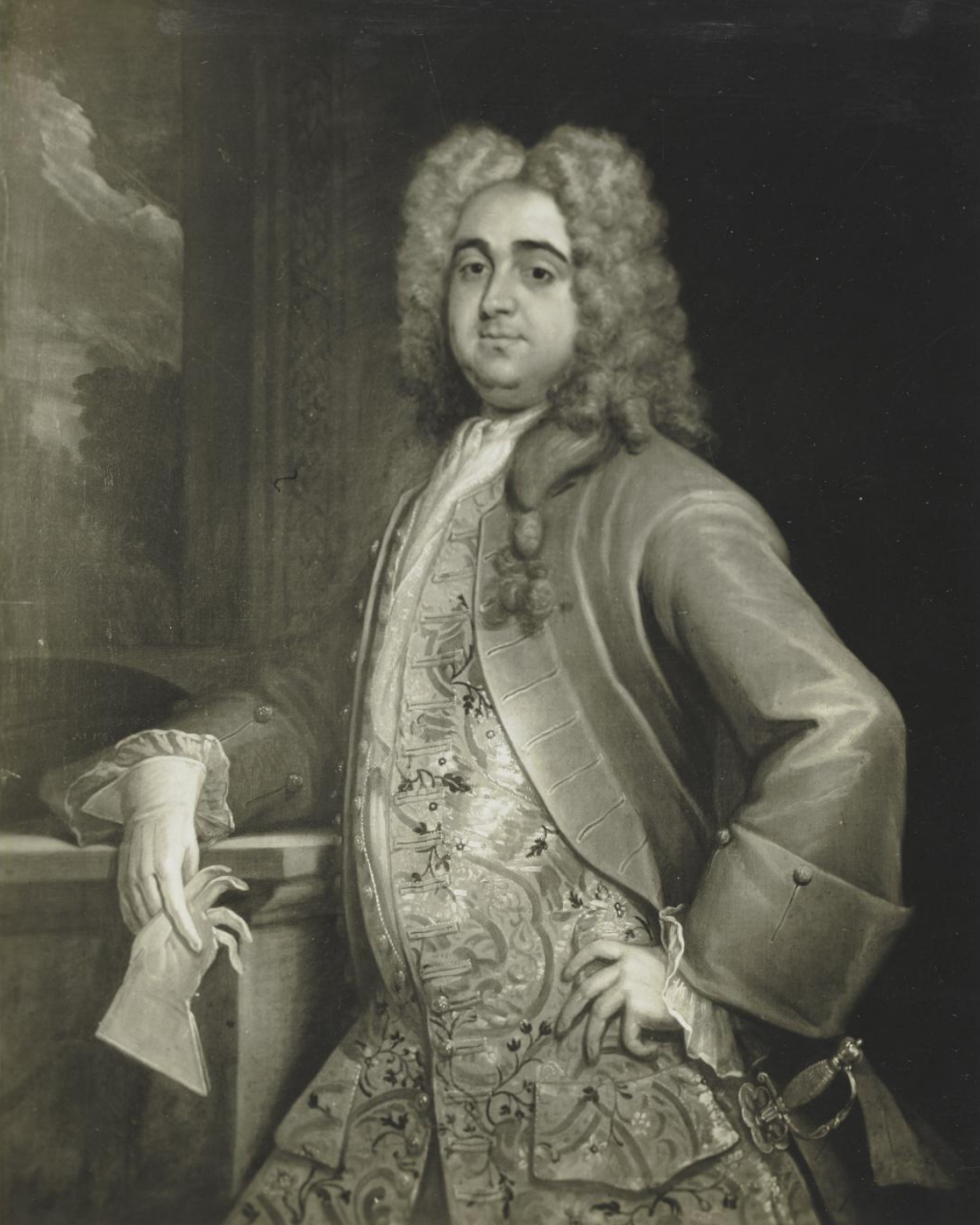
- c. 1736–1750 portrait

Royal Governor of Virginia
- Acting; November 14, 1750 – November 21, 1751
- Monarch: George II
- Governor: Willem van Keppel, 2nd Earl of Albemarle
- Preceded by: Thomas Lee
- Succeeded by: Robert Dinwiddie

Personal details
- Born: 1711 or 1712 Fairfield Plantation (Gloucester County, Virginia)
- Died: May 6, 1756 (aged 44-45) Fairfield Plantation (Gloucester County, Virginia)
- Spouse: Mary Willis (m. 1736, d. 1746)
- Children: 5-6; Lewis (d. 1799)
- Parent(s): Nathaniel Burwell; Elizabeth Burwell (nee Carter)
- Relatives: See Burwell family
- Education: Eton College, Gonville and Caius College (no degree)

Lewis Burwell (1711/1712 – May 6, 1756) was an American planter and politician who served as a member of the Virginia Governor's Council and as acting Governor of Virginia.

== Early life and education ==
Burwell was born in either 1711 or 1712 at Fairfield, the plantation of his parents, Elizabeth Carter Burwell and her first husband, Nathaniel Burwell.

In accordance with his father's will, Burwell's guardian, Robert "King" Carter I, sent him to England to be educated. From 1722 to 1729 he attended Eton College, and upon the age of seventeen he matriculated at Gonville and Caius College of Cambridge University. Burwell would remain there for four years. He did not receive a degree (which was not considered unusual at the time) but he may have perhaps studied law in London at the Inner Temple in February 1733, just a few months before he returned to Virginia after receiving news of the death of King Carter.

== Career ==
Lieutenant Governor Sir William Gooch noticed that Burwell returned to Virginia with a reticent and pretentious manner that curried disfavor among his fellow colonists. Nevertheless, in 1742 Burwell was elected to the House of Burgesses from Gloucester County and named to the Committees of Privileges and Elections and of Propositions and Grievances.

After serving in the short session that met from May 6 to June 19, he joined the upper echelons of Virginia leadership. On February 10, 1743, King George II appointed Burwell to the Governor's Council. He took his seat on August 4, 1743, and remained a councillor until his death in 1756.

Upon the death of Thomas Lee on November 14, 1750, Burwell became the senior member of the council. Because the governor and lieutenant governor were both out of Virginia at the time, he served as president, effectively making him acting Governor of Virginia, until the arrival of Lieutenant Governor Robert Dinwiddie on November 21, 1751.

Fry-Jefferson map

Although the General Assembly never convened during Burwell's administration, he continued Gooch's efforts to maintain peace with the Indians in the Ohio Valley, and he selected Joshua Fry and Peter Jefferson to draft a new map of Virginia. Regarding the now famous Fry-Jefferson map, Burwell remarked of Fry that “considering that we are yet a Country of Woods, it is surprising how he could draw so beautiful a Map of it.”

== Personal life ==
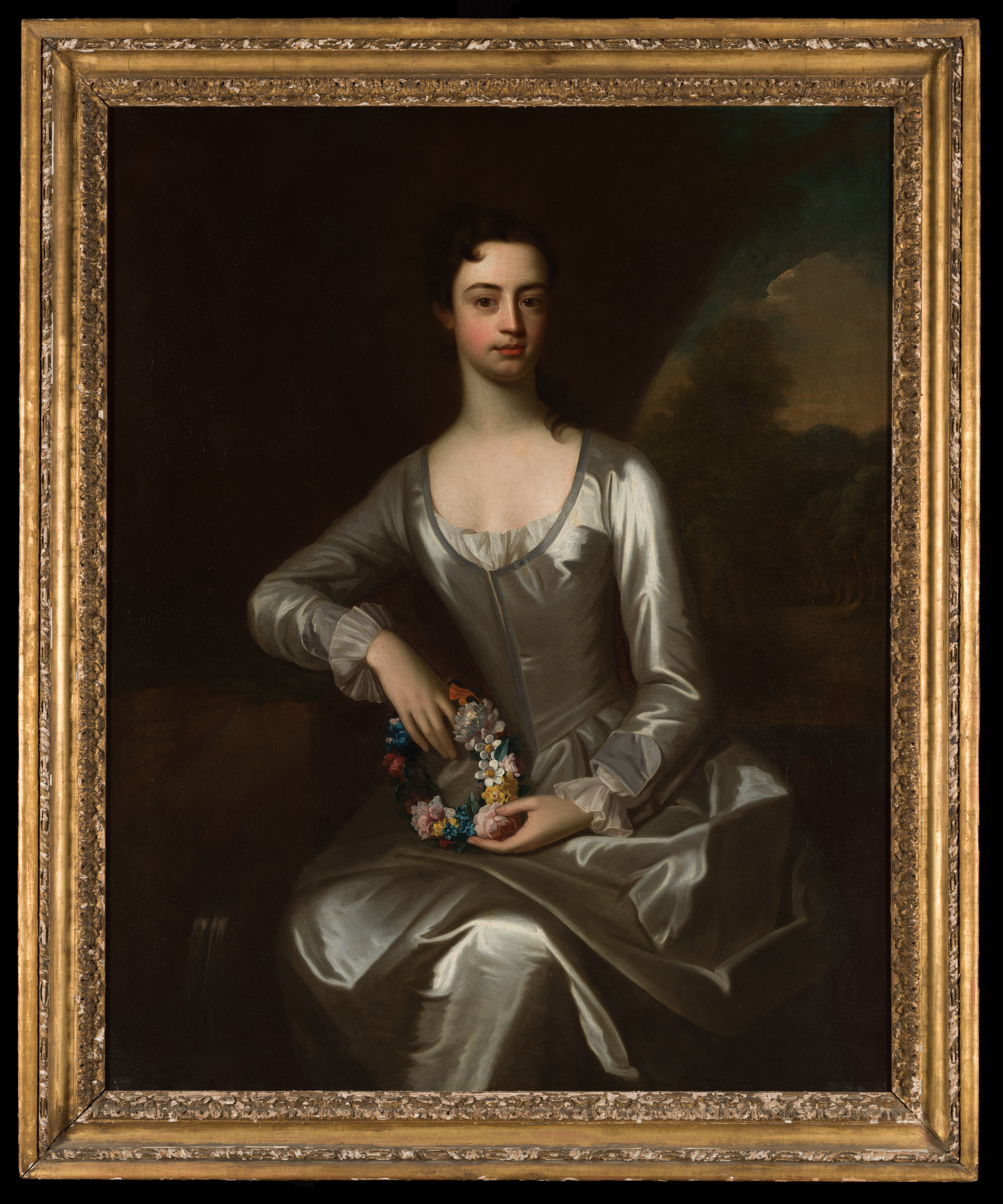
Mary Willis Burwell

Burwell had inherited a large amount of property from both sides of his family. A successive series of lawsuits to settle inheritance rights to property in England and Virginia eventually made him one of the wealthiest young men in Virginia. Fairfield burned in 1897, a fate shared by many Burwell family properties across the years.

Burwell continued to study law for a time after he returned to Virginia but there is no evidence he ever practiced. In October 1736 he married Mary Willis. They had two or three sons as well as three daughters before her death in May 1746. His eldest son, Lewis Burwell, served in the Fifth Virginia Convention.

== Illness and death ==
In the spring of 1751 Burwell's poor health led him to visit one of the medicinal springs in western Virginia. On several occasions, the Council met at Fairfield, ostensibly because of his inability to travel to Williamsburg.

Burwell never attended the Council again after Dinwiddle took office. The lieutenant governor wanted to replace him with a member who could take part, but was precluded from acting on this due to the Burwells being so well connected among the First Families.

Dinwiddie identified the cause of Burwell's malady as “a distemper in the Mind,” which possibly resulted from a cancer or tumor.

A nineteenth-century writer asserted that Burwell had injured his head in a fall from his horse during his time in England and that the lingering effects led to his poor health and death. Lewis Burwell died at Fairfield on May 6, 1756, and was likely interred in the family cemetery there. His remains were later relocated along with those of other family members to the graveyard of Abingdon Church.
