= Rosewell (plantation) =

Archaeological site in Virginia, United States

- U.S. National Register of Historic Places
- Virginia Landmarks Register
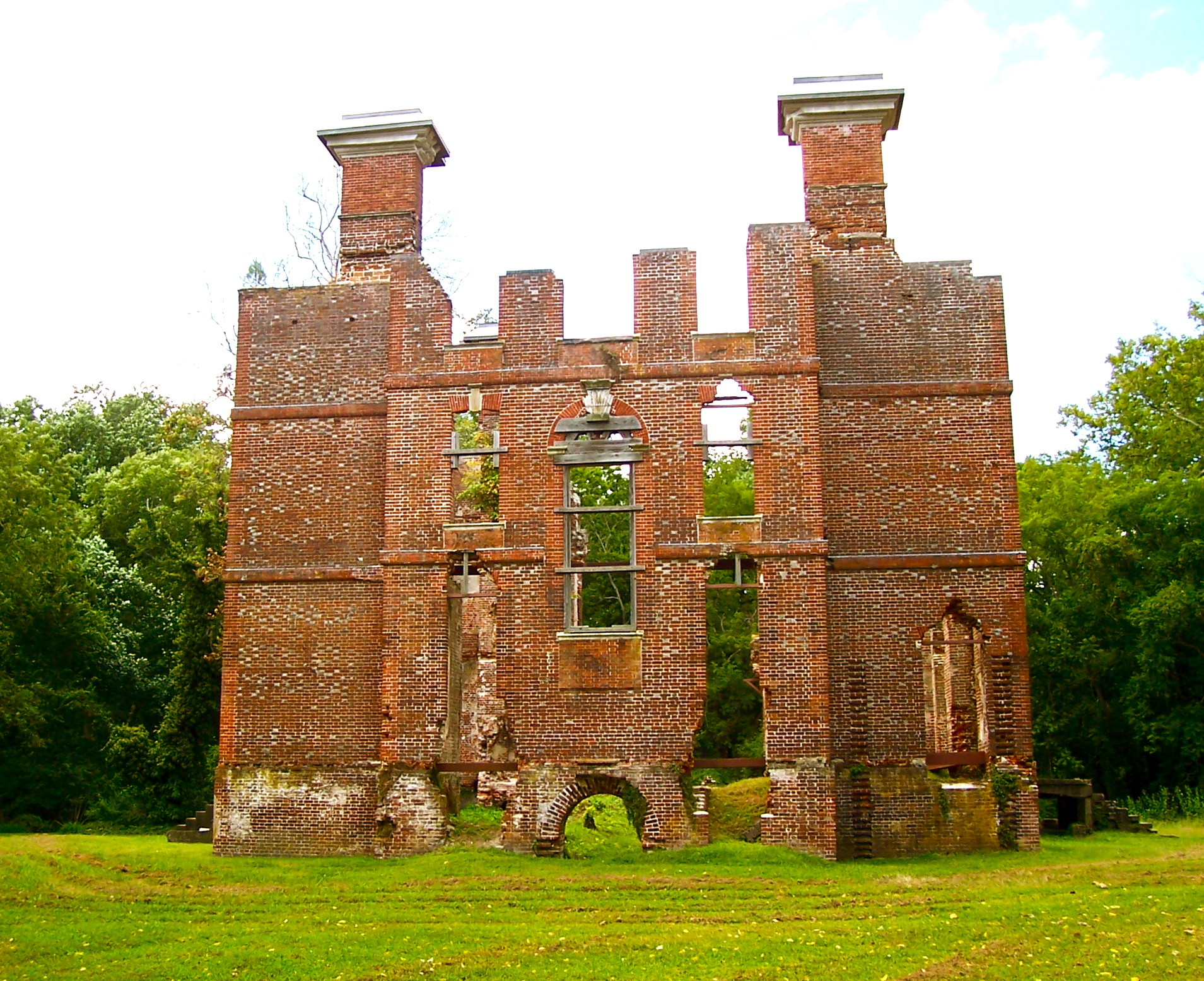
- Ruins of Rosewell.

- Location within Virginia Location within the United States
- Location: Rosewell, HABS Photo
- Coordinates: 37°19′40″N 76°34′35″W
- Area: 9.9 acres (4.0 ha)
- Built: 1725
- NRHP reference No.: 69000244
- VLR No.: 036-0041

Significant dates
- Added to NRHP: October 1, 1969
- Designated VLR: November 5, 1968

Rosewell Plantation in Gloucester County, Virginia, was for more than 100 years the home of a branch of the Page family, one of the First Families of Virginia. Begun in 1725, the Flemish bond brick Rosewell mansion overlooking the York River was one of the most elaborate homes in the American colonies.

In Mansions of Virginia, architectural historian Thomas Tileston Waterman describes the plantation house as "the largest and finest of American houses of the colonial period." Through much of the 18th century and 19th centuries, and during the American Civil War, Rosewell plantation hosted the area's most elaborate formal balls and celebrations. The home burned in 1916.

In 1793, the Page family sold part of the Rosewell plantation to the Catlett family, who erected a house called "Timberneck", which still stands inside Virginia's 40th state park, Machicomoco State Park. The Timberneck house, like Rosewell, has been the subject of archeological excavations, but unlike Rosewell, is being renovated by the Fairfield Foundation and volunteers, pursuant to an agreement with the Commonwealth of Virginia which envisions future lodging opportunities within the historic structure.

== History ==
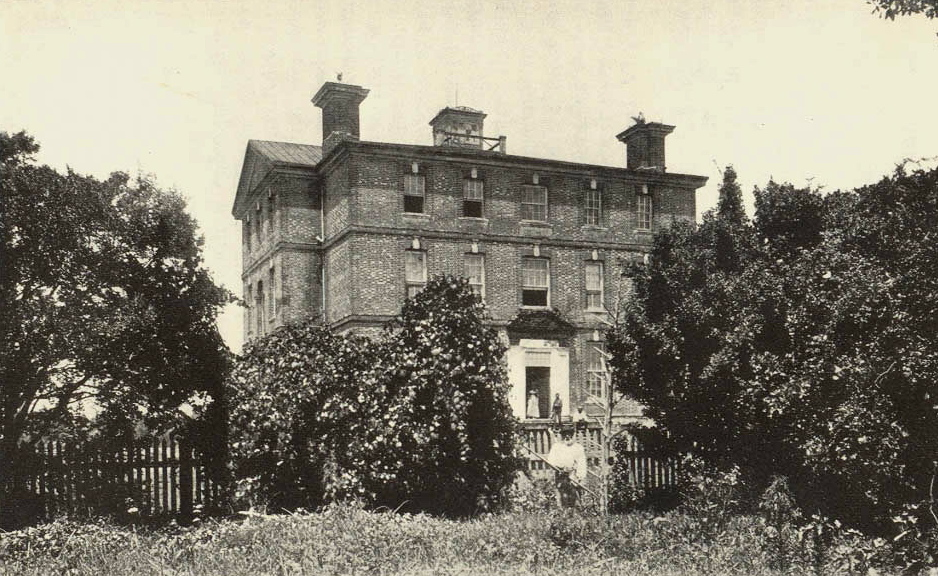
Rosewell at some point before 1916

Construction of Rosewell was begun in 1725 by Mann Page I (1691–1730), son of Matthew Page and Mary Mann and grandson of planter Colonel John Page of Jamestown and Middle Plantation. Page was educated in England at Eton College and Oxford University. Shortly after his return to North America, Page was appointed to the Governor's Council of the Virginia Colony. He married about 1712. His first wife died in 1716 from complications following the birth of their third child, son Mann Page, who also died.

In 1718 Page had married Judith Carter (1695–1750), a daughter of Robert "King" Carter and his first wife Judith Armistead. They had five children together, including a son named Mann Page II (1718-1778) and an infant that died in 1728, at birth.

Page had intended to build a mansion to rival or exceed in size and luxury the newly completed Governor's Palace in Williamsburg. After he died in 1730, his widow Judith Page inherited the property. The primary construction materials were brick, marble, and mahogany, some of which was imported from England. Architectural historians believe that the 12,000-square-foot (1,100 m^{2}) house, double the size of the Governor's Palace, may have been designed by Mann Page himself. Larger than any residence built in colonial Virginia, Rosewell probably owed its design to the London townhouses built to the stricter codes following the Great Fire of London.

Their son Mann Page II (1718-1778) supervised completion of the mansion after reaching manhood. By then the Page family was strapped for cash due to the cost of building the great house, and Page II ultimately sold off a significant portion of his vast land holdings to fund its completion. Page descendants continued to hold and occupy Rosewell for 100 years.

In 1837 the Page family sold the mansion to Thomas Booth. He made changes, removing the parapet and two octagonal rooftop cupolas from the house. The lead roof was stripped off and sold, as were the mansion's carved marble mantles and much of its fine interior woodwork. The flat roof was replaced with a low hip roof with a single cupola surrounded by a widow's walk.

The plantation passed through several more owners. In 1916 a fire broke out and destroyed Rosewell mansion. Today, the remains of the house is a largely undisturbed historic ruin. The site has been the subject of archaeological work. This has revealed many artifacts and shed light on some aspects of colonial life and architecture that were previously unclear. The property was listed in 1969 on the National Register of Historic Places.

From the colonial period to the Civil War, Rosewell planters held slaves to work as field hands and as house servants: valets and personal maids, cooks and housemaids. Such large plantations were essentially self-sufficient, so numerous slaves also performed skilled trades such as carriage driver and caring for horses and carriages, blacksmithing, woodworking, and butchering at the plantation. They raised all the vegetables and produce for the owners and often some for themselves.

=== Page family of Virginia ===
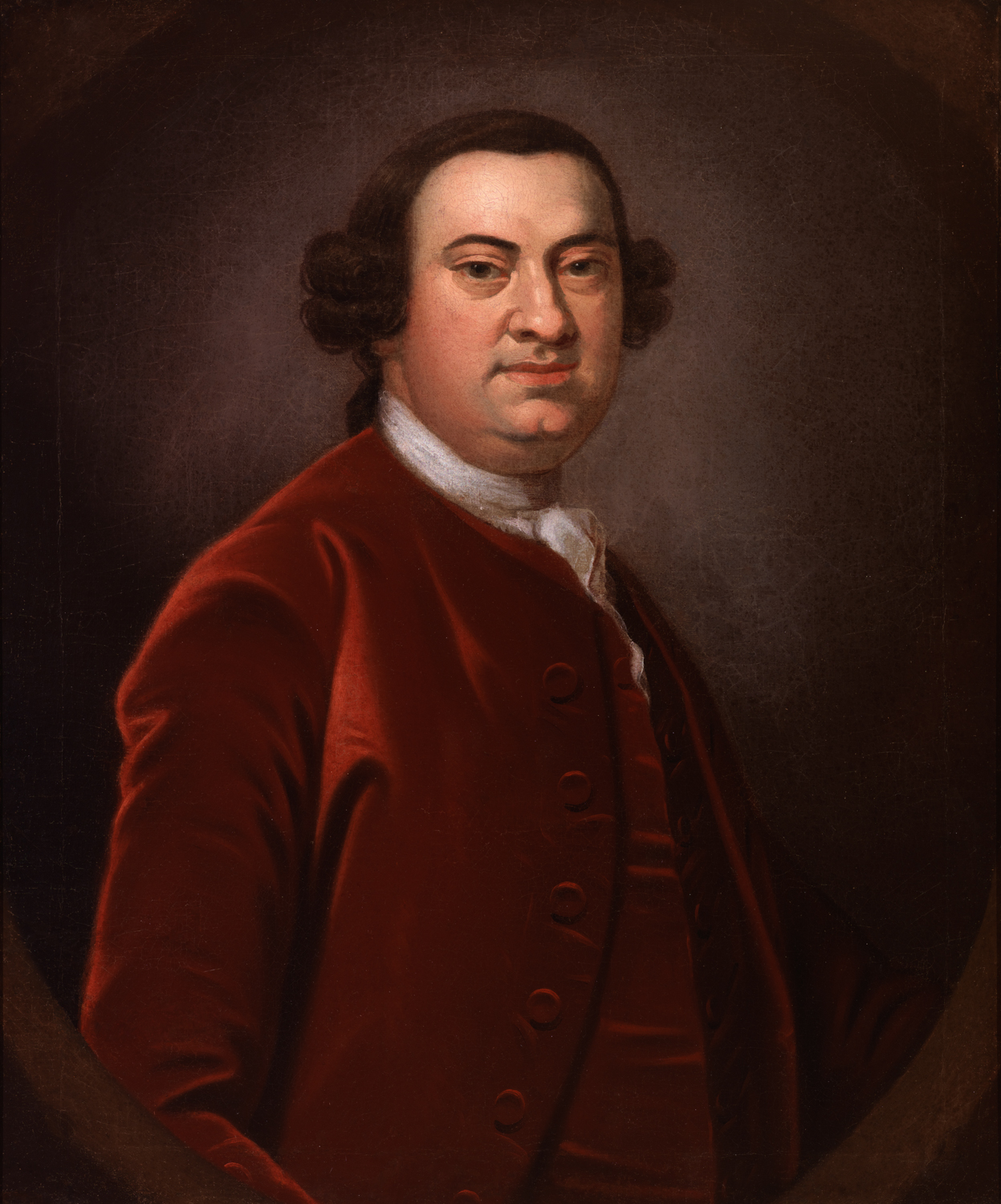
Portrait of Mann Page II of Rosewell, father of Mann Page III

John Page (1743–1808) became a politician, being elected and serving as Governor of Virginia. A grandson of Mann Page (I) and son of Mann Page II, he had grown up at Rosewell. He attended the College of William and Mary (class of 1763) in nearby Williamsburg, where he was a classmate of Thomas Jefferson, also of the planter class. He fought during the American Revolutionary War, attaining the rank of colonel. In addition to serving as governor, he served multiple terms in the U.S. Congress and the Virginia General Assembly.

Other notable members of Virginia's Page family include Colonel John Page of Jamestown and Middle Plantation and father of Mann Page I; Governor Page's brother Mann Page III; Thomas Nelson Page, U.S. Ambassador to Italy; William Nelson Page, known for building the Virginia Railway; Thomas Jefferson Page, officer in United States Navy and Captain in the Confederate States Navy; and Confederate General Richard Lucian Page.

== Description ==
Rosewell Mansion and part of its history were described by author James Joseph McDonald in "Life In Old Virginia" (Norfolk, Va.: The Old Virginia Publishing Co., 1907) thus:

The mansion is substantially built of brick, three story and basement. The foundation walls are three and one-half feet thick. The reception hall is large, the ceilings lofty, and the whole mansion is indicative of refined taste and wealth. From the upper windows, a magnificent view is had of the surrounding level lands and the waters of the creeks and the York River.

During the life of Governor Page, Thomas Jefferson was a frequent and welcome visitor there. On one of his visits, he wrote the rough draft of the Declaration of Independence in what is now known as the 'Blue Room,' situated on the northwest corner of the second story of this house.

The elaborate Flemish bond brickwork, the towering three stories, and the siting of the mansion were all meant to recall elaborate London homes of the era. In that sense, Rosewell was among the most sophisticated early buildings built in America.

"Rosewell was the largest and most advanced brick building in Virginia at the time," writes architectural historian Daniel Drake Reiff. "It was unique in being of London townhouse design, and it seems likely that a London bricklayer was brought over to supervise the massive undertaking and to execute the more complicated detailings in brick – like the door casings."

The similarity in Flemish bond brickwork between Rosewell and Christ Church, built in Lancaster County by Page's father-in-law, Robert Carter, has led some to speculate that the same masons may have worked on both.

The mansion was the first in the American colonies to have a projecting central pavilion, "antedating any other by a score of years," wrote architectural historian Fiske Kimball in Domestic Architecture of the American Colonies and of the Early Republic. "At Rosewell the pavilions, front and rear, are masses deep enough to affect the spaces of the interior, but a glance at the plan reveals that they were adopted for plastic exterior effect."

As originally completed, the house had a flat lead roof behind a parapet atop its three stories, and twin octagonal cupolas at each end. Flanking dependencies in front of the mansion formed an elaborate forecourt. The interior was painted in high style, such that the restorers of Colonial Williamsburg relied, in part, on an order by John Page for paints from London to give a sense of the colors in the Governor's Palace at Williamsburg. In 1771 Page wrote to John Norton and Sons of London for new materials, appending these instructions: "As my house is very much out of repair, I shall be much obliged if you will send me the following articles: 100 lbs. white lead; 20 lbs. yellow ochre; a bri of oyl; 20 lbs. of Venetian Red; 2 gallons of spts of Turpentine; 5 lbs. of Red lead; 3 lbs. lamp Black; 2 lbs. of white Coperas."

== See also ==
- Corotoman
- Carter's Grove
- Shirley Plantation
- Piney Swamp
- Timberneck
- Fairfield Foundation
