= Norvoll =

Norvoll is a Norwegian surname. Notable people with the surname include:

- Øystein Norvoll (born 1954), Norwegian guitarist
- Tomas Norvoll (born 1972), Norwegian politician

== See also ==
- Norvell (name)
