= Fairfield Plantation =

Fairfield Plantation may refer to the following places in the United States:

- Fairfield Plantation, Georgia, a census-designated place
- Fairfield Plantation (Charleston County, South Carolina)
- Fairfield Plantation (Gloucester County, Virginia)
