= Lucy Burwell Berkeley =

Colonial Virginian woman (1683–1716)

Lucy Burwell Berkeley (November 21, 1683–December 16, 1716) was a white American aristocrat of the Burwell family of Virginia. She is known for having been courted by Governor Francis Nicholson when she was 17 years old. When she did not return his affections, the middle-aged Nicholson threatened her family. Burwell Berkeley was among the women of the early 18th century that sought a marriage based upon her feelings of love and affection—for a man of refined manners, good character, and emotional health—over political and financial status. Nicholson had threatened her family and the man that she would marry. Philip Ludwell, a family member, interceded on her behalf and the Virginia Governor's Council asked Anne, Queen of Great Britain to remove Nicholson from his role of governor of the Virginia colony.

She married Edward Berkeley from another elite family of Virginia and they had a good marriage. She died after 13 years of marriage and five children. Her epitaph included that "She never in all the time she lived with her Husband gave him so much as once cause to be displeased with Her".

== Early life ==
Lucy Burwell, born on November 21, 1683, was the daughter of Abigail Smith and Lewis Burwell (1652-c.1710). She was probably born in Gloucester County, Virginia at the Fairfield plantation on Carters Creek. Lewis Burwell's estate was located in Gloucester County on Carters Creek, two miles upstream of Rosewell and later of King's Creek in York County, Virginia. Abigail, the niece and heiress of General Nathaniel Bacon's estate, was Lewis Burwell's first wife, with whom they had four sons and six daughters. He later married Martha Lear Cole, with whom they had a son and three daughters. Burwell was a member of the Virginia Governor's Council from 1702 to 1710, the year that he died.

== Francis Nicholson ==
At the age of 16, Burwell was "high born and beautiful". She received her first love letter from 44-year-old Governor Francis Nicholson, written on the night before Valentine's Day. He began courting her, during which he visited her and corresponded with her. He sent her a "flood of poems, missives (tender and otherwise), memoranda, menaces, and memorials." He fell madly in love with Burwell, who was known for her charm as well as her beauty. It was also important to him that she was deeply devoted to the Church of England and he offered her guidance about her readings and when to take communion. He wrote to her that, as her friend and lover, he "most cordially and earnestly recommend to you to receive the most holy Sacrament Godwilling next Easter." He said that he prayed that she be pleased "to read the three books I herewith presume to send you, in one of them there is a prayer about marrying." (Note: Francis Nicholson to Lucy Burwell, ca. 1701, Francis Nicholson Papers, Colonial Williamsburg Foundation.) He called her "fair Angel" and "dear Saint".

He also wrote letters to her parents, sometimes daily, asking for their help with the relationship. In the summer of 1700, Nicholson nominated Lewis Burwell to the Governor's Council, which was an honor. Lewis Burwell refused the position. Her father publicly stated that his daughter was free to marry whomever she chose.

She continued to entertain other men. Edward Berkeley—around 29 years of age, well-educated, and a successful planter from a good family—was one of the men interested in her. Marrying Nicholson could have been a politically expedient decision, but decided the Nicholson was not the right match for her. Archibald Blair, the brother of Commissary James Blair, was a suitor.

When Lucy was about eighteen years of age, she and her father declared that Lucy had no interest in marrying Nicholson, he threatened to kill whomever she intended to marry. He became temperamental and was threatening towards the Burwell family and their allies who were among the colony's elite families. When Nicholson had sent gifts to Lucy, she promptly returned them. Once rejected, he spread gossip that Lucy and her friends had accepted the gifts, which tarnished her reputation. When in public, Lucy was called names and felt threatened by the behavior of others. Philip Ludwell, a relative and member of the Governor's Council, interceded on her behalf with the governor, with comportment and gentility.

Nicholson's behavior, along with his unpopular policies, drove four Burwell relatives and two others to petition Anne, Queen of Great Britain for Nicholson's removal as governor. Titled "Memorial Concerning the Maladministration of Governor Nicholson", it was signed by six councilors John Blair, Benjamin Harrison, Robert Carter, Matthew Page, Philip Ludwell, and John Lightfoot. The document focused on the Governor's acts of "injustice, oppression, and insolence" towards the councilors and "other public abuses", which were not detailed. Several others sent in letters of support for the petition to the Queen.

At a time when leading Virginians were searching for a dignified regional identity and attempting to check the power of the governor, Burwell's refusal of Nicholson did much both to legitimize the Virginia elite's grievances against him and to provide compelling evidence of his despotic and dishonorable tendencies. In exercising her prerogative to choose her own husband, surely the most public and free act of her short life, Lucy Burwell became, in the annals of Virginia folklore, a symbol of regional resistance to the abuse of power.

— Biographer Kathleen M. Brown

== Marriage ==
Burwell and Edmund Berkeley (ca. 1665–1718), the son of Mary Mann and Edmund Berkeley of Gloucester County, married on December 1, 1703. Edmund, from Petsworth Parish of Gloucester County, was a successful planter with large holdings in Middlesex, Gloucester, and King and Queen Counties. He was appointed to the Council in 1713, a position that he held until his death in 1718 and was County Lieutenant in Middlesex in 1715.

Lucy rejected Nicholson at a time when young women began to be advised to seek husbands that would make good companions, by seeking physical, intellectual, and social compatibility from men that they loved and felt affection. More specifically, advice manuals of the early eighteenth century advised selecting partners who were refined, with good manners, moral character, intelligence and a nice temperament — who they were attracted to.

Lucy and her brothers and sisters married into established families in New Kent, which influenced the politics of Colonial Virginia at that time. It was Edward's second marriage. He was previously married to Mary Mason; they had no children.

Lucy and Edmund lived in Petsworth Parish in Gloucester County until 1712 or 1713 and then lived on Barn Elms plantation in Middlesex County, Virginia. They had two sons—Lewis and Edmund–and three daughters—Lucy, Mary and Sarah. Most of the Berkeleys (with this spelling) living in Virginia descended from this couple.

== Death ==
Burwell Berkeley died on December 16, 1716, and was buried at Barn Elms in Middlesex County. Edmund Berkeley added an epitaph to her gravestone about their marriage:

She never in all the time she lived with her Husband gave him so much as once cause to be displeased with Her.

Edmund died December 15, 1718.

== Bibliography ==
- Bellet, Louise Pecquet du (1976). Some Prominent Virginia Families. Genealogical Publishing Com. p. 384. ISBN 978-0-8063-0722-0.
- Bond, Edward L. (2004). Spreading the Gospel in Colonial Virginia: Sermons and Devotional Writings. Lexington Books. pp. 69–70. ISBN 978-0-7391-0720-1.
