= Thomas Jefferson Page =

Naval officer (1808-1899)

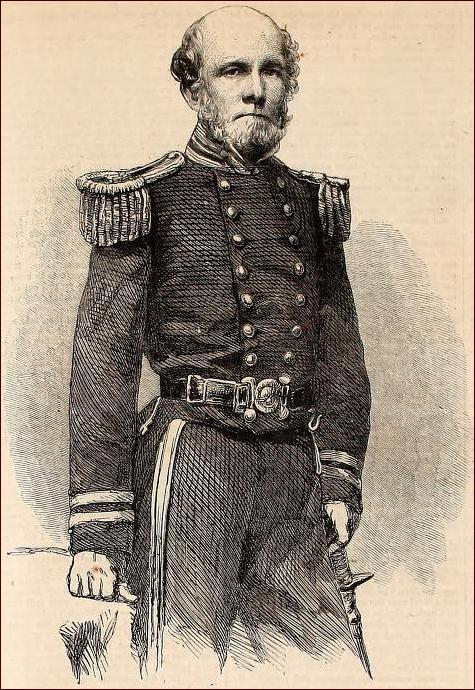
- Harper's Weekly, 1859
- Born: January 4, 1808; Rosewell, Virginia
- Died: October 26, 1899 (aged 91); Rome, Italy
- Burial place: Protestant Cemetery, Rome
- Spouse: Benjamina Price
- Military career
- Allegiance: United States of America; Confederate States of America
- Branch: United States Navy; Confederate States Navy
- Service years: 1827-1861 (USN); 1861-1865 (CSN)
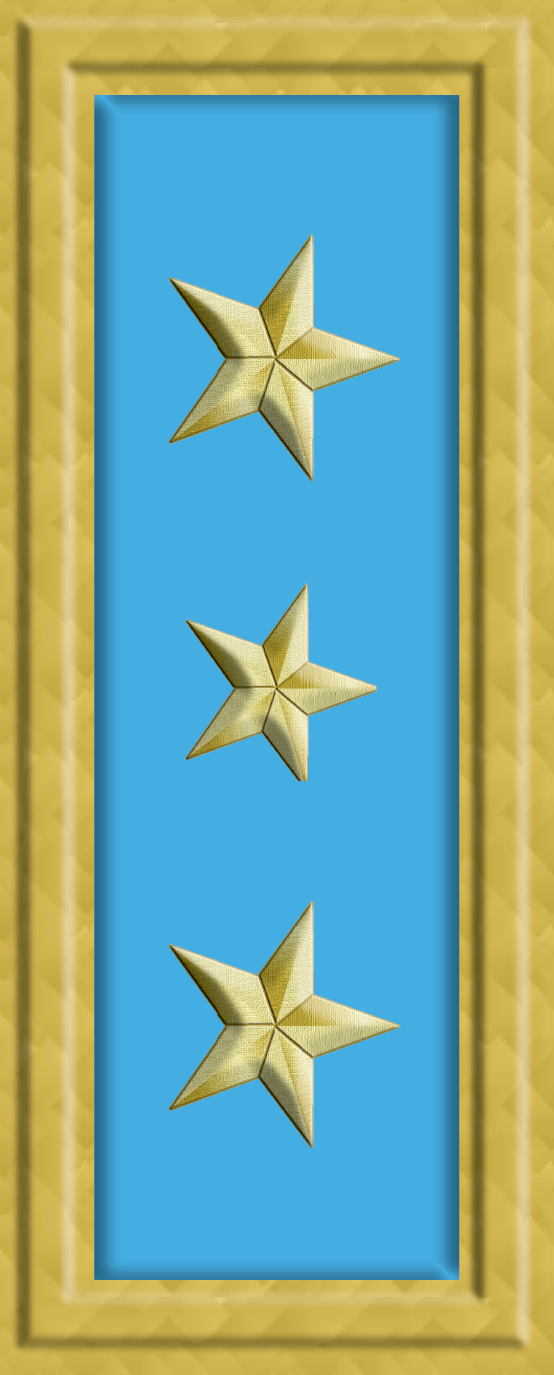
- Rank: Captain (USN) Captain (CSN)
- Units: USS Water Witch; CSS Stonewall
- Conflicts: Paraguay expedition American Civil War

Thomas Jefferson Page (January 4, 1808 - October 26, 1899) was a naval officer and explorer. He served first in the United States Navy and commanded an expedition which made the first detailed hydrological studies of the Río de la Plata basin in South America. At the outbreak of the American Civil War, he resigned to serve in the Confederate Army and later the Confederate States Navy. Late in the war, Page was captain of the ironclad CSS Stonewall.

After the war, he moved to Argentina and established a cattle ranch. He assisted the Argentine government with its defensive installations and modernizing its navy. After 1880, Page moved to Rome with his family. He died there in 1899 and was buried in the Protestant Cemetery, Rome.

== Early life ==
Page was born January 4, 1808, at the Rosewell plantation in Gloucester County, Virginia. He was the eighth son of Mann and Elizabeth Nelson Page. His paternal grandfather, John Page, was governor of Virginia and his maternal grandfather, Thomas Nelson Jr., signed the Declaration of Independence and served as an officer in during the American Revolution.

His father died when Thomas Page was still young. Details of his early education are not known, but in his autobiography, Page refers to his "old Scotch tutor, Mr. Bruce." During the administration of John Quincy Adams, he received an appointment to West Point but upon arrival at the academy, he became homesick and returned home almost immediately.

== United States Navy career ==
In October, 1827, Page was appointed midshipman at the Gosport Navy Yard in Norfolk, Virginia. He was stationed on a receiving ship while being trained in navigation and the use of navigational instruments. In the spring of 1828, Page was posted to the USS Erie, a sloop-of-war that patrolled the West Indies and the coast of Mexico; he served on the Erie until 1832. He passed midshipman in 1833 and received a promotion to lieutenant in 1837.

After serving on the Erie, Page carried out a hydrographic survey of the New York coastline and from 1842 to 1844, he cruised with the battleship Columbus to the Mediterranean and Brazil. Afterwards he worked under Matthew Fontaine Maury at the Naval Observatory in Washington. In 1849, Page commanded the USS Plymouth on a cruise to the Far East. There he determined that a surveying expedition to map the Chinese coastal waters would benefit American commerce. After returning to the United States, the Navy agreed with Page and organized a surveying expedition under Commander Cadwalader Ringgold. Page declined the offer to serve as second-in-command.

=== Rio de la Plata expeditions ===
After declining to participate in the Ringgold expedition, Page was assigned leadership of an expedition in South America to "explore and survey the river La Plata and its tributaries". The La Plata had recently been opened to commerce after the Argentine dictator Juan Manuel de Rosas had been forced from office. In addition to charting the waterways of the Río de la Plata basin, Page was instructed to explore the surrounding countryside and collect natural history specimens for the naturalist Spencer Fullerton Baird at the Smithsonian.

Page commanded the USS Water Witch, a wooden-hulled, sidewheel gunboat which sailed from Norfolk in February 1853, and reached Buenos Aires, at the mouth of the La Plata, in late May 1853. For the next few years the expedition explored the region, sailing 3,600 miles of river and traveling 4,400 miles on shore. In all, the expedition accomplished the first detailed hydrological studies of the main rivers that drain the Rio de la Plata basin. Crew members were also sent out by Page to collect animals, plants, and geological specimens. Their efforts resulted in one of the earliest and most significant natural history collections to be gathered by an American expedition.

Page had negotiated permission to explore the waterways of Argentina and Brazil, but access to Paraguay was problematical. A commercial dispute between the Paraguayan president, Carlos Antonio López and an American trading company eventually led to the exclusion of the expedition from Paraguay. In early 1855, Paraguayan troops fired on the Water Witch, hitting the ship several times and killing one crewmember. When Page asked the navy for help to avenge the attack, his requests were turned down.

Denied access to Paraguay, Page finished surveying what he could and returned home in May 1856. In Washington, he continued to press for action against Paraguay and in 1857, President James Buchanan responded by sending a force of nineteen ships to hold Paraguay accountable for the attack on the Water Witch and other perceived offenses. Page, promoted to captain in 1855, was appointed fleet captain under Commodore William Shubrick.

An understanding with Paraguay was quickly reached and Page was relieved of his fleet duties so he could continue his survey work in the now accessible rivers of Paraguay. By October 1860, Page felt they had accomplished all their goals. The expedition was disbanded and Page returned to Washington. Page wrote an account of the first La Plata expedition, La Plata, the Argentine Confederation and Paraguay, which was published in 1859.

== American Civil War ==
At the outbreak of the American Civil War in 1861, Page resigned from the United States Navy and joined the Confederacy. At the beginning of the war, he commanded artillery defenses at Gloucester Point, York River, and other coastal batteries along Virginia.

In May 1863, Page was commissioned as a captain in the Confederate Navy and sent to England to take command of an ironclad under construction. American diplomatic pressure prevented the transfer of the ship to Page. Instead, he spent a year in Florence and then travelled to Copenhagen where he took command of the ironclad CSS Stonewall, a ship originally built by France for the Confederacy and then sold to Denmark. By the time he could get his new ship from Europe to North American waters, the war was over. Page sailed to Havana, where he turned the ship over to the Spanish authorities.

== Later life ==
After the war, Page moved to Argentina and worked as a rancher in the Entre Ríos Province in collaboration with the Argentine president, Justo Urquiza. He also spent time in England, watching over the construction of two ironclads and two gunboats for the Argentine Navy. After 1880, he moved to Italy where he lived in Florence for a time and then Rome, where he died on October 26, 1899.

He is buried in the Protestant Cemetery, Rome. His tomb was engraved to read: "Thomas Jefferson Page of Virginia; Captain, U.S.N. and C.S.N., Explorer, Christian Gentleman”. It was restored in the late 20th century by the Sons of Confederate Veterans.

Page married Benjamina Price in 1838. They had five sons and two daughters.

== Sources ==
- Malone, Dumas, ed. (1934). "Page, Thomas Jefferson". Dictionary Of American Biography. Vol. 14. Charles Scribner's Sons. pp. 140–141.
- Page, Thomas Jefferson (1923). "Autobiographic Sketch of Thomas Jefferson Page". United States Naval Institute Proceedings. 49 (248).
- Ponko, Vincent (1974). Ships, Seas, and Scientists: U.S. Naval exploration and discovery in the nineteenth century. Annapolis: Naval Institute Press. pp. 108–133. ISBN 978-0-87021-641-1.
- Sterling, Keir B., ed. (1997). "Page, Thomas Jefferson". Biographical Dictionary of American and Canadian Naturalists and Environmentalists. Greenwood Press.
