= Locust Lawn (Oxford, North Carolina) =

Historic farm in North Carolina, United States

- U.S. National Register of Historic Places
- U.S. Historic district
- Nearest city: Oxford, North Carolina
- Area: 16 acres (6.5 ha)
- Built: c. 1855
- Architectural style: Greek Revival
- MPS: Granville County MPS
- NRHP reference No.: 88000422
- Added to NRHP: April 28, 1988

Locust Lawn is a historic tobacco plantation house and national historic district located near Oxford, Granville County, North Carolina. It was built about 1855 by Armistead Ravenscroft Burwell, a descendant of the prominent Burwell Family of Virginia and is a two-story, three-bay, T-shaped Greek Revival style dwelling. It has a two-story rear ell, one-story kitchen wing, brick cellar and central front porch. Also on the property are the contributing six log tobacco barns, two frame barns, frame corncrib, overseer's house, and Burwell Family cemetery.

It was listed on the National Register of Historic Places in 1988.
