= Stevens Thompson Norvell =

United States Army officer (1835–1911)

Stevens Thompson Norvell (February 14, 1835 – August 20, 1911, Ogunquit, Maine) was the son of U.S. Senator John Norvell of Michigan and his third wife, Isabella Hodgkiss Freeman Norvell. He was named after his father's friend and political ally, Stevens T. Mason. He was the grandson of Lt. Lipscomb Norvell, a Revolutionary War officer and an original member of the Society of the Cincinnati, buried in the Nashville City Cemetery, Nashville, Tennessee.

Like many of his brothers he followed a career in the Military. Five of his brothers served in the Civil War and one brother, Colonel Freeman Norvell was a Marine officer in the Mexican War and also later at the Battle of Gettysburg. He enlisted in the army on January 23, 1858, as a private in Company A 5th US Infantry.

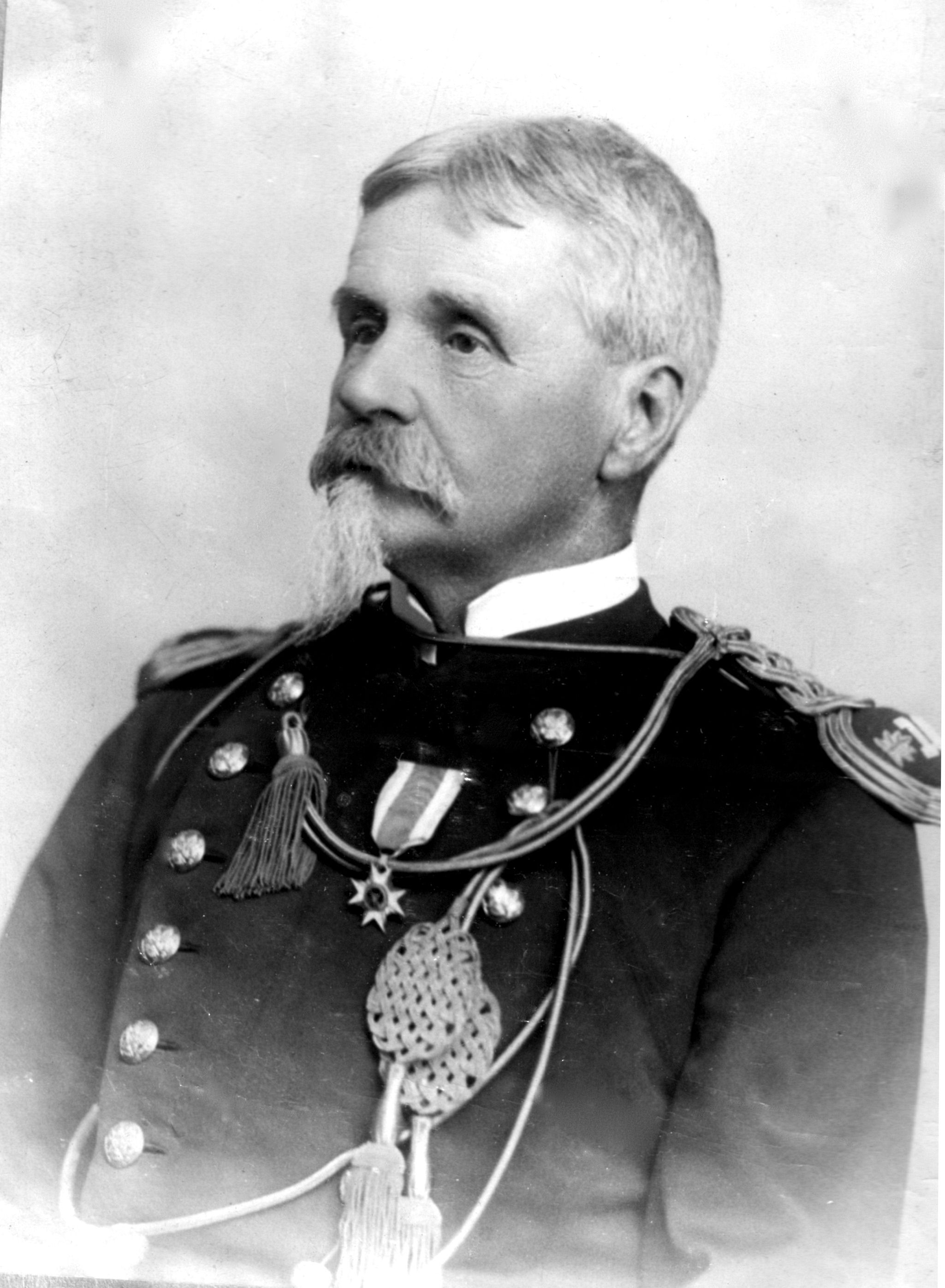
Colonel Stevens Thompson Norvell

During the early part of the American Civil War he served in Utah until 1860. As a first sergeant assigned to the 5th Infantry, he was engaged in battle with the Apache at Peralto, New Mexico in 1862. He was discharged from the enlisted ranks on January 23, 1863, and became a 2d Lt. of the 13th Infantry on February 19, 1863, and a 1st Lt. July 12 of that year (Robertson). Later, he was assigned to the Military Division of Mississippi in 1865 and with the reorganization of the Army after the War was at Fort Stevenson, Dakota Territory in 1868. He was transferred to the 31st Infantry on September 21, 1866, and promoted to captain on June 10, 1868. From May 15, 1869, until January 1, 1871, when he went to the 10th Cavalry Regiment (United States) he was unassigned.

Shortly after the Civil War, Congress authorized the formation of the 9th and 10th Cavalry and the 38th, 39th, 40th and 41st Infantry Regiments, six all black Buffalo Soldier regiments. The four infantry regiments later merged and formed the 24th and 25th Infantries, and were composed of former slaves, freemen and African American Civil War soldiers. Stevens Thompson Norvell was assigned to the 10th Cavalry in 1870 and served at Fort Davis from August 1882 to April 1883 in command of Troop M, 10th Cavalry. He returned to Fort Davis briefly in July 1883. He was also stationed with the 10th Cavalry at Fort Custer Montana. During his tenure with the 10th Cavalry, he spent years leading his company against the Indian threat in the southwest, participating in several actions before finally being promoted to major in March 1890 (Heitman).

With the outbreak of the Spanish–American War, the 10th Cavalry was deployed to Cuba where, as commander of the 1st Squadron of the 10th Cavalry, Major Norvell lead his four companies of African American cavalrymen during the Battle of San Juan Hill, where he earned a commendation (Roosevelt).

He was 64 years old at the time. He and his unit of the 10th Cavalry saw action at the battles of La Guasima, San Juan, and subsequent actions leading to the surrender of Santiago.

After the historic battle for San Juan Hill, Lieutenant Colonel Norvell was placed in command of the 9th Cavalry Regiment (United States). He retired on February 14, 1899. He was promoted to colonel on the retired list on April 23, 1904.

Stevens Thompson Norvell married Sarah Elizabeth Proal (1848–1931) on August 23, 1870, in St. Paul, Minnesota.

Norvell is buried at Arlington National Cemetery in Arlington, Virginia with Elizabeth.
