= Machicomoco State Park =

State park in Virginia, United States

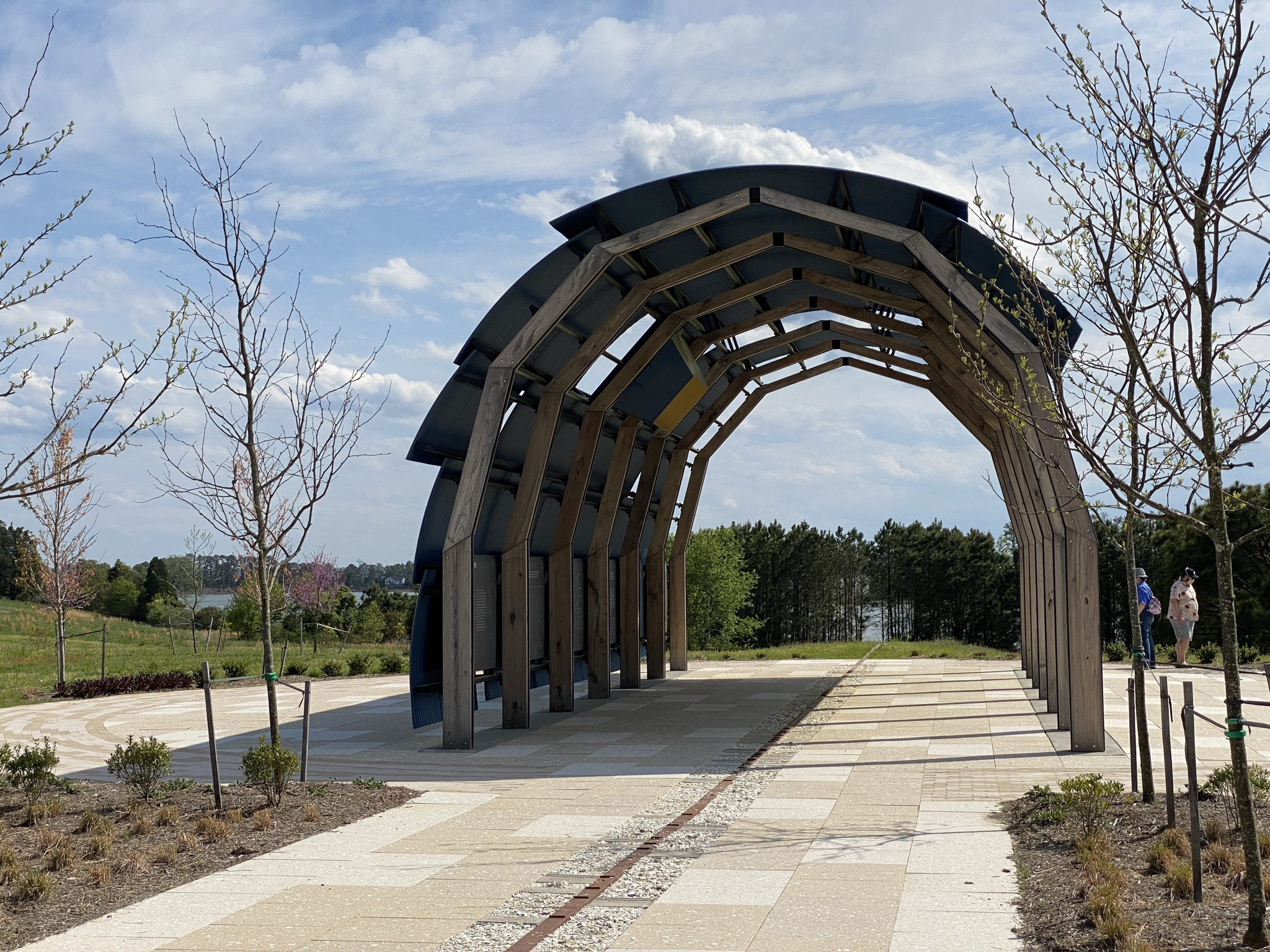
- Virginia Indians open-air interpretive pavilion at Machicomoco State Park

- Location within Virginia Location within the United States
- Location: Gloucester County, Virginia
- Nearest city: Hayes, Virginia
- Coordinates: 37°18′40.48″N 76°32′30.40″W
- Area: 645 acres (2.61 km^{2})
- Established: 2020
- Governing body: Virginia Department of Conservation and Recreation

Machicomoco State Park is a 645-acre (261 ha) state park located in Gloucester County, Virginia. The park is home to the historic Timberneck House, built in 1793. The park also contains the Virginia Indians open-air interpretive pavilion, and a number of other exhibits on native history like those of the Powhatan Confederacy.

It encompasses the nearby Catlett Islands and is administrated jointly with Middle Peninsula State Park. The name "Machicomoco" comes from an Algonquin language word meaning "special meeting place." It lies near Werewocomoco, a village was the headquarters of Chief Powhatan.

== History ==
The area was likely used by indigenous people dating back to at least 2000 BC, according to archaeological evidence found at shell middens.

The park's land was owned by the Catlett family whose house, Timberneck, still stands on the property. The property was sold in 2007 to a land developer, who constructed roads, a bike trail, and a gate house before the Great Recession halted initial plans.

When the land reached market again in 2017, the non-profit Conservation Fund bought the land, allowing the state time to construct plans. Dominion Energy was responsible for part of the funding. The landscape architecture firm Nelson Byrd Woltz designed the park in consultation with Virginia Algonquian tribal members to highlight the land's ecological and cultural significance. Though it was supposed to open in 2020, but due to the COVID-19 pandemic the dedication was moved back to April 2021.

== See also ==
- Rosewell (plantation)
- List of Virginia state parks
