= Hugh Norvell =

Delegate for Williamsburg
- In office 1719–1719

Personal details
- Born: 1669
- Died: 1719 (aged 49–50)
- Children: 16
- Occupation: planter, politician, soldier

Captain Hugh Norvell (1669–October 25, 1719) was a Virginia planter, soldier and politician. He served in King William's War, helped found and govern Williamsburg and several times served as a vestryman of Bruton Parish Church.

== Early and family life ==
Born in James City County to the former Sarah Lucy Bullock and her husband, George Augustus Norvell, Hugh Norvell married multiple women named Sarah. The former Sarah Besouth (1674-1704) gave birth to sons George (1693-1786), Hugh Jr. (1699-1759) and William Norvell (1695-1757) as well as daughters who married and became Elizabeth (Mrs. George) Baskerville (1692-1732) and Mary (Mrs. William) Lightfoot, and Sarah and James who died without having children (probably as children).

The family descends from Thomas Norvell, born about 1591 and who died in Warwick County, Virginia before August 17, 1635, where he was an original proprietor. Thomas is thought to have married Mary Frye, either the sister or daughter of William Frye of James City County; they lived on Skiff's Creek in 1630.

The Norvells were of Scots origin. Norvell is a shortened form of the name de Normanville. It dates to 1190 when John de Normanville was recorded on a grant of land by Bernard de Hauden. The family coat of arms as described in Burke's General Armory depicts three black martlets (swallows or swifts) on a silver diagonal band across a black shield. In the 17th century there were many spelling variations of the name: NORWELL, NOVELL, NOEL, NORVILL, NEVILL, and NORVELLE; but by the 18th century, it was generally spelled NORVELL.

The earliest Norvell in the New World appears to be William Norvell, who in 1619 had a plantation on land that became Isle of Wight County, Virginia. A plantation called "Oyster Banks" was owned by William Norvell near the boundary of Isle of Wight and Nansemond counties in 1656, when the boundary line between the counties was run. Other early arrivals included: Richard Norvell, 1638; William Norvell, 1639; Peeter Norrell, 1647; Walter Norrell, 1650; Mary Norvell, 1653; in Warwick County; and Thomas Nowell in 1654 in Charles City.

== Planter ==
Norvell ran tobacco plantations using enslaved labor across the York County boundary near Williamsburg. His name appears in a patent from the Virginia Land Office, June 16, 1714, as adjoining the lands of Nicholas Valentine. In James City County he is listed on the quit rent roll of 1704 as owning 328 acres (0.513 mi^{2}) of land. Norvell appeared as the guardian (prochain ami) of his daughter Elizabeth in a 1694 lawsuit against Mr. Robert Harrison and Mrs. Elizabeth Archer over the payment due to Elizabeth for an enslaved woman.

== Civic and political activities ==
Hugh Norvell was named as a trustee of the land on which Williamsburg was to be built, under an "Act Directing the Building of the Capitol and the City of Williamsburg" passed by The General Assembly of Virginia on June 7, 1699. One of the clauses of this Act appointed Lewis Burwell, Phil Ludwell, Junr., Benjamin Harrison, Junr., James Waley, Hugh Norwell [sic], and Mongo Ingles, Gentleman-Feofees or Trustees for land appropriated to the uses of the City. These gentlemen sold the half-acre lots into which the city had been laid out. Norvell was still a Feofee/Trustee in 1705 when the Act Directing the Building of the Capitol and the City of Williamsburg with additions was passed.

In 1703 he served on the Grand Jury of the Virginia Admiralty Court and later became a county officer. He is mentioned as a juror in a 1710 trial involving eight Tuscarora Indians. He was elected to the Virginia House of Burgesses about 1719.

== Church activities ==
Norvell served on the Vestry of Bruton Parish Church several times beginning in 1694, especially in 1710-1715, during which time he was President of the Vestry and on December 5, 1710 conveyed the call to Rev. Dr. James Blair as the parish's Rector (an invitation that was accepted). Norvell also served on a committee to welcome Rev. Dr. Blair as President of the College of William and Mary. Norvell also served on the committee that between 1710 and 1715 oversaw building of the new church that remains today as a National Historic Landmark.

== Death and legacy ==
Hugh Norvell died at his Williamsburg home on October 25, 1719 and is memorialized at the Bruton Parish Episcopal Church. The historic church displays two plaques honoring his service. The plaque on Pew No. 7 honors "Hugh Norvell, Vestryman, 1710-1715, George Norvell, vestryman, and William Norvell, vestryman, 1775." The other plaque names Hugh Norvell as one of the members of the vestry who erected the church building from 1710-1715.

His son George Norvell moved to Hanover County, Virginia and also served on the vestry of St. Paul's parish. His grandson William Norvell served as a soldier in the American Revolutionary War, as well as served multiple terms in the Virginia House of Delegates before becoming a Virginia judge and later revived the law school at the College of William and Mary.

Some of Captain Hugh Norvell's descendants include U.S. Senator John Norvell of Michigan, William Walker, the Filibusterer in Nicaragua; and Oliver Hardy, the actor-comedian and movie star, son of Emily Norvell Hardy.
