= Wicomico, Virginia =

Unincorporated community in Virginia, United States

Coordinates: 37°17′28″N 76°30′34″W

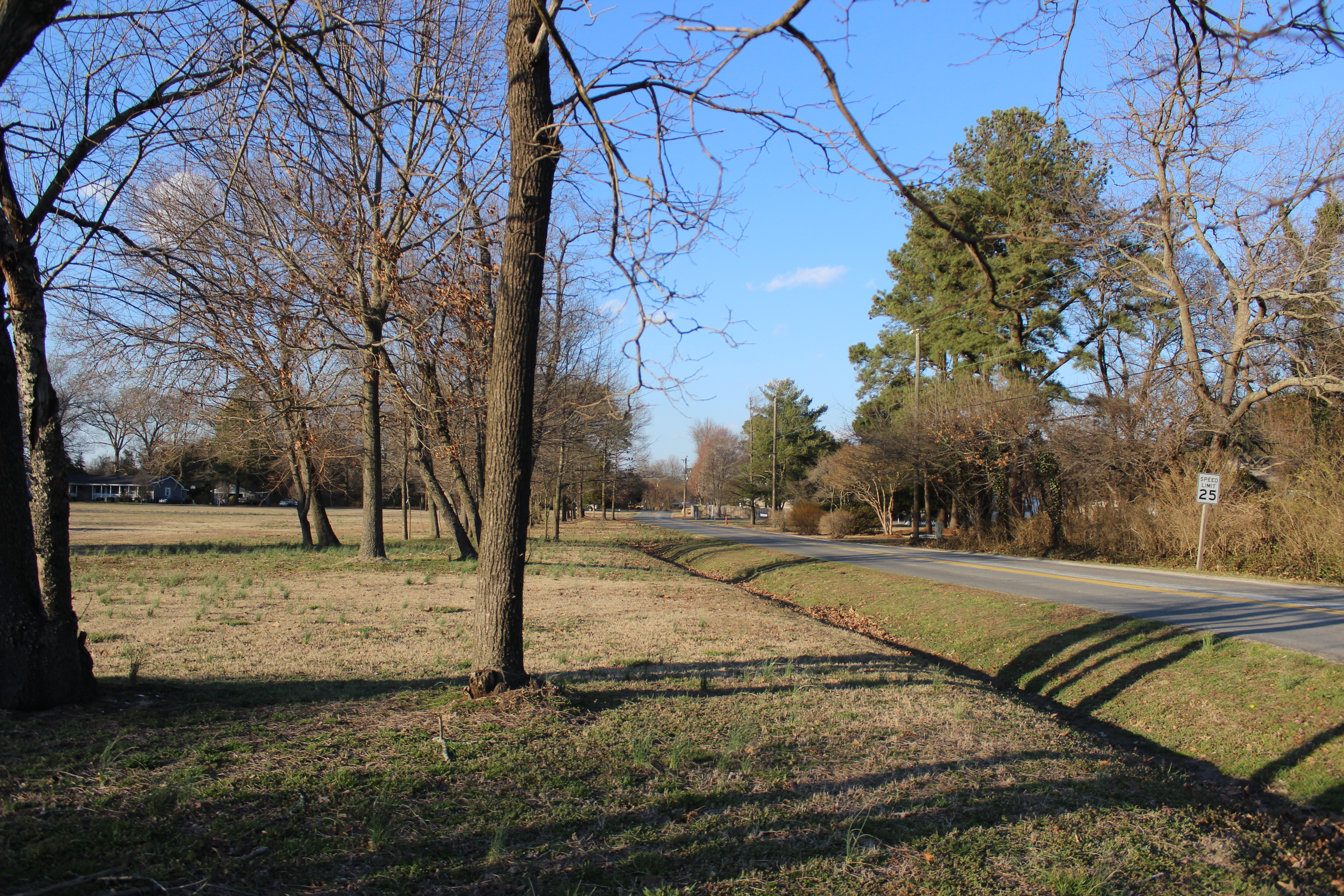
Williams Landing Road in Wicomico

Wicomico is an unincorporated community in Gloucester County, in the U. S. state of Virginia.

The local historic home Timberneck was added to the National Register of Historic Places in 1979.
