= Scott Norvell =

American journalist

Scott Norvell is an American blogger and columnist for the Fox News Website, having run a column there since 2001. Norvell's blog and column at Fox News, entitled "Tongue Tied", details incidents of what he considers extreme "political correctness". He is also the primary author of the former website www.tonguetied.us which deals with similar issues of language use, American politics, and international politics. The top of the site quotes the First Amendment to the United States Constitution.

== Career ==
Norvell is the Northeast Bureau Chief of Fox News Channel. Here he is responsible for directing the coverage of New England from Boston and New York City. He has been working for Fox News Channel since 1996 and has held many positions which include: Executive Editor, London-based European Bureau Chief, and head of the Miami bureau. Prior to working for FNC, he reported from Time, the New York Times, The Washington Post Sunday Magazine, Fortune magazine, and People magazine. He started his career in journalism working for the Corpus Christi Caller-Times, a newspaper in South Texas, where he covered the U.S.-Mexican border. Norvell was most recently the Chief Operating Officer of NewsCore, a digital innovation initiative within the Office of the chairman at News Corporation.

== Personal life ==
Scott Norvell is married to Shelley Emling and together they have three children, Christopher, Benjamin, and Olivia. He is a native to Texas but he and his family live in New York City. Norvell obtained his degree in journalism from the University of Missouri in Columbia, Missouri. Norvell is also fluent in Spanish.
