= Lipscomb Norvell =

American military officer

Lipscomb Norvell (September 1756 – March 2, 1843) was an American military officer in the Continental Army during the American Revolutionary War.

Norvell was the son of John Norvell and an unknown daughter of Moses Lipscomb of Hanover County, Virginia, and the great-grandson of Captain Hugh Norvell, one of the original trustees of the city of Williamsburg, Virginia.

Norvell entered the Continental Army on August 7, 1777, as a cadet in Captain William Mosby's company of the 5th Virginia Regiment of Foot commanded by Colonel Josiah Parker. On January 15, 1778, he became regimental paymaster. He fought in the Revolutionary War Battles of Brandywine, Trenton, and Monmouth. He became a second lieutenant in September, 1778 and a first lieutenant in February, 1780. In 1780, he was in the City of Charleston with forces sent to defend the city in response to a British threat towards southern colonies. After the Siege of Charleston, the city fell, Norvell was taken prisoner of war and remained in British custody until the end of the war. From his service, he joined the Society of the Cincinnati. After the war, he was a justice of the peace and early pioneer in Kentucky, where he had received considerable lands as a bounty for his war service. At the time of his death, he lived with his family in Nashville, Tennessee. He is believed to be the first Revolutionary War officer buried in the Nashville City Cemetery. One of his sons was U.S. Senator John Norvell of Michigan and his grandson, William Walker, the son of Mary Norvell Walker, was a filibuster in Nicaragua.

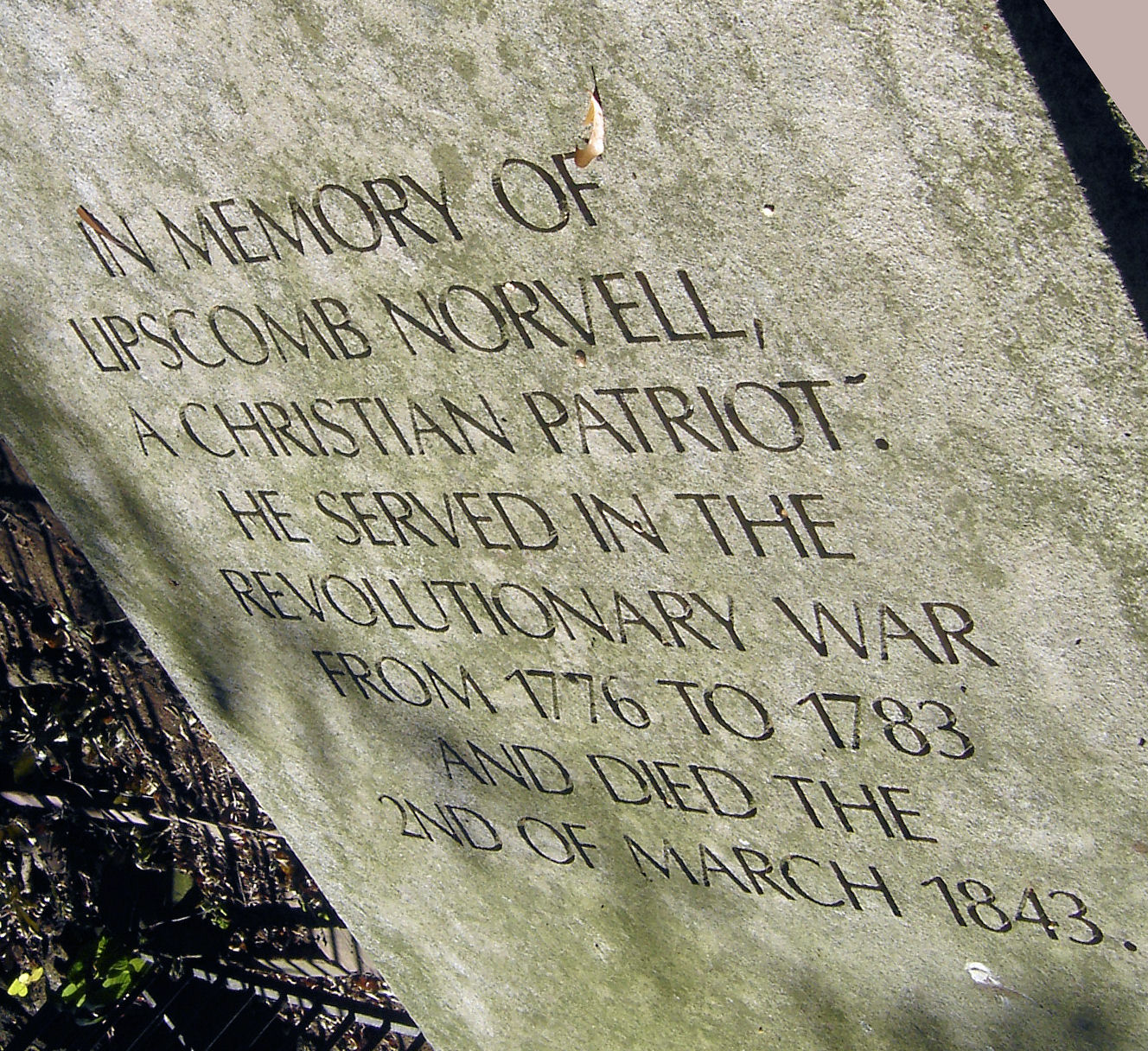
Inscription on the box grave of Lt. Lipscomb Norvell, Old City Cemetery Nashville.
