= John Norvell =

American politician (1789–1850)

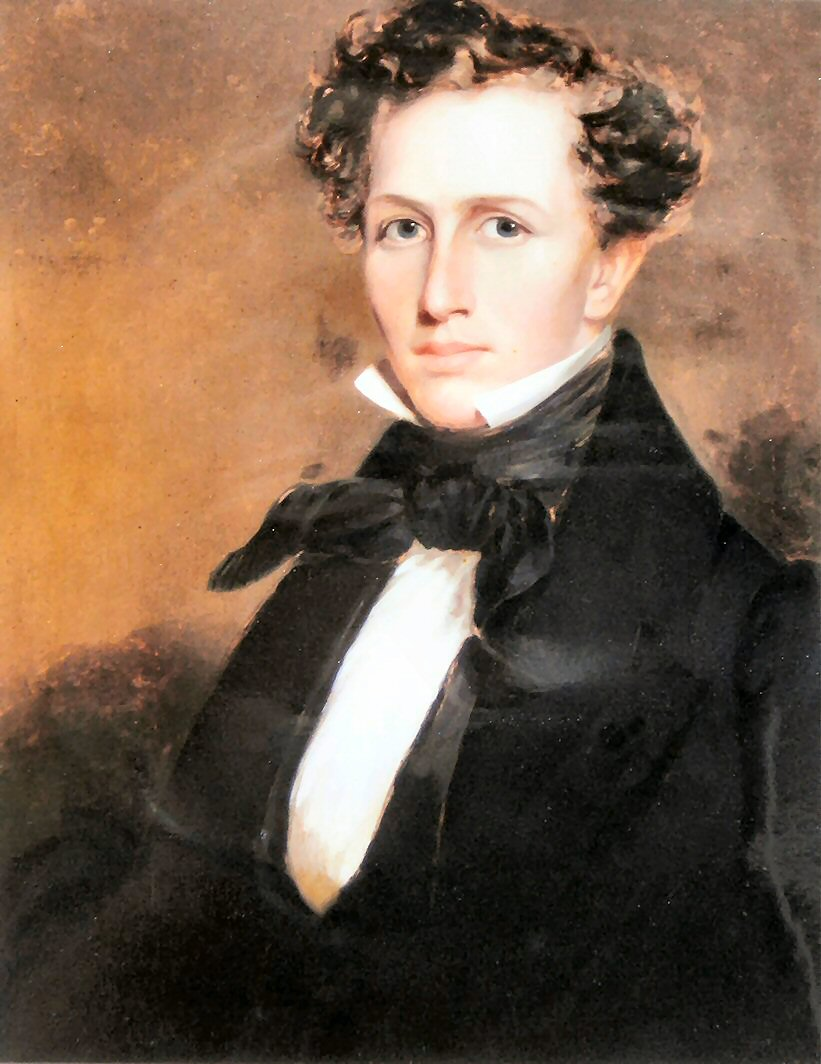

United States Senator from Michigan
- In office January 26, 1837 – March 3, 1841
- Preceded by: Himself (Shadow Senator)
- Succeeded by: William Woodbridge

United States Shadow Senator from the Michigan Territory
- In office November 10, 1835 – January 26, 1837
- Preceded by: Seat established
- Succeeded by: Himself (U.S. Senator)

Personal details
- Born: December 21, 1789 Danville, Kentucky, U.S.
- Died: April 24, 1850 (aged 60) Detroit, Michigan, U.S.
- Party: Democratic-Republican

Military service
- Allegiance: United States
- Branch/service: United States Army
- Battles/wars: War of 1812

John Norvell (December 21, 1789 – April 24, 1850) was a newspaper editor and one of the first U.S. Senators from Michigan. He is known as one of two co-founders of The Philadelphia Inquirer, the third-longest continually operating daily newspaper in the United States of America.

== History ==
Norvell was born in Danville, Kentucky, then still a part of Virginia, where he attended the common schools. His parents were Lieutenant Lipscomb Norvell, an officer of the Virginia Line in the American Revolutionary War, and Mary Hendrick. Lipscomb Norvell was taken prisoner by the Revolutionary War when they captured Charleston, South Carolina, in 1781, and later was an original member of the Society of the Cincinnati. Lipscomb is buried in the Nashville City Cemetery in Nashville, Tennessee.

In 1807, Norvell wrote to U.S. President Thomas Jefferson:

It would be a great favor, too, to have your opinion of the manner in which a newspaper, to be most extensively beneficial, should be conducted, as I expect to become the publisher of one for a few years.

Accept venerable patriot, my warmest wishes for your happiness.

— John Norvell

He received a reply in which Jefferson first recommended authors to read on government and history, then issued a scathing critique of newspapers:

To your request of my opinion of the manner in which a newspaper should be conducted, so as to be most useful, I should answer, 'by restraining it to true facts & sound principles only.' Yet I fear such a paper would find few subscribers. It is a melancholy truth, that a suppression of the press could not more completely deprive the nation of its benefits, than is done by its abandoned prostitution to falsehood. Nothing can now be believed which is seen in a newspaper. Truth itself becomes suspicious by being put into that polluted vehicle. ... I will add, that the man who never looks into a newspaper is better informed than he who reads them; inasmuch as he who knows nothing is nearer to truth than he whose mind is filled with falsehoods & errors. He who reads nothing will still learn the great facts, and the details are all false.

Despite Jefferson's highly skeptical appraisal, Norvell apparently took his words as a challenge to reform newspapers and decided to learn the printing trade. Norvell did not publish this letter until after Jefferson's death in 1826, the original letter is now lost, but was in his son's possession as late as 1880.

Norvell edited the Baltimore Whig 1813–1814. He also studied law, was admitted to the bar in 1814, and began a private practice in Baltimore. He enlisted as a private in the War of 1812, serving in the Battle of Bladensburg.

Norvell's adventures during the War of 1812 were chronicled in the Some Account of the Life of Spencer Houghton Cone, A Baptist Preacher in America. Norvell and his brother in law Spencer Cone were partners in Baltimore and together at the Battle of Bladensburg. After the battle, they returned to Washington to rescue their wives, who had been left there.

In Washington, D.C., a scene of terror greeted Norvell and Cone. Catherine Cone Norvell was eight months pregnant and could only travel by wagon. They attempted to walk out of the city, but Cone's feet were badly blistered and he found it impossible to move. Norvell found a pony in a neighboring field and caught him. Cone mounted him and they were once again on their way. Stopping at the White House, they asked one of the slaves for a drink. They then crossed the Potomac River and proceeded out of the city for three miles. They were so exhausted that they fell asleep even before they had finished their meager meal, sleeping on the bag of clothes spread out on the floor. While the men slept, Amelia, Cone's wife, awoke and went out into the garden—in the distance she could see the burning White House and Capitol building.

After the conclusion of the War of 1812, Norvell worked at various newspapers in several cities, including: the Baltimore Patriot 1815–1817. Norvell stayed with The Patriot almost two years before abruptly moving back to Kentucky, possibly with the encouragement of Henry Clay, where he took over the state's oldest newspaper, the Lexington Kentucky Gazette in 1817. For nearly the next two years, he maintained Clay's support at home, which earned Norvell apparently no great pecuniary rewards. Early that year, he was again applying for clerkships in Washington, and soon moved east to Philadelphia, where he became editor of an anti-Federalist newspaper. By 1819, he joined the Franklin Gazette, which he published with Richard Bache Jr., the brother of Benjamin Franklin Bache, and grandson of Benjamin Franklin. The Franklin Gazette, which supported Jefferson politically, was published in offices "at 180 the first door on the left hand side of Carpenter's lane, leading from the Post Office to the Bank of the United States."

In June 1829, Norvell and John R. Walker co-founded the Pennsylvania Inquirer, which later was renamed The Philadelphia Inquirer, although they had to sell the paper in November to Jesper Harding. Norvell continued to work in newspapers when he was appointed to an office in the U.S. Department of the Treasury by his friend Alexander J. Dallas, who was then Treasury Secretary in the James Madison administration.

=== Michigan ===
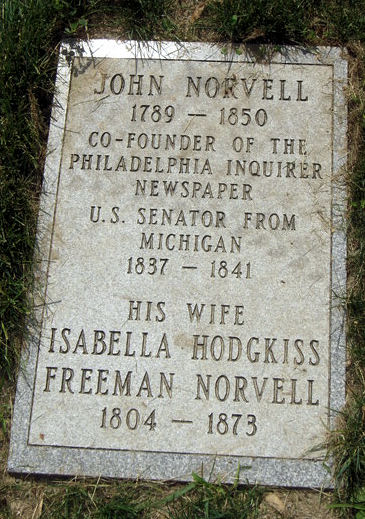
Norvell's grave at Elmwood Cemetery in Detroit

In 1831, Norvell moved to Michigan Territory after being appointed postmaster of Detroit by Andrew Jackson. Norvell was awarded the post because of his support of U.S. President Andrew Jackson, as were many other printers who had supported the Republican (democratic) party. He served as postmaster until 1836. The people in the Michigan Territory had approved a constitution and elected state officials in 1835, although it was not admitted as a state until 1837 because of a conflict known as the Toledo War with neighboring Ohio. Norvell was selected to be Senator in 1835. However, because the state of Michigan had not been recognized, he was only granted "spectator" status.

Norvell was an influential and active participant in the first constitutional convention in 1835. He was a member of the Board of Regents of the University of Michigan from 1837 to 1839.

Upon the admission of Michigan as a state into the Union, Norvell entered the U.S. Senate with the Jacksonian wing of the Democratic-Republican Party. He served one term in the 24th, 25th, and 26th congresses from January 26, 1837, to March 3, 1841. He did not seek reelection and resumed the practice of law in Detroit.

Norvell was a member of the Michigan State Senate in 1841 and of the Michigan State House of Representatives in 1842. He served as United States district attorney in Michigan from 1846 to 1849.

== Personal ==
Norvell had ten sons by three wives. His third wife, Isabella Hodgkiss Freeman (1804–1873) was the adopted daughter of Tristram B. Freeman, a noted Philadelphia printer and founder of the Freeman auction house. Her parents were Michael Hodgkiss and Sarah DeWeese. With Isabella, Norvell fathered two daughters and eight sons, one of whom fought in the Mexican–American War and six of whom fought in the American Civil War. They all survived the war. Colonel Freeman Norvell was a Marine lieutenant who fought at the Battle of Chapultepec in September 1847 and in the Civil War at the Battle of Gettysburg in 1863. Freeman's younger brother Lt. Dallas Norvell served on the staff of General George Custer. Another son, Colonel Stevens Thompson Norvell, was an officer with the 10th Cavalry Buffalo Soldiers after the war and at the Battle of San Juan Hill with Theodore Roosevelt during the Spanish American War. Norvell's older daughter Isabella Gibson Norvell married Capt. Angus Keith, a Great Lakes boat captain, and the younger daughter Emily Virginia Norvell married Henry Nelson Walker, a newspaper owner, lawyer, and attorney general of Michigan.

Norvell died in Detroit on April 24, 1850, the day that news came from Washington that he had been appointed U.S. Consul to Turkey. He is interred in Elmwood Cemetery in Detroit. Norvell Township in Jackson County, Michigan, is named for him.

U.S. Senate
New seat	U.S. Shadow Senator (Class 2) from the Michigan Territory; 1835–1837; Served alongside: Lucius Lyon	Succeeded by Himself as U.S. Senator
Preceded by Himself as Shadow Senator	U.S. Senator (Class 2) from Michigan; 1837–1841; Served alongside: Lucius Lyon, Augustus S. Porter	Succeeded by William Woodbridge
