= Fairfield Plantation (Gloucester County, Virginia) =

Historic house in Virginia, United States

- U.S. National Register of Historic Places
- Virginia Landmarks Register
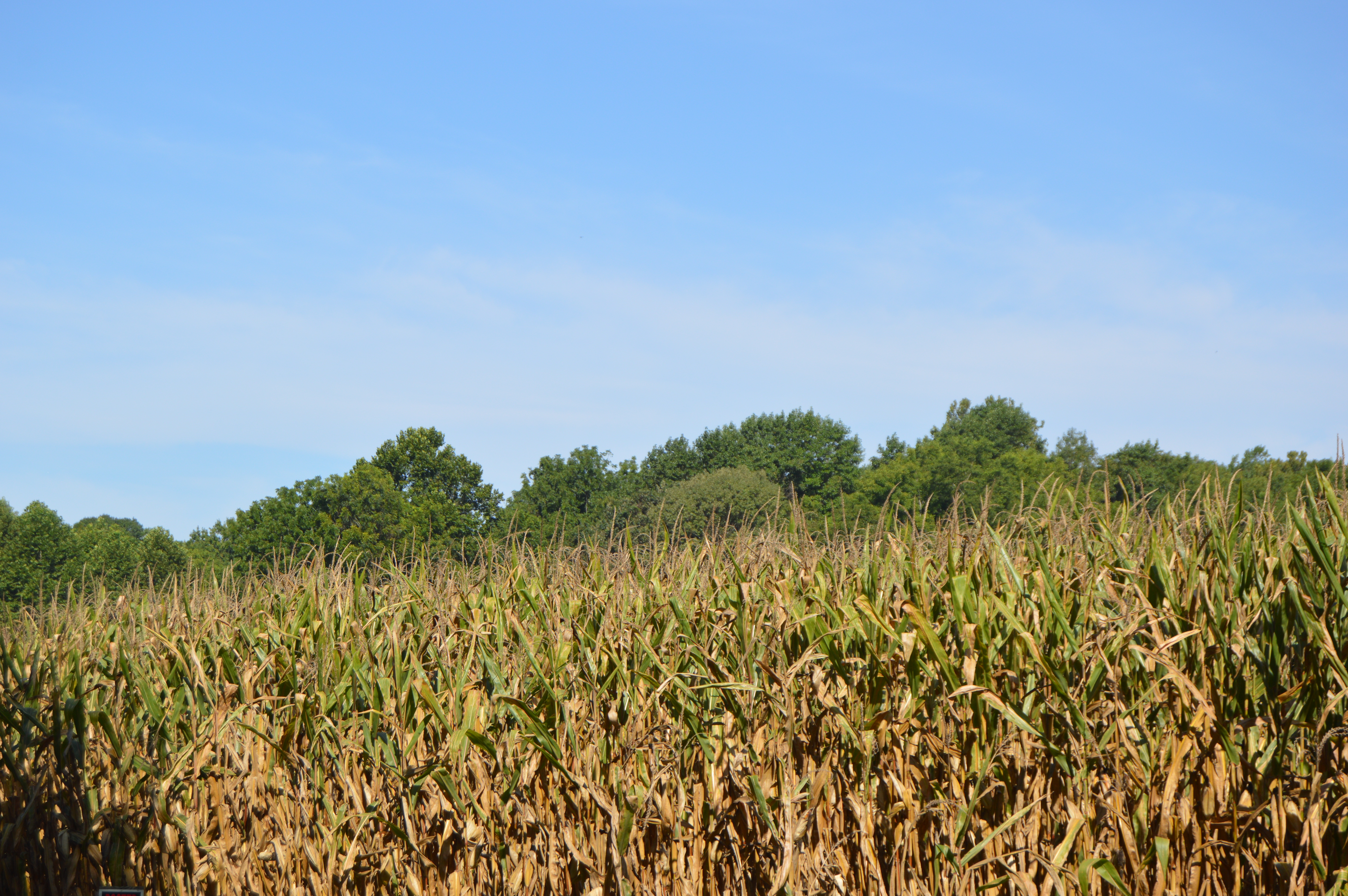
- Overview, planted in corn

- Location within Virginia
- Nearest city: White Marsh, Virginia
- Coordinates: 37°20′29″N 76°33′14″W
- Area: 220 acres (89 ha)
- Built: 1692
- Built by: Lewis Burwell (1621–1653)
- NRHP reference No.: 73002019

Significant dates
- Added to NRHP: July 16, 1973
- Designated VLR: February 20, 1973

External image
- Map of Fairfield within Colonial Virginia

Fairfield plantation was a historic tobacco plantation from 17th century Colony of Virginia, owned by the Burwell family of Virginia from 1642 to 1787. The house was destroyed in 1897 due to fire. It is now an archaeological site that also includes slave quarters, a large formal garden, and the Burwell family cemetery. Archaeological research has been led by the Fairfield Foundation archaeologists David Brown And Thane Harpole.

Built in 1694, the brick manor at Fairfield was described as what was once "the most sophisticated classical house built in British North America to that date" by Cary Carson, retired Colonial Williamsburg research chief. It was built to emulate the houses of the gentry in London.

The house had Flemish-bond brick walls and a 62-foot veranda on the front of the structure that overlooked the large formal garden. It had extra-large rectangular sash windows, and the first known use of a hipped roof with dormers in the colony. At the time the house was built, most of the other buildings were built on posts sunk in the earth. Fairfield Plantation became a National Register of Historic Places listing on July 16, 1973. It is also a Virginia Historic Landmark as of February 20, 1973.

== Burwell family ==
Fairfield was first patented by Lewis Burwell (1621–1653) on June 12, 1648. Lewis Burwell and his family moved to Gloucester (from nearby York County) some time before 1651.

The size of the plantation and the slave population grew in tandem at the end of the seventeenth century as Lewis Burwell (1652-c.1710) inherited land, political connections, and slaves from relatives and business associates. Lewis II took sole control of the property after his mother's death in 1677. As a tobacco plantation and focal point for trade along Carter's Creek, Fairfield was profitable and perfectly situated in a fast-growing county just over a half day's travel from the new capital of Williamsburg. Fairfield reached its apex as a prominent Virginia home and plantation during the first half of the eighteenth century. The land was managed by five different people over that time, but all were focused on maintaining the agricultural profitability of the plantation while experimenting with crop diversification and introducing large scale cattle and animal husbandry. By the end of the century, though, the Burwell family was overwhelmed by debt. The plantation's enslaved population adapted to their new roles in the fields and around the manor house, but many were sold to plantations in the west and south. As surrounding tracts were sold to pay creditors, Fairfield shrank, consolidating the remaining labor force on a much smaller parcel surrounding the manor house. Little is known about the fate of Fairfield's slaves when the plantation was sold in 1787, although some were purchased by neighbors and may have remained in the area.

Dates of ownership	Owner
1648-1653	Lewis Burwell (1621–1653)
1653-1665	Lucy Higginson Burwell (d. 1675) and William Bernard (d. 1665)
1665-1675	Lucy Higginson Burwell Bernard (d. 1675) and Philip Ludwell
1675-1710	Lewis Burwell (1652-c.1710) (moved to Kings Creek c. 1707)
1710–1721	Nathaniel Burwell (1680–1721) (managed beginning c. 1707)
1721–1734	Robert “King” Carter (d. 1732), administrator of Nathaniel Burwell's estate
1734–1756	Lewis Burwell IV/I (1710–1756)
1756–1779	Lewis Burwell (1711–1756) (1737–1779)
1779–1787	Lewis Burwell (b. 1764)
1787–1816	Robert Thruston (1759–1816)
