= Timberneck =

Historic house in Virginia, United States

- U.S. National Register of Historic Places
- Virginia Landmarks Register
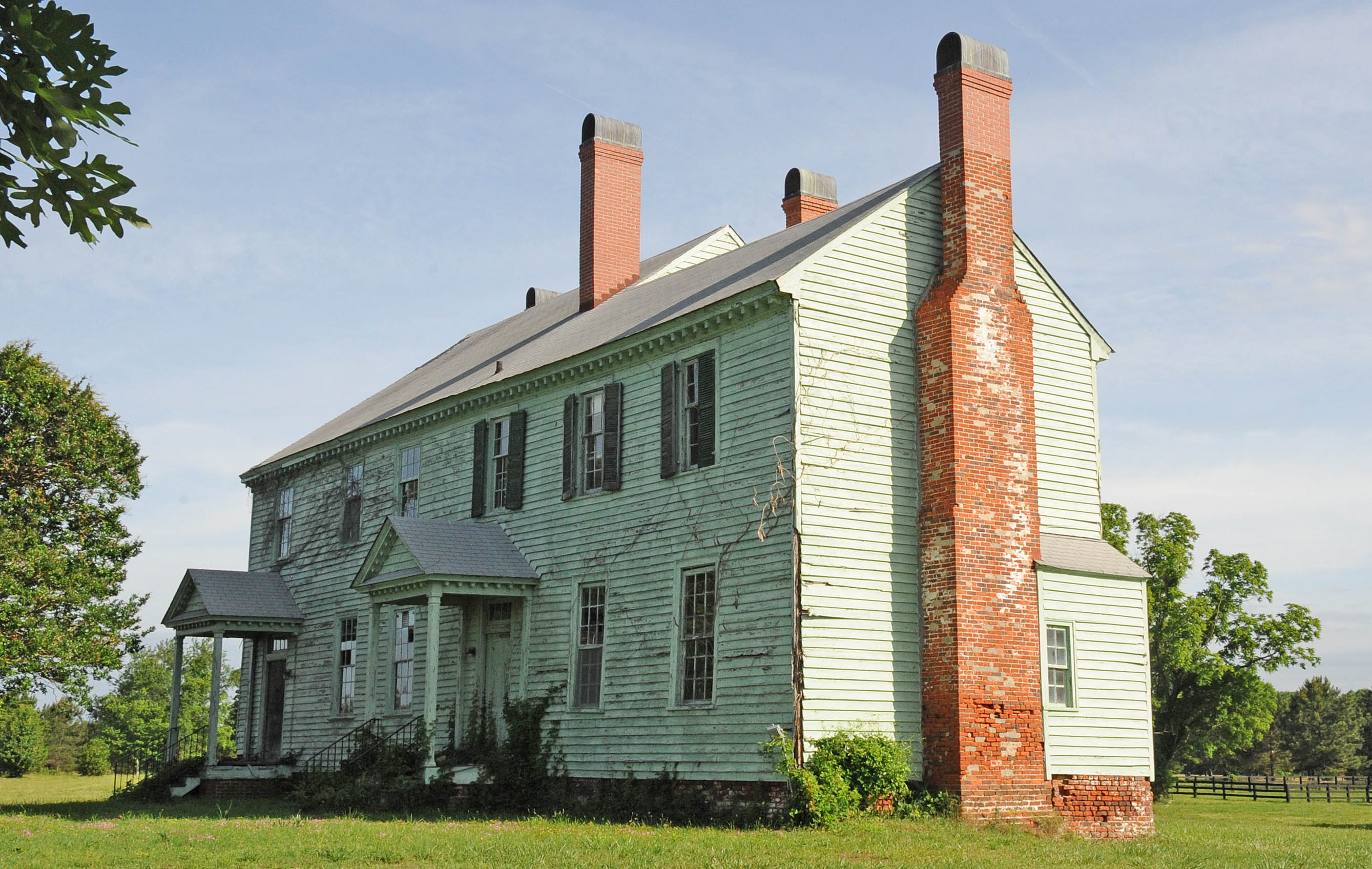

- Location within Virginia Location within the United States
- Location: E of Wicomico off VA 635, near Wicomico, Virginia
- Coordinates: 37°17′45″N 76°32′08″W
- Area: 14 acres (5.7 ha)
- Built: c. 1810
- Architectural style: Georgian
- NRHP reference No.: 79003041
- VLR No.: 036-0074

Significant dates
- Added to NRHP: September 10, 1979
- Designated VLR: June 19, 1979

Timberneck is a historic home located near Wicomico, Gloucester County, Virginia. It was built about 1793, and is a two-story, three-bay, gable roofed frame dwelling in the Georgian style. The main house was enlarged by the addition of a frame wing in the mid-19th century.

It was added to the National Register of Historic Places in 1979.
