= Burwell family of Virginia =

First Family of Virginia

Coat of Arms of Lewis Burwell

The Burwells (known as the Burls among Virginians) were among the First Families of Virginia in the Colony of Virginia. John Quincy Adams once described the Burwells as typical Virginia aristocrats of their period: forthright, bland, somewhat imperious and politically simplistic by Adams' standards. In 1713, so many Burwells had intermarried with the Virginia political elite that Governor Spotswood complained that " the greater part of the present Council are related to the Family of Burwells...there will be no less than seven so near related that they will go off the Bench whenever a Cause of the Burwells come to be tried."

The family was closely associated with the Fairfield Plantation in Gloucester County, Virginia, but several Burwells also built and operated other Virginia and North Carolina plantations, some buildings of which survive today and are on the National Register of Historic Places. Lewis Burwell III built Kingsmill Plantation's manor house beginning in the 1730s. A few years later, Carter Burwell built Carter's Grove immediately to the east in what became the modern-day Grove Community. Nathaniel Burwell built Carter Hall circa 1795 in eastern Frederick County, Virginia on the approach to the Shenandoah Valley. In Granville County, North Carolina, Armistead Ravenscroft Burwell, (son of Spotswood Burwell and gg grandson of Alexander Spotswood), built Locust Lawn circa 1855. Place names deriving from the Tidewater aristocrats include Burwell's Bay in Isle of Wight County, Virginia.

While patriot Burwells served in the American Revolutionary War and War of 1812, and many Burwells served in the Virginia House of Delegates until the constitutional revision of 1850, the only politically significant Burwell of the post-Civil War period was Armistead Burwell, a former Confederate officer who became a North Carolina state senator and associate justice of that state's Supreme Court. The most militarily significant member of the family served in the 20th century: Lewis Burwell Puller, (a.k.a. Chesty Puller) from West Point, Virginia became a war hero and Lieutenant General of the U.S. Marine Corps.

== English ancestry ==
The Burwell family of Virginia originally came from Bedfordshire in England. Their early history is not completely known, but by 1607, they were living in Harlington, Bedfordshire at Harlington House — now known as Harlington Manor.

== Lewis Burwell I (1621–1653) ==
Maj. Lewis Burwell (1621–1653), was baptized on 5 March 1621/22 at Ampthill, Bedfordshire, England. In 1650, the wealthy planter (who owned about 7000 acres of land) married Lucy Higginson, whose parents had likewise emigrated to the Virginia colony to escape the English Civil War, but whose father Robert, after leading the Middle Plantation militia and arranging a stockade to protect against raiding Native Americans, had died in 1649, leaving his widow and daughter destitute. Lucy gave birth to one son before her husband died at age 33, when young Lewis Burwell (discussed below) was just an infant. They earliest Burwells lived at Carter's Creek (in Gloucester County), and after 1648 at Fairfield Plantation. Maj. Lewis Burwell was buried at Abingdon Church in Gloucester County. His widow Lucy remarried twice: first, to Col. William Barnard, son of Francis Bernard and Mary Woolhouse, and later to Col. Philip Ludwell, son of Thomas Ludwell and Jane Cottington.

== Lewis Burwell II (1652-c.1710) ==
Hon. Lewis Burwell was born circa 1652, to Maj. Lewis Burwell (1621–1653) and his wife, the former Lucy Higginson. In addition to operating several plantations using enslaved labor, he served one term in the House of Burgesses (the first of six men of the same name to do so) and married twice. His first wife, Abigail Smith (11 Mar 1656/57 – 12 Nov 1692), whom he married in 1674, was the niece and heir of Nathaniel Bacon), the cousin of the rebel for whom Bacon's Rebellion is named, her parents being Anthony Smith and Martha Bacon. The widower later married Martha Lear, daughter of Col. John Lear.

The second Lewis Burwell acquired Kings Creek Plantation, York County, Virginia, in 1693 from the estate of William Tayloe (the immigrant) (executor William Tayloe). The property was also indirectly related to Burwell's relative Nathaniel Bacon, who had married Elizabeth Kingsmill, the widow of said Tayloe. He was a governor of the College of William and Mary in 1702, and a member of the Virginia Governor's Council between 1702 and 1711. He resided at Carter's Creek in Gloucester County and died circa 1710. He is the namesake of "Burwell's Bay" in Isle of Wight County. This bay was originally called Warascoyack Bay (alternatively spelled Warrasqueak, Warrosquyoake, Warraskoyack, after Warrosquyoake Shire, the original name for Isle of Wight County) until Burwell acquired significant land upon its shores.

Known children of Hon. Lewis Burwell and Abigail Smith included:

- Joanna Burwell, b. 1674/75; m. Hon. William Bassett.
- Elizabeth Burwell, b. Jun 1677; m. Hon. Benjamin Harrison III.
- Hon. Nathaniel Burwell, b. 1680; m. Elizabeth Carter (1688–1734), daughter of Robert "King" Carter of Corotoman
- Lewis Burwell; b. 16 Oct 1682 at Gloucester Co., VA; d. Sep 1696 at age 13.
- Lucy Burwell; b. 21 Nov 1683 at Gloucester Co., VA; m. Col. Edmund Berkeley, son of Edmund Berkeley and Mary, 1 Dec 1704; d. 16 Dec 1716 at age 33.
- Martha Burwell, b. 16 Nov 1685; m. Col. Henry Armistead.
- Bacon Burwell; b. 22 Feb 1687 at Gloucester Co., VA; d. before 1692; bur. at 'Carter's Creek', Gloucester Co., VA.
- Jane Burwell; baptized 16 Nov 1688; d. before 15 Mar 1691/92; bur. at 'Carter's Creek', Gloucester Co., VA.
- James Burwell; b. 4 Feb 1689/90 at Gloucester Co., VA; m. Mary Armistead, daughter of William Armistead and Anna Lee; 1st husband; d. 6 Oct 1718 at age 28. He resided at 'King's Creek', York Co., VA. He was a member of the Virginia House of Burgesses.
- ___ Burwell; b. after Mar 1691/92; m. Harry Seaton; 1st wife.

Children of Hon. Lewis Burwell and Martha Lear included:

- John Burwell; b. c. 1695; d. 5 Apr 1763.
- Mary Burwell; b. 1697; d. 20 Jul 1701.
- Lewis Burwell; b. 1698; m. Martha Armistead in 1715, b.1695; later married her younger sister, Elizabeth Armistead born in 1699; .d in 1745. Frances Thacker, daughter of Edwin Thacker; d. 6 Sep 1744. He resided at 'Kings Creek', York Co., VA.
- Jane Burwell; b. c. 1701; died young.
- Martha Burwell, b. 1703; m. Col. John Martin.
- Armistead Burwell; b. 1703; d. 1754. He was a member of the House of Burgesses at Virginia from Williamsburg 1753-1754

He resided at 'Stoneland' in Mecklenburg County, Virginia, and his descendants and those of his nephew Armistead Burwell (1718–1754) gained prominence in southern Virginia and nearby North Carolina.

== Lewis Burwell III (1698–1743) ==
In the mid-1730s, British Colonel Lewis Burwell III (1698–1743) took over from his father the 1,400-acre (5.7 km^{2}) Kingsmill Plantation after the family that first developed it and married into the Burwell family. He built a mansion and outbuildings as well as a garden. He became the colonial customs inspector for the upper James River. Burwell's Landing, site of his inspection station, also featured a tavern, storehouse, warehouse, and ferry house. Quarterpath Road extended between Burwell's Landing and Williamsburg. By 1740, shortly before this Burwell's death, most of the peninsula between the James and York Rivers was owned by Burwell families—this Lewis at Kingsmill, and trustees for sons of his late brothers Nathaniel (the Burgess from Gloucester County died in 1721; his sons are discussed below) at Martin's Hundred (that became Carter Grove) and James (1689–1718; the Burgess from York County also left a young heir) at King's Creek.

This Lewis Burwell married Elizabeth Armistead, the sister-in-law of his half-brother James Burwell. They had two sons: another Lewis Burwell (1716–1779; who married Frances Thacker) and Armistead Burwell (1718–1754; who married Christian Blair). This Lewis' son Lewis Jr. (1716–1779) continued his father's civic responsibilities as naval officer for the upper James River after 1752: he lived at Kingsmill, married Frances Thacker and named his first born Lewis (nicknamed "English Lewis" for his education abroad and who married Lucy Randolph). His grandson Nathaniel (1750–1802; but not the Nathaniel Burwell discussed below) became the family's highest ranking military officer in the American Revolutionary War, rising to the rank of Major and moved to King William County, which he later represented in Virginia's House of Delegates . Their second son, Armistead Burwell (1718–1754) married Christian Blair (daughter of the powerful politician John Blair) and represented Williamsburg in the Virginia House of Burgesses before moving to Mecklenburg County, as did his nephew, Lewis's third son, Thacker Burwell (1752–80; who married Mary Armistead). This Armistead Burwell's firstborn son Lewis (1745–1810) served as a colonel during the American Revolutionary War and married twice. Armistead's son John (1746–1788) moved to Dinwiddie County. Thacker's second son William A. Burwell discussed below become President Thomas Jefferson's secretary and the only member of the family to serve in the U.S. House of Representatives.

== Lewis Burwell (1711–1756) ==
During his year as president, Burwell IV/I commissioned the Fry-Jefferson map of Virginia.

Perhaps the most distinguished member of the family, despite an interruption in the patrilineal line) this Lewis Burwell served as president/acting Governor of Virginia for a year (November 1750 – 1751) and also served one term in the House of Burgesses representing Gloucester County. His paternal grandfather was Lewis Burwell II (1652 - c. 1710); but his father was Nathaniel Burwell (1681–1721) and his mother was Elizabeth Carter (so Virginia's largest landowner of the day,"King" Carter, who owned approximately 300,000 acres, was his maternal grandfather). Shortly after his father's death in 1721, this Lewis Burwell was sent to school in England. He returned quickly upon hearing of King Carter's death in 1732 and took control of his father's Fairfield and other plantations (totaling about 5000 acres). Within five years of his return, he married Mary Willis, the daughter of a wealthy neighbor, and joined their two estates into a 7000 acre plantation. He and Mary Willis resided in 'Whitemarsh' in Gloucester County. Quickly rising among his peers, he was named to the governor's council (1743–1756). He became acting governor of Virginia on Thomas Lee's death (November 14, 1750), and remained such till the arrival of Governor Dinwiddie (November 20, 1751). During his year as president, the General Assembly never met, but Burwell did commission the Fry-Jefferson map of Virginia. Ill health limited his role in later years, and he died in 1756.

== Lewis Burwell (1737–1779+) ==
The eldest son of President Burwell was born in 1737 and became one of Virginia's wealthiest men when he inherited 7,000 acres in Gloucester County, including Fairfield Plantation, where he resided most of his life. He also inherited about 5,000 acres further north in Prince William County, but had continual financial problems, partly due to his father's testamentary generosity toward his daughters, as well as his own fondness for breeding and racing horses, and economic troubles after the American Revolutionary War. His political career included as Gloucester County justice of the peace (beginning in 1765), sheriff in 1767, and delegate to the House of Burgesses from 1769 until 1776. Gloucester County continued to elect this Lewis Burwell to represent them during all 5 Virginia Conventions (but only appeared for three, probably due to ill health), and after statehood, when this Lewis continued as one of Gloucester County's representatives in the House of Delegates (from 1776 to 1778). Thus he voted for independence, then the Virginia Declaration of Rights as well as the state's first constitution. He married Judith Page, likewise descended from King Carter and the First Families of Virginia, and they had two or three sons and several daughters. The family's original Carter Creek property was sold after his death, as were his stable of racehorses and luxury furnishings.

== Carter Burwell (1716–1756) ==
Carter Burwell (1716–1756) was the son of Hon. Nathaniel Burwell (1680–1721) and younger brother to "President" Lewis Burwell IV/I. Upon reaching legal age, he inherited property from his grandfather King Carter, and built the house at Carter's Grove in the 1750s on the James River six miles east of Williamsburg, on what was by then a 1,400-acre (6 km2) estate. Carter Burwell represented James City County in the House of Burgesses during the General Assemblies of 1742-1747, 1748-1749 and 1752-1755, all alongside Benjamin Waller. Carter married Lucy Ludwell Grymes (1720–?), the daughter of John Grymes (1691–1749) and Lucy Ludwell (1698–1748). Carter and Lucy lived in the completed house for six months before Carter died in 1756. Carter Burwell had two sons, Nathaniel Burwell (1750–1814, described below) and Carter Burwell Jr. (1754–1775) and three daughters who married.

== Lt. Col. Nathaniel Burwell (1750–1814) ==
Colonel Nathaniel Burwell (1750–1814) assumed control of Carter's Grove in 1771 when he reached legal age, and raised tobacco, corn and wheat using enslaved labor. Nathaniel Burwell married Susanna Grymes (1752–1788) on November 28, 1772 and they had eight children. After her death, he remarried and moved permanently to what was then Frederick County, where he had previously spent summers. With the assistance of General Daniel Morgan, he built Carter Hall (Millwood, Virginia) and his son Nathaniel Burwell (1779–1849) would operate it and the neighboring Saratoga estate, as well as serve in the Virginia House of Delegates. He was buried in the cemetery at Old Chapel. His son from his second wife, George H. Burwell (1799–1873) would inherit Carter Hall and support the Confederate cause in the Civil War, ultimately losing his son CSA Private Nathaniel Burwell as a casualty of the Second Battle of Bull Run. George Burwell added the large portico, which is "by tradition" ascribed to a design of William Thornton, architect of the United States Capitol. Carter's Grove remained in the Burwell family until 1838.

== William A. Burwell (1780–1821) ==
Born in Mecklenburg County, Virginia in 1780, after graduating from the College of William and Mary, Burwell moved to Franklin County, Virginia, where he operated a plantation using enslaved labor. Franklin County voters three times elected him to represent them (part-time) in the Virginia House of Delegates. He became the private secretary and friend of Thomas Jefferson and the only Burwell to achieve election to the U.S. House of Representatives, where he served several terms representing variously Virginia at-large and Franklin and neighboring Bedford County until his death in Washington, D.C. in 1821. His former plantation house in Franklin County, now known as the Burwell-Holland House survives and has been on the National Register of Historic Places since 2002. Another historic home in Franklin County, Waverly, survives from a plantation and mills operated by his relative Armistead Lewis Burwell (1809–1883). Avenel, the plantation home of Congressman Burwell's only child, William M. Burwell, whom Bedford County voters ten times elected as one of their representatives in the Virginia House of Delegate, is also on the National Register of Historic Places. William M. Burwell became the last man with the Burwell surname to win election to the Virginia General Assembly, during the final years of the American Civil War. William M. Burwell's eldest daughter, Letitia M. Burwell (1831–1905) wrote two books in the Lost Cause tradition, the most famous being A Girl's Life in Virginia Before the War.

Government offices
Preceded by Thomas Lee	Colonial Governor of Virginia; 1750-1751 (acting)	Succeeded by Robert Dinwiddie
