= National Register of Historic Places listings in Northumberland County, Virginia =

Location of Northumberland County in Virginia

Northumberland County, Virginia, United States, has 27 properties and districts listed on the National Register of Historic Places.

The locations of National Register properties and districts for which the latitude and longitude coordinates are included below may be seen in an online map.

This National Park Service list is complete through NPS recent listings posted October 16, 2026.

== Current listings ==
| | Name on the Register | Image | Date listed | Location | City or town | Description |
|---|---|---|---|---|---|---|
| 1 | The Academy | The Academy | November 18, 1997 (#97001400) | Junction of Main St. and St. Stephen's Ln. 37°55′13″N 76°28′28″W | Heathsville | |
| 2 | The Anchorage | The Anchorage | March 17, 1995 (#95000245) | Northern side of Balls Neck Rd., 1 mile (1.6 km) east of its junction with Waddeys Rd. 37°47′20″N 76°20′19″W | Kilmarnock | |
| 3 | Bluff Point Graded School No. 3 | Bluff Point Graded School No. 3 | June 3, 2009 (#09000396) | 2595 Bluff Point Rd. 37°42′31″N 76°20′12″W | Kilmarnock | |
| 4 | CLAUD W. SOMERS (skipjack) | CLAUD W. SOMERS (skipjack) | October 7, 2005 (#05000526) | 504 Main St. 37°50′38″N 76°16′33″W | Reedville | |
| 5 | Claughton-Wright House | Claughton-Wright House | May 23, 1997 (#97000491) | 2 miles (3.2 km) northeast of the junction of Melrose and Lewisetta Rds. 37°59′41″N 76°30′46″W | Lewisetta | |
| 6 | Clifton | Clifton | May 19, 2004 (#04000477) | 49 Clifton Ave. 37°42′49″N 76°22′14″W | Kilmarnock | |
| 7 | Coan Baptist Church | Coan Baptist Church | March 17, 1995 (#95000239) | Coan Church Rd., east of its junction with Coan Stage Rd. 37°55′31″N 76°30′50″W | Heathsville | |
| 8 | Cobbs Hall | Cobbs Hall | July 5, 2001 (#01000699) | 582 Cobbs Hall Ln. 37°44′38″N 76°20′23″W | Kilmarnock | |
| 9 | Ditchley | Ditchley | September 24, 1992 (#92001272) | Northern side of Ditchley Rd., 2,000 feet (610 m) east of its junction with Apple Grove Rd. 37°44′03″N 76°20′05″W | Kilmarnock | |
| 10 | ELVA C (Deck Boat) | ELVA C (Deck Boat) | October 4, 2005 (#05001160) | 504 Main St. 37°50′37″N 76°16′33″W | Reedville | |
| 11 | Heathsville Historic District | Heathsville Historic District | February 26, 1992 (#92000053) | U.S. Route 360 at its junction with State Route 201 and Spring Rd. 37°55′07″N 76°28′23″W | Heathsville | |
| 12 | Holley Graded School | Holley Graded School | December 19, 1990 (#89001934) | U.S. Route 360 north of its junction with Lake Rd. 37°57′44″N 76°31′09″W | Lottsburg | |
| 13 | Howland Chapel School | Howland Chapel School | January 25, 1991 (#90002206) | Junction of State Route 201 and Knights Run Rd. 37°52′17″N 76°27′23″W | Heathsville | |
| 14 | Hurstville | Hurstville | September 24, 1992 (#92001264) | Eastern side of Balls Neck Rd., 3,500 feet (1,100 m) south of its junction with Shiloh School Rd. 37°45′41″N 76°19′11″W | Kilmarnock | |
| 15 | Kirkland Grove Campground | Kirkland Grove Campground | October 15, 1992 (#92001391) | Kirkland Grove Ln., 1.6 miles (2.6 km) south of Heathsville; 37°54′02″N 76°29′08″W | Heathsville | |
| 16 | Oakley | Oakley | January 27, 1999 (#99000073) | 28 Back St. 37°55′06″N 76°28′28″W | Heathsville | |
| 17 | Reedville Historic District | Reedville Historic District | August 16, 1984 (#84003556) | Main St. 37°50′31″N 76°16′34″W | Reedville | |
| 18 | Rice's Hotel | Rice's Hotel | October 15, 1992 (#92001389) | Junction of Back St. and Judicial Pl. 37°55′01″N 76°28′23″W | Heathsville | |
| 19 | Julius Rosenwald High School | | October 23, 2023 (#100009479) | 19602 Northumberland Highway; 37°51′32″N 76°16′54″W | Reedville | |
| 20 | St. Stephen's Church | St. Stephen's Church | December 28, 1979 (#79003060) | U.S. Route 360; 37°55′11″N 76°28′26″W | Heathsville | |
| 21 | Shalango | Shalango | November 6, 1986 (#86003135) | Sandy Point Rd. 37°49′23″N 76°19′12″W | Wicomico Church | |
| 22 | Shiloh School | Shiloh School | January 22, 1992 (#91001976) | Junction of Balls Neck and Shiloh School Rds. 37°46′05″N 76°19′50″W | Kilmarnock | |
| 23 | Smith Point Light Station | Smith Point Light Station | December 2, 2002 (#02001437) | Bamboo Island; 37°52′47″N 76°11′01″W | Smith Point | |
| 24 | Springfield | Springfield | December 23, 1979 (#79003059) | U.S. Route 360; 37°55′31″N 76°28′48″W | Heathsville | |
| 25 | Sunnyside | Sunnyside | May 23, 1996 (#96000580) | Southern side of U.S. Route 360, east of its junction with State Route 201; 37°54′52″N 76°28′02″W | Heathsville | |
| 26 | Versailles | Versailles | February 27, 1997 (#97000204) | U.S. Route 360, 0.25 miles (0.40 km) west of its junction with State Route 200; 37°53′14″N 76°21′07″W | Burgess | |
| 27 | Wheatland | Wheatland | November 15, 1988 (#87000015) | Lewisetta Rd. 38°00′02″N 76°30′41″W | Callao | |

== See also ==
- List of National Historic Landmarks in Virginia
- National Register of Historic Places listings in Virginia
