= Bluff Point Graded School No. 3 =

- U.S. National Register of Historic Places
- Virginia Landmarks Register
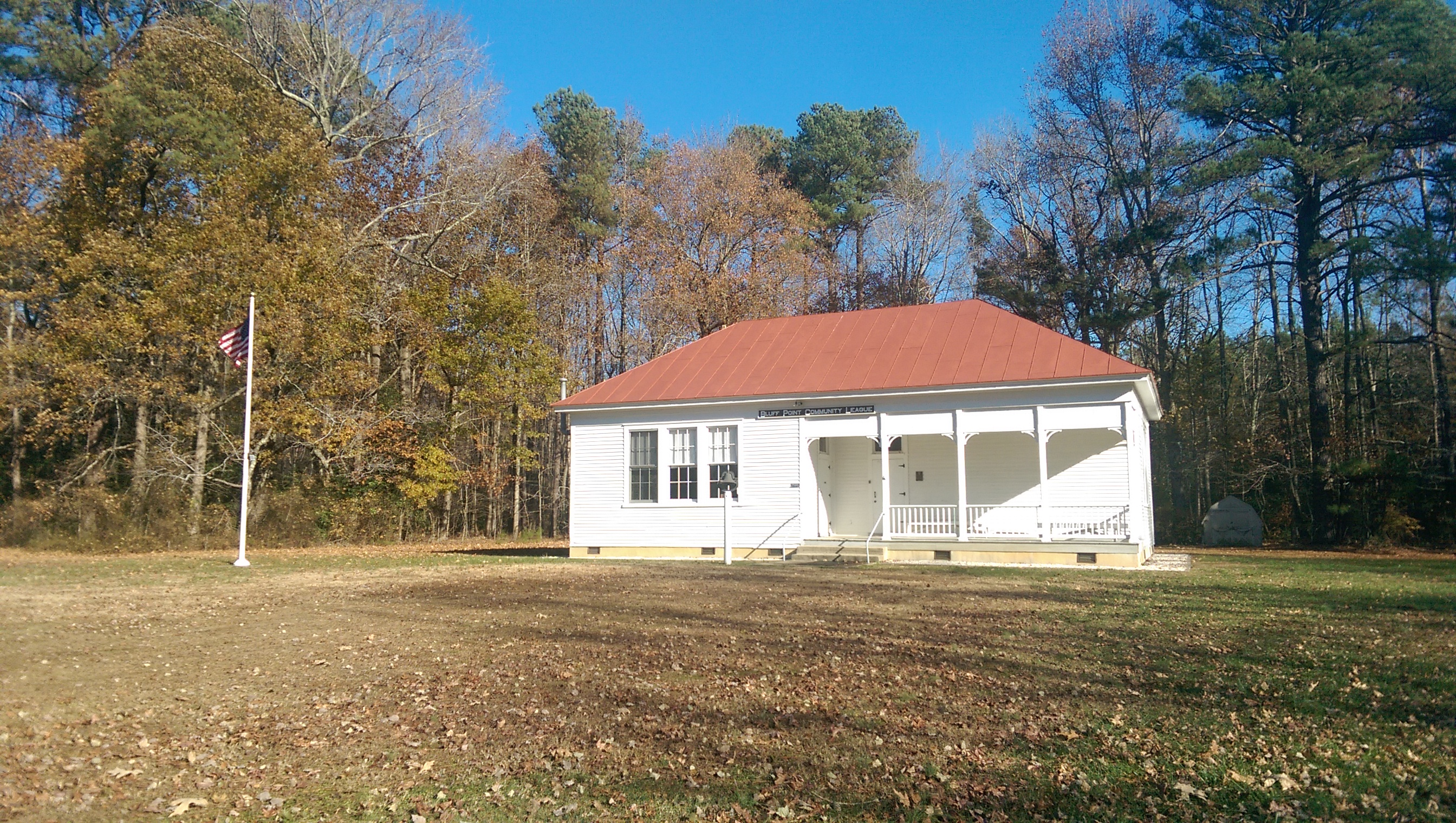
- Bluff Point Graded School, November 2014

- Location within Virginia Location within the United States
- Location: 2595 Bluff Point Rd., near Kilmarnock, Virginia
- Coordinates: 37°42′38″N 76°20′13″W
- Area: 1.5 acres (0.61 ha)
- Built: 1912-1913, 1937
- NRHP reference No.: 09000396
- VLR No.: 066-5052

Significant dates
- Added to NRHP: June 3, 2009
- Designated VLR: March 19, 2009

Bluff Point Graded School No. 3 is a historic school building located near Kilmarnock, Northumberland County, Virginia. It was built in 1912–1913, and is a one-story, two room balloon frame building. A rear kitchen and bathroom addition was added in 1937. It features a wide front porch under the roof line. It was used as a schoolhouse until 1932, and subsequently adapted by the Bluff Point Methodist Church for use as The Community House.

It was listed on the National Register of Historic Places in 2009.
