= Clifton (Kilmarnock, Virginia) =

Historic house in Virginia, United States

- U.S. National Register of Historic Places
- Virginia Landmarks Register
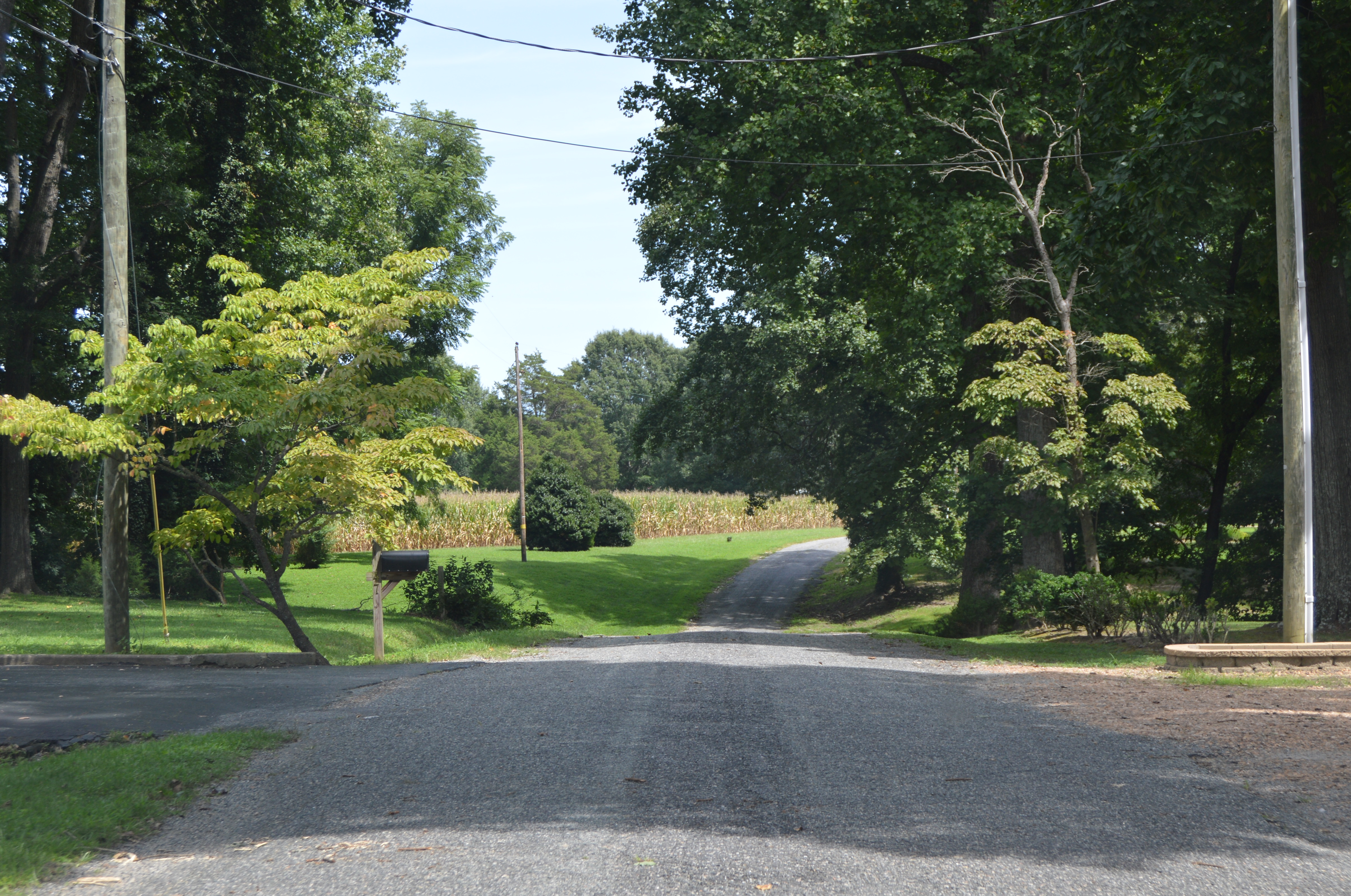
- Property entrance

- Location within Virginia Location within the United States
- Location: VA 360, .25 mi. W of jct. with VA 200, Kilmarnock, Virginia
- Coordinates: 37.71359°N 76.37064°W
- Area: 109.3 acres (44.2 ha)
- Built: 1785
- Architectural style: Georgian
- NRHP reference No.: 04000477
- VLR No.: 249-5029

Significant dates
- Added to NRHP: May 19, 2004
- Designated VLR: March 17, 2004

Clifton is a historic home located at Kilmarnock, Northumberland County, Virginia. It was built about 1785, and is a two-story, Georgian style frame dwelling with brick nogging. It is topped by a gable roof and the exterior is finished in plain, circular-sawn weatherboards. It is a rare example of a four-square plan with central chimney, combined with a front passage and paired stairs.

It was listed on the National Register of Historic Places in 2004.
