= The Anchorage (Kilmarnock, Virginia) =

Historic house in Virginia, United States

- U.S. National Register of Historic Places
- Virginia Landmarks Register
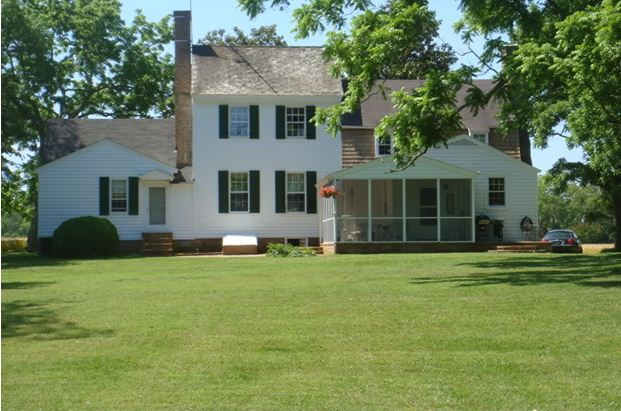

- Location within Virginia
- Interactive map showing the location for The Anchorage
- Location: 1 mi. W of jct. of VA 605 and VA 669, N side, near Kilmarnock, Virginia
- Coordinates: 37°47′22″N 76°20′20″W
- Area: 32.3 acres (13.1 ha)
- Built: 1749
- Architectural style: Colonial
- NRHP reference No.: 95000245
- VLR No.: 066-0040

Significant dates
- Added to NRHP: March 17, 1995
- Designated VLR: January 15, 1995

The Anchorage is an historic house located in Northumberland County, seven miles (NE) outside of Kilmarnock, Virginia, near Wicomico Church, Virginia.

The house was built before 1749 as a 2 1/2-story home with a gambrel roof. It was extended in 1855, including a basement foundation. An annex building of 1.5 rooms and 1.5 stories, on top of a full basement with an interior chimney, which was thought to have been built in the mid-19th century as well, was moved and attached to the house in the 1955. New evidence has been discovered that the Annex may have actually been built over 150 years earlier in the 1690s as a stand-alone dwelling.

The original section of the house was then extended in the rear in the mid-1980s. In 2016 and 2017, the house went through a major renovation with additional extensions added. There are six fireplaces, three of which are part of the original chimney.

Since its Land Grant in 1658, the plantation has only had a handful of owners. The longest, the Byrne family, owned the property from 1929–30 to 2025. The original property (originally called "Road View") was about 350 acres (140 ha) and sits on Mill Creek which feeds off of the Chesapeake Bay. The dock is in Kent Cove, which runs about 500 yards off of the Creek. At the entrance of the woods is the Kent family cemetery which dates back through the Civil War, inclusive of a CSA (Confederate States Army) memorial tombstone and grave.

The property is complemented by rolling orchards and woods sitting on Mill Creek with about 2,000 feet (610 m) of waterfront acreage. The barn lot has a corn crib and additional barns dating back to the 1840s. The property, which was originally a tobacco farm, is in Ball's Neck in the Northern Neck of Virginia, rich in early colonial history.

It was registered as a historic landmark by the Virginia Landmarks Register (Virginia Department of Historic Resources) in Virginia by the Byrne Family in 1995. It also appears on the National Register of Historic Places.

A second dendrochronological study is being commissioned in order to help prove the age of the original dwelling(s) on the property back to the 1690s. Currently, historic records prove a dwelling on the property in 1702.

== Gallery ==
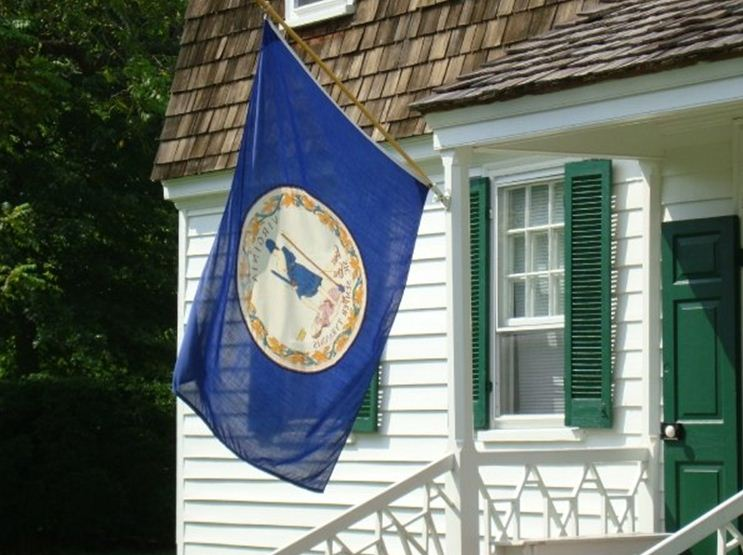

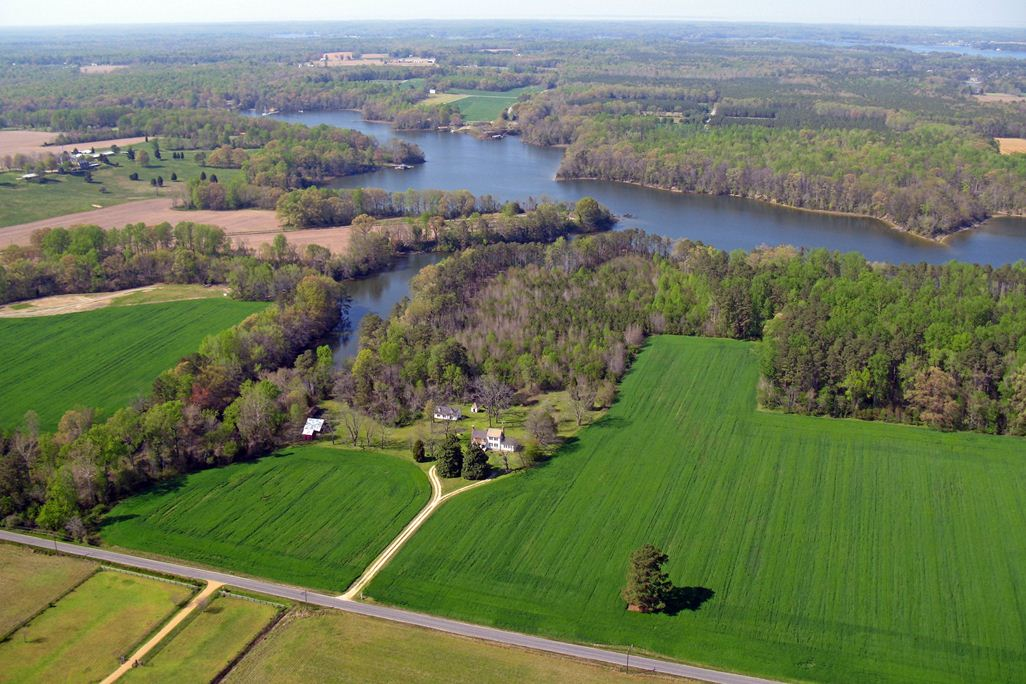

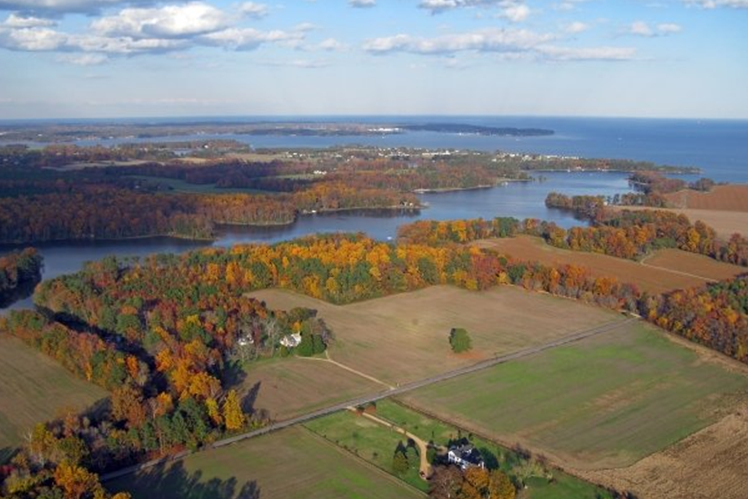

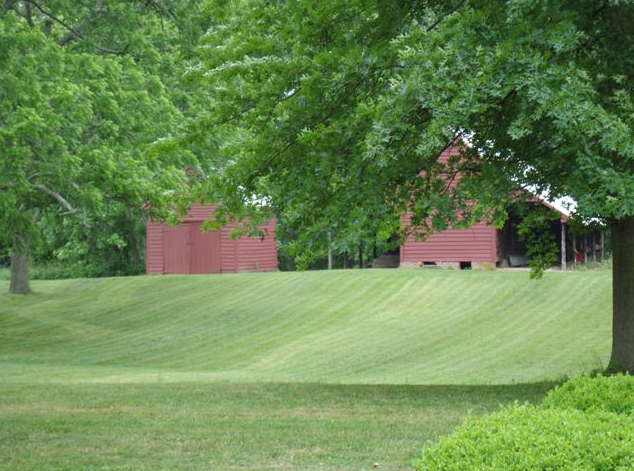

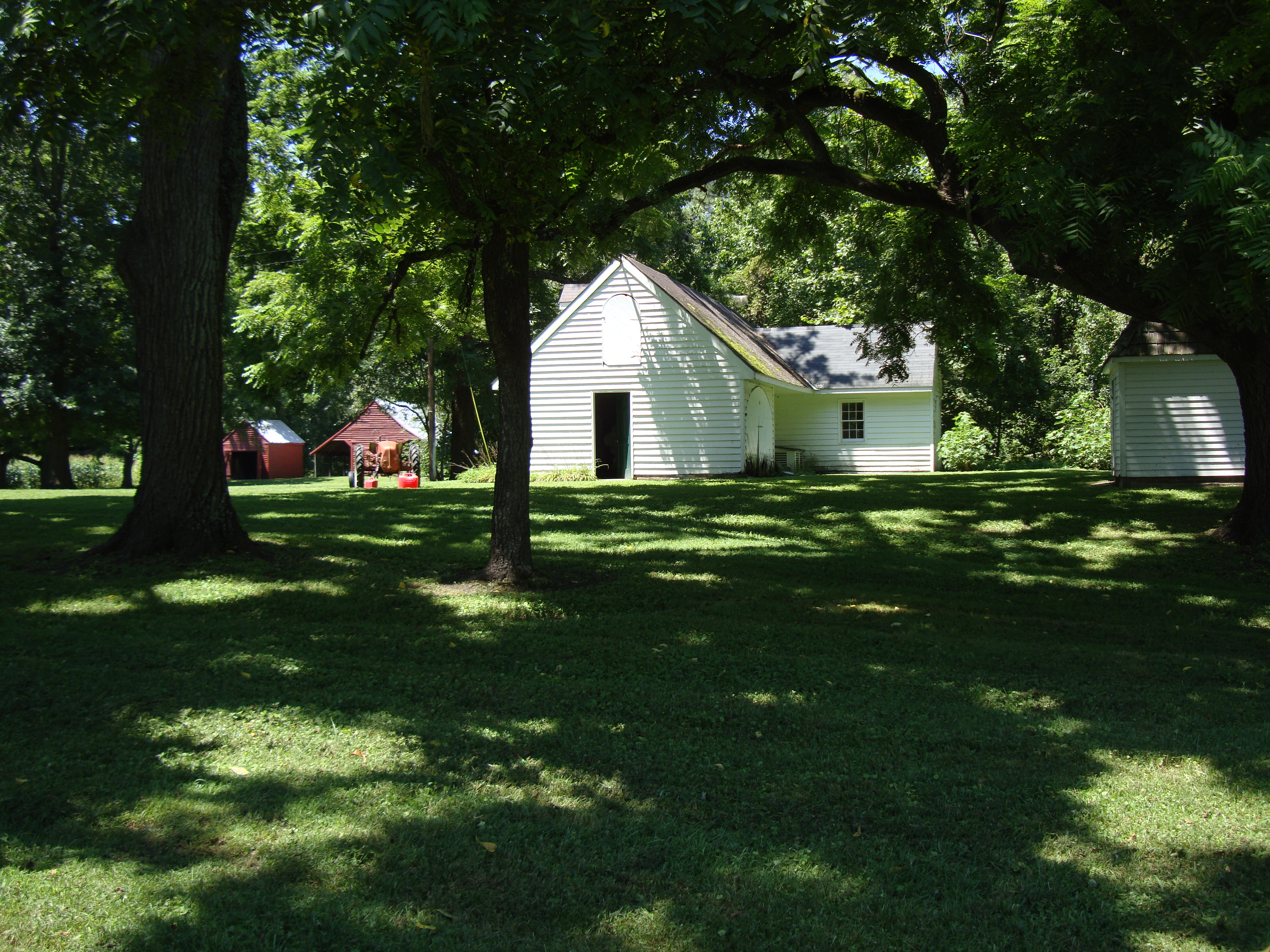

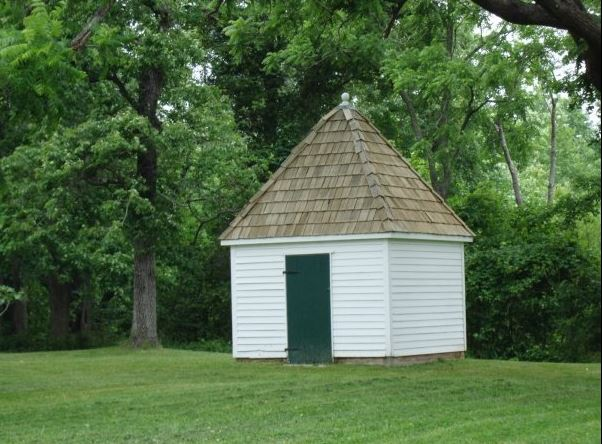

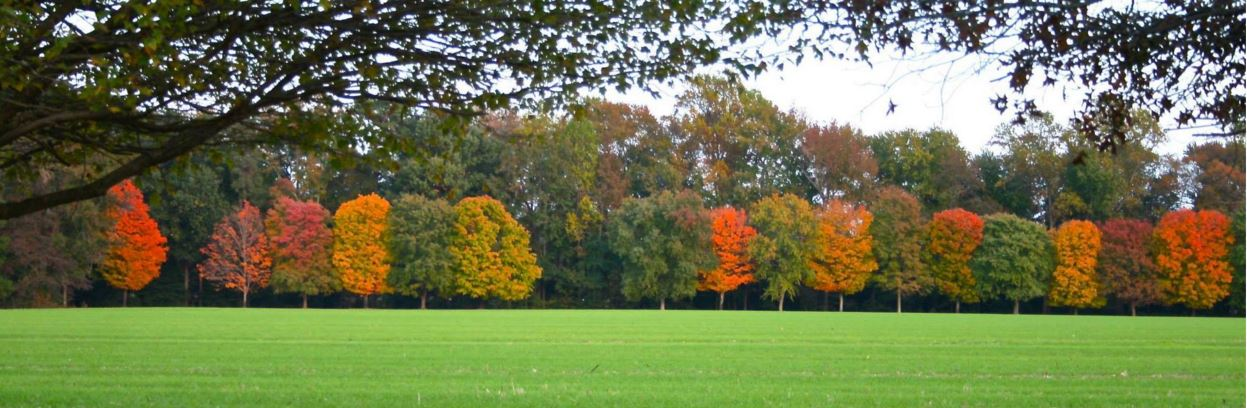

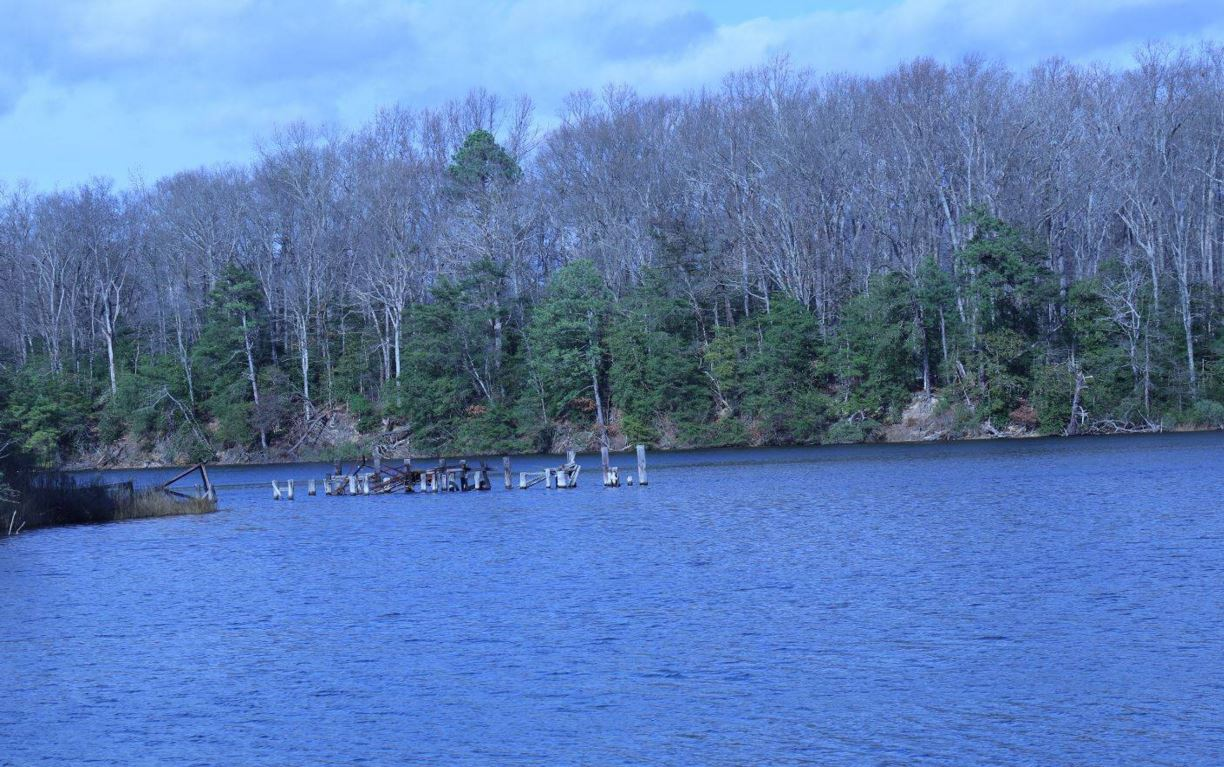

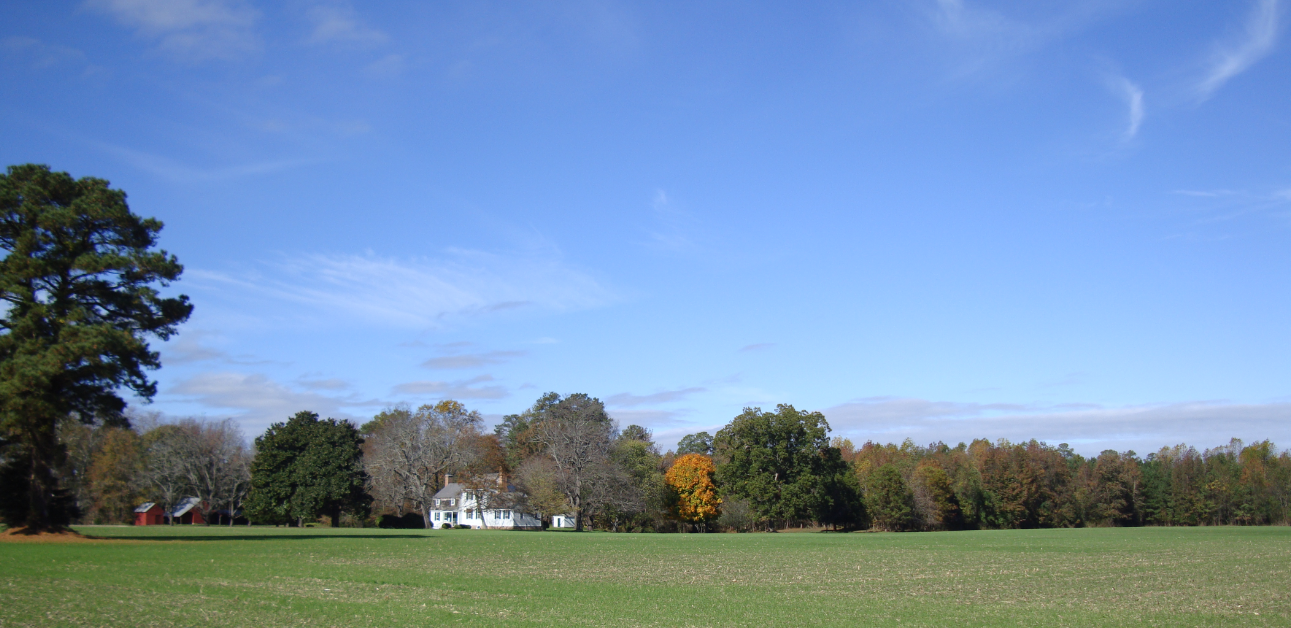

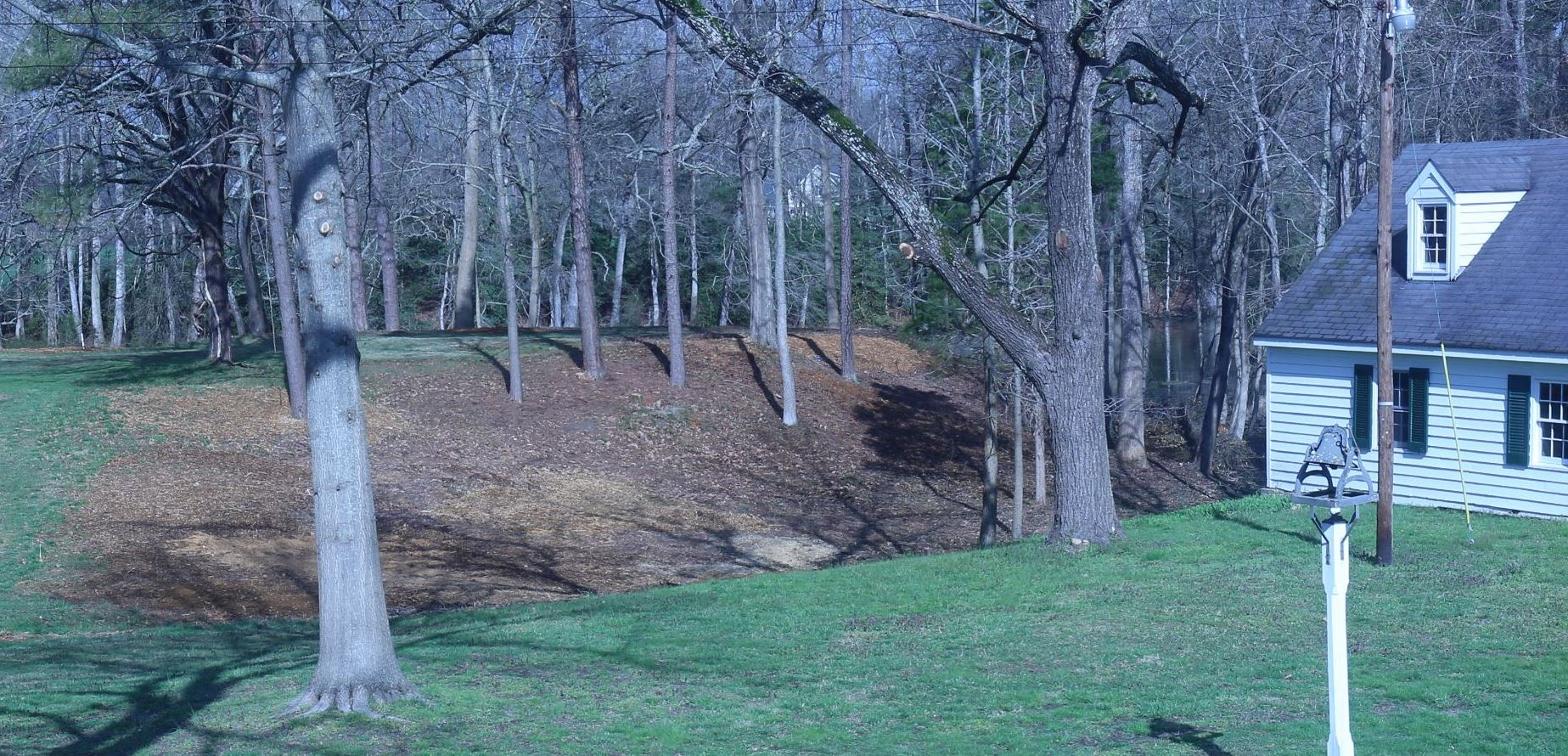
