= Howland Chapel School =

- U.S. National Register of Historic Places
- Virginia Landmarks Register
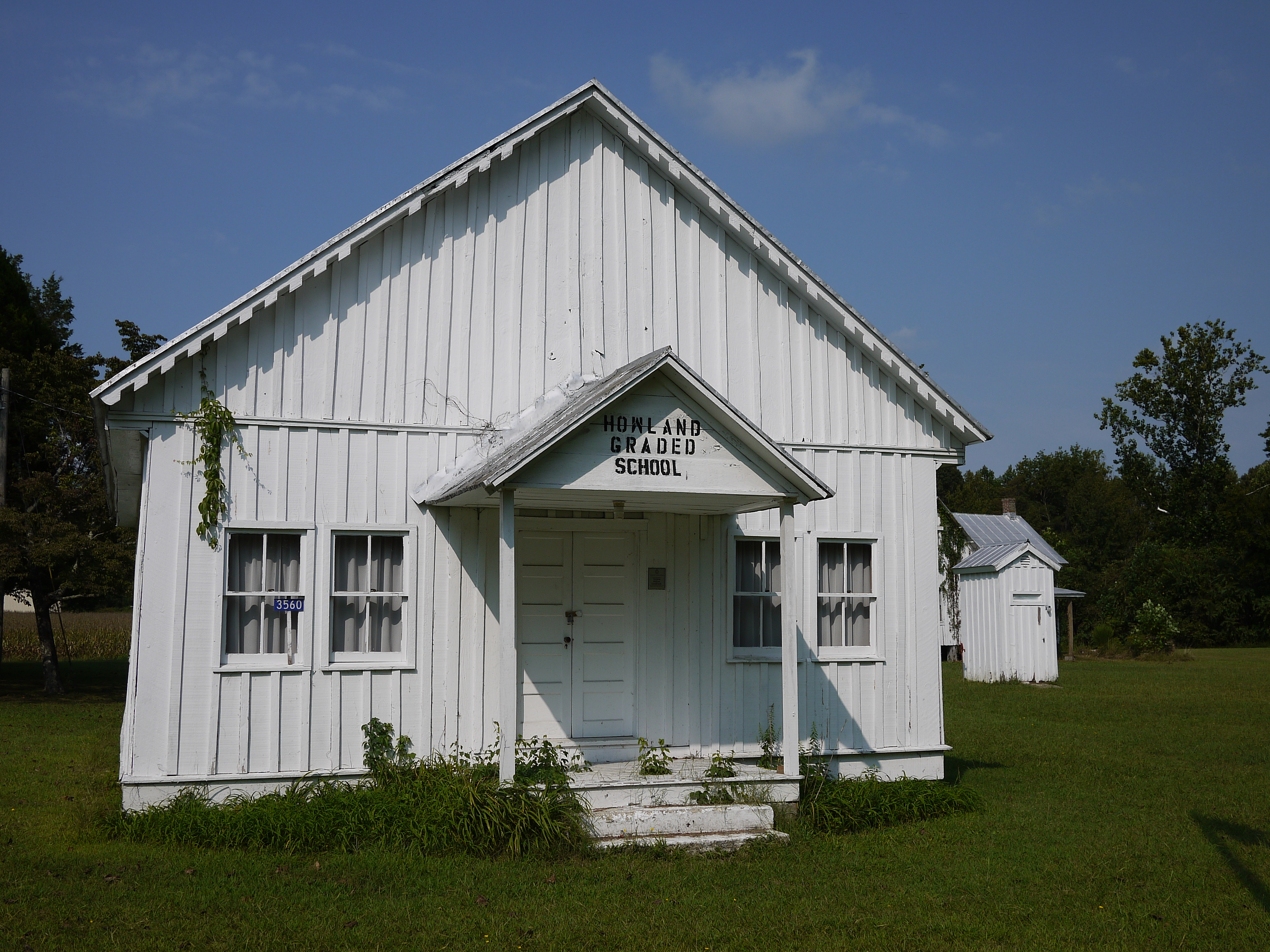
- Howland Chapel School, August 2012

- Location within Virginia Location within the United States
- Location: Jct. of VA 201 and VA 642, Heathsville, Virginia
- Coordinates: 37°52′16″N 76°27′23″W
- Area: 1.6 acres (0.65 ha)
- Built: 1867
- Built by: Emily Howland, Beverly Taliaferro
- Architectural style: Vernacular Gothic Revival
- NRHP reference No.: 90002206
- VLR No.: 066-0110

Significant dates
- Added to NRHP: January 25, 1991
- Designated VLR: June 20, 1989

The Howland Chapel School is a historic school building for African-American students located near Heathsville, Northumberland County, Virginia. It was built in 1867, and is a one-story, gable fronted frame building measuring approximately 26 feet by 40 feet. It features board-and-batten siding and distinctive bargeboards with dentil soffits. The interior has a single room divided by a later central partition formed by sliding, removable doors. The building is a rare, little-altered Reconstruction-era schoolhouse built to serve the children of former slaves. Its construction was funded by New York educator, reformer and philanthropist Emily Howland (1827-1929), for whom the building is named. It was used as a schoolhouse until 1958, and serves as a museum, community center and adult-education facility.

It was listed on the National Register of Historic Places in 1991.
