= St. Stephen's Church (Heathsville, Virginia) =

Historic church in Virginia, United States

- U.S. National Register of Historic Places
- U.S. Historic district – Contributing property
- Virginia Landmarks Register
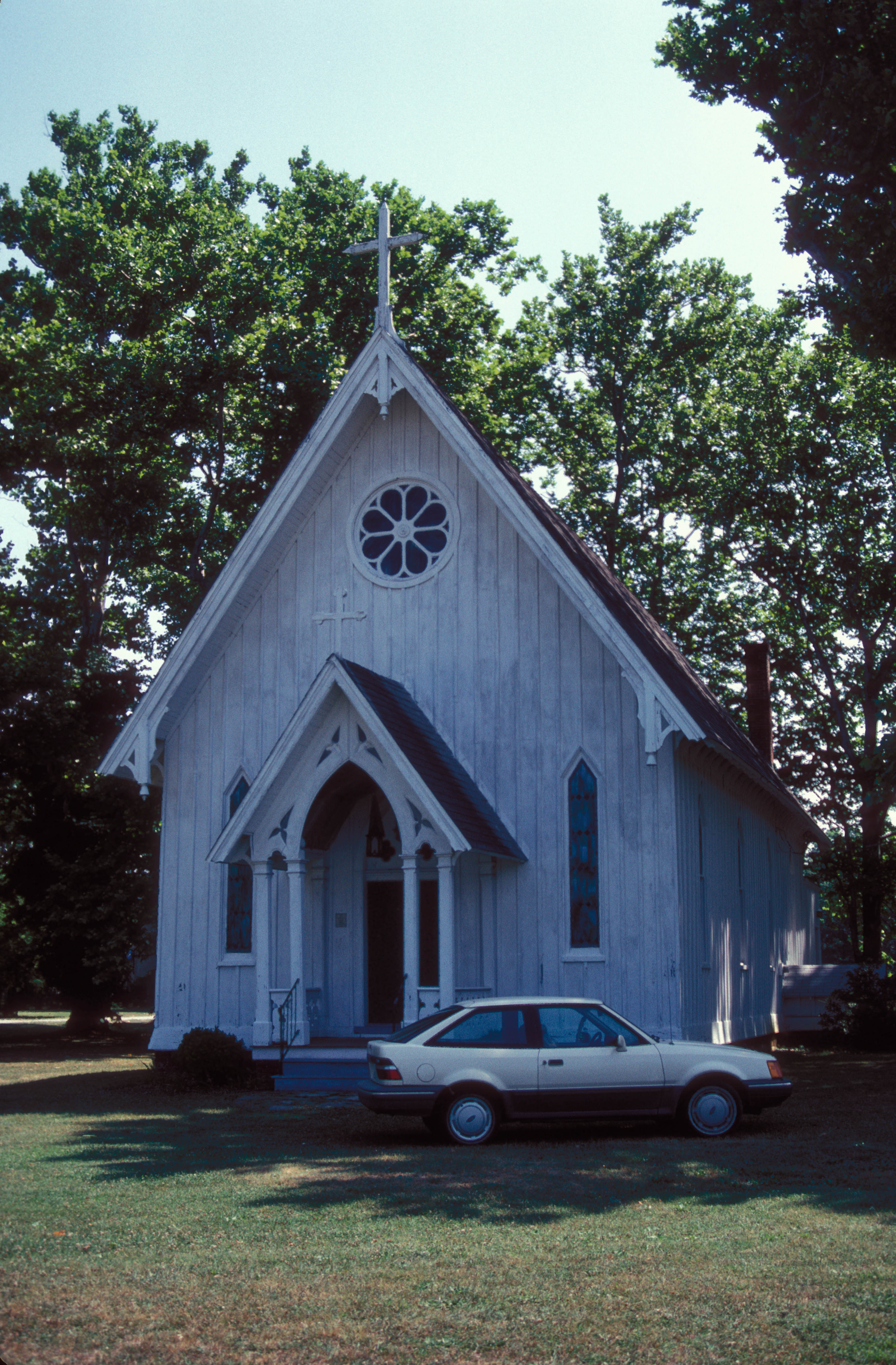
- St. Stephen's Church, March 1971

- Location within Virginia Location within the United States
- Location: 6807 Northumberland Hwy (U.S. Route 360), Heathsville, Virginia
- Coordinates: 37°55′9″N 76°28′26″W
- Area: less than one acre
- Built: 1881
- Architect: T. Buckler Ghequiere
- Architectural style: Carpenter Gothic
- NRHP reference No.: 79003060
- VLR No.: 066-0027

Significant dates
- Added to NRHP: December 28, 1979
- Designated VLR: September 18, 1979

St. Stephen's Church, also known as St. Stephen's Episcopal Church, is an historic church located at 6807 Northumberland Highway, Heathsville, Northumberland County, in the Northern Neck of Virginia. Built in 1874 and consecrated in 1881, it was designed in the Carpenter Gothic style by T. Buckler Ghequiere. On December 28, 1979, it was added to the National Register of Historic Places. It remains in use by an active parish in the Episcopal Diocese of Virginia. It is located in the Heathsville Historic District.

The church sits along U.S. Route 360 in Heathsville. Its main elevation, which faces the west, is dominated by a one-story porch. Its design consists of paired square columns supporting the roof, which is pitched steeply and topped with a cross. Inset is a Gothic-style arch with trefoils and wooden railing; the iron railing on the steps was added later. The double doorway which serves as a church entrance retains its original doors, patterned with a herringbone design and set with quatrefoils of stained glass, set inside a pointed arch. The porch is flanked by more stained glass windows on either side, quite narrow, and a rose window, also of stained glass, is set in the gable. At the very top of the roof is a cross; a finial and pendants make up the decoration of the gable. Inside the church are four bays at each elevation; each contains a stained glass window. The apse may be found in the east of the church; it is rectangular and lighted by three pointed windows, the center one larger than its fellows. A brick chimney on the exterior breaks the shape of the roof. A small vestry may be found beside the apse. A wooden communion rail separates the sanctuary from the nave. The reredos, pulpit, and lectern were constructed by a member of the parish, Clem Goodman. The pews are original. Also surviving is the original church bell, located outside the structure and to its east. The cemetery, behind the church, is a later addition to the grounds. The church design has been called "evidence of rural Virginia's architectural conservatism", as such churches were more likely to have been built earlier in northern states; it also reflects the influence of architect Richard Upjohn and his 1852 book Rural Architecture on many ecclesiastical architects.

The parish was founded in 1653 as Chickacoan Parish; it was renamed Fairfield Parish in 1664. St. Stephen's Parish was formed in 1698, and Fairfield Parish became its lower part; the upper part was formed from an area known to locals as Bowtracy Parish. It was represented in 1785, when the Episcopal Church of Virginia held its first convention, and it sent representatives intermittently to conventions until 1799. It was later disestablished, and its fortunes declined; by 1857 Bishop William Meade could note that there was no active church or parish in the entire county. Renewed interest after the American Civil War led to the purchase of land in 1874 for the purpose of erecting a new church. Materials were shipped down the Chesapeake Bay from Baltimore to build the structure, and it was completed and consecrated in 1881. Notably, the cornerstone states that the original name of the church was Emmanuel Church, but this appears never to have been used.

In 2006, the church was involved in a schism in the Episcopal Church when a majority of its congregants voted to become Anglican and join the Church of Nigeria instead of remaining Episcopalian. Following the schism the majority took the name Light of Christ Anglican Church. Some three dozen of those in the minority left, reforming as St. Stephen's Episcopal Church and meeting in various locations, such as a rented house nearby and a Methodist church. They sued for control of the church building and its related properties, including the parish hall, the cemetery, and a house next door; the suit was resolved in their favor in 2012, and an Episcopal congregation once again occupies the building, having returned on Palm Sunday of that year. The Anglican congregation, which is now part of the Diocese of the Mid-Atlantic of the Anglican Church in North America, meets elsewhere in Heathsville.

The congregation hosts a Strawberry Festival each year.

== Gallery ==
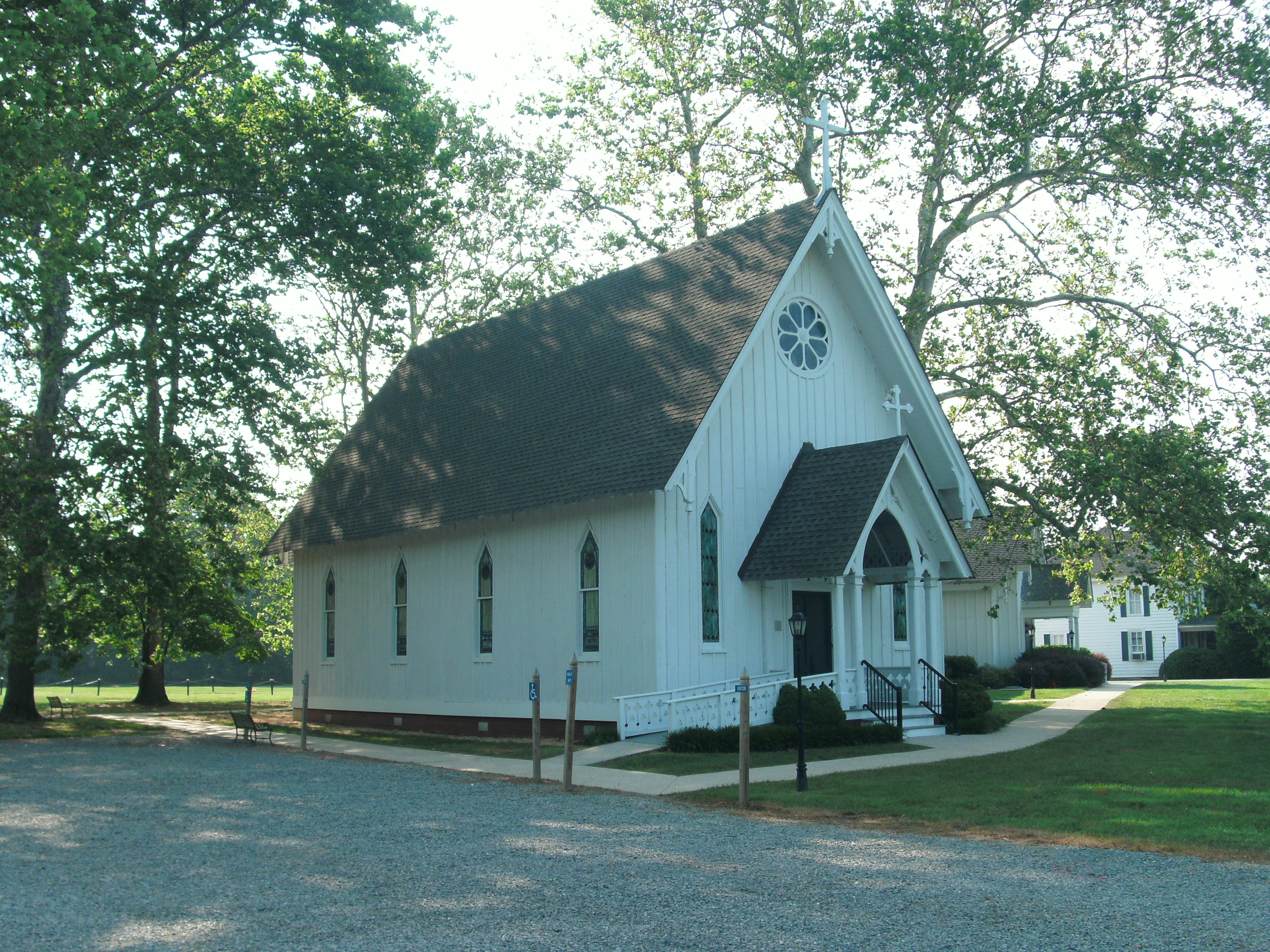
Full view of the church, taken in May 2010

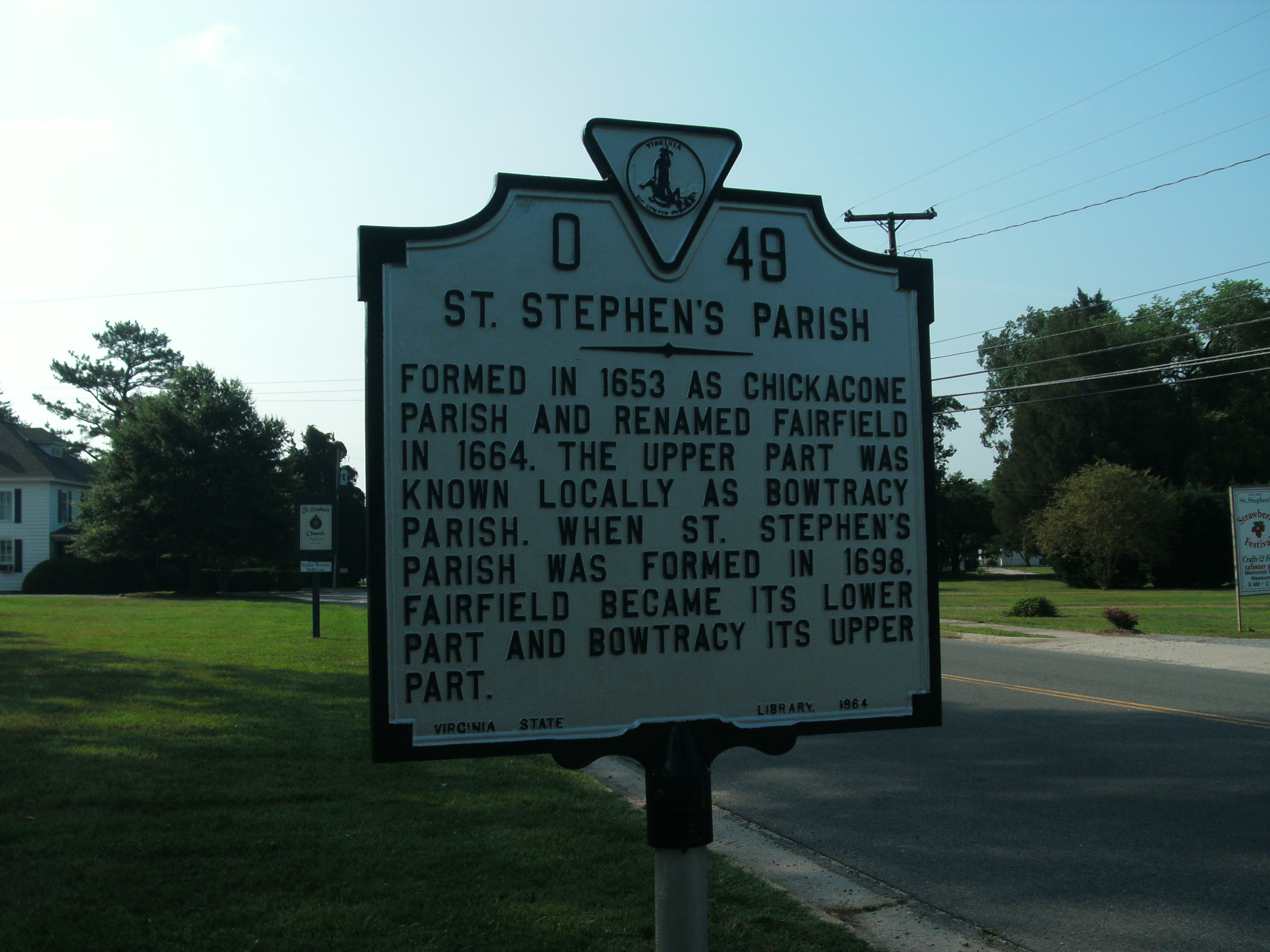
Historical marker at the church

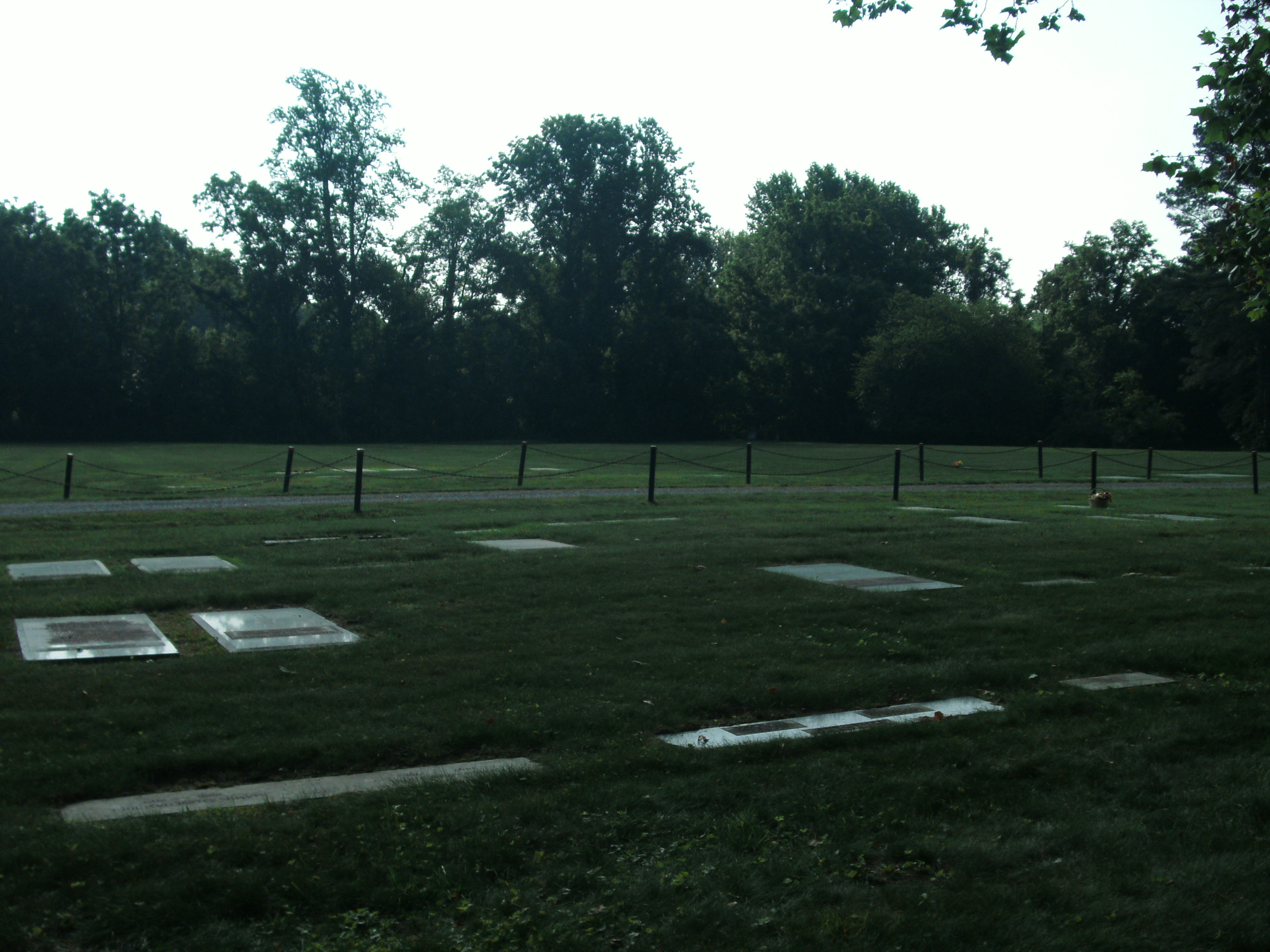
Cemetery behind the church

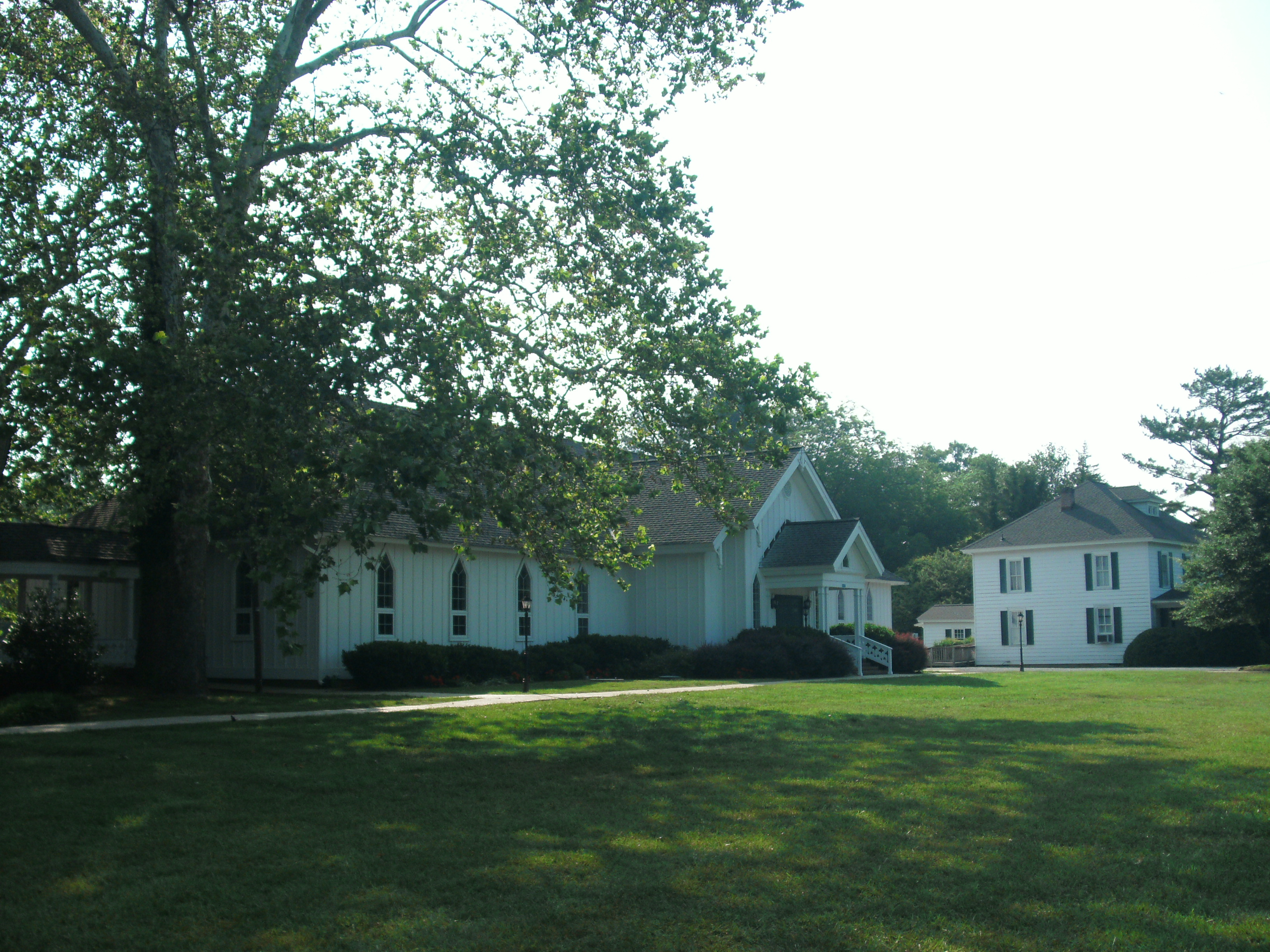
Church parish hall

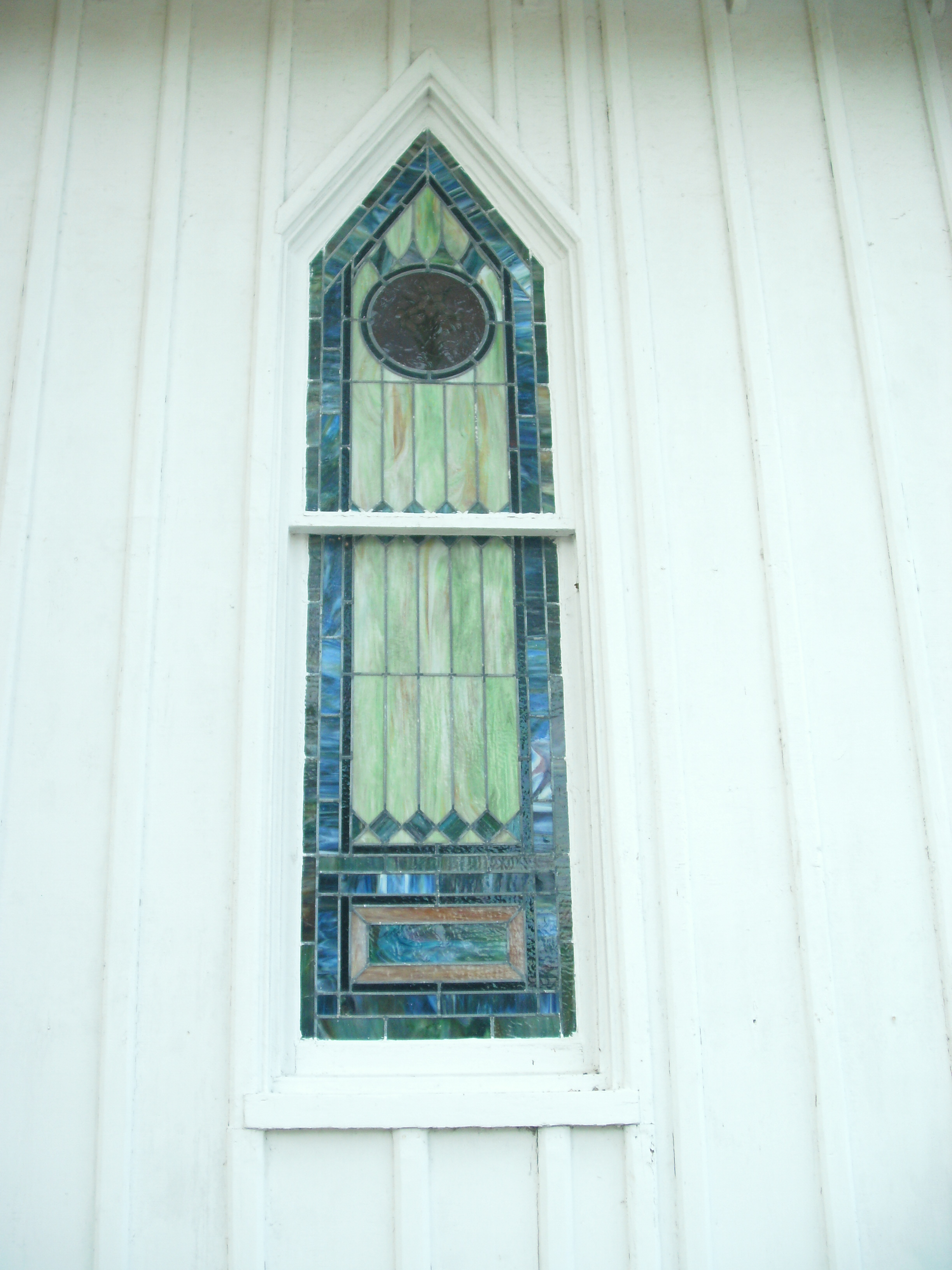
A stained glass window of the church
