= Rice's Hotel =

- U.S. National Register of Historic Places
- U.S. Historic district – Contributing property
- Virginia Landmarks Register
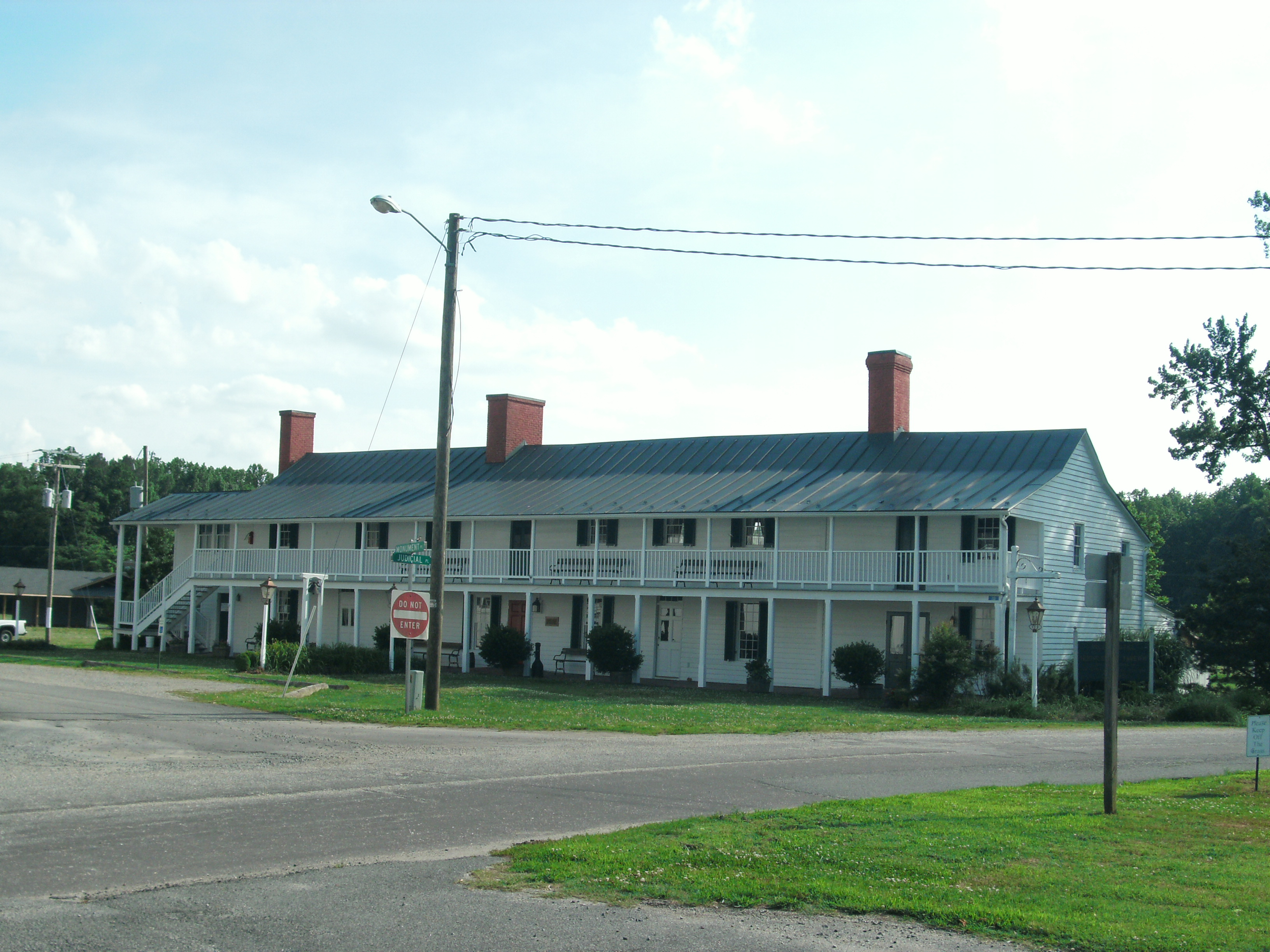
- Rice's Hotel in May, 2010

- Location within Virginia Location within the United States
- Location: Jct. of Co. Rts. 1001 and 1002, Heathsville, Virginia
- Coordinates: 37°55′0″N 76°28′24″W
- Area: 1.2 acres (0.49 ha)
- Built: c. 1795
- Architectural style: Greek Revival, Federal
- NRHP reference No.: 92001389
- VLR No.: 066-0009

Significant dates
- Added to NRHP: October 15, 1992
- Designated VLR: April 22, 1992, December 8, 1993

Now known as Rice's Hotel / Hughlett's Tavern, this "courthouse tavern" was built in stages between the late 1700s and the mid-19th century. Throughout the years, this historic Northern Neck landmark has served as in inn, a tavern, a hotel, apartments, and business offices. The structure is located at Heathsville, Northumberland County, Virginia. It is a two-story, frame building with a 12-bay front and two-tier wooden piazza and Federal style interior.

It is perhaps the largest traditional tavern in any Virginia town east of Fredericksburg and north of Gloucester Court House. The building closed in the late 1970s, and was subsequently donated to the Northumberland County Historical Society.

It was listed on the National Register of Historic Places in 1992. It is located in the Heathsville Historic District at 73 Monument Place, located behind the old Northumberland Courthouse.

Today, Rice's Hotel / Hughlett's Tavern is operated by an all-volunteer foundation, Rice's Hotel / Hughlett's Tavern Foundation Inc., and has become a major tourist attraction. It is home to four artisan guilds: the Blacksmith Guild, the Quilt Guild, the Woodworkers Guild, and the Spinners & Weavers Guild.

The Tavern houses the "Heritage Arts Center Gift Shoppe, which sells the guilds' output, plus wares made by over 70 other local artists and artisans. A portion of the building also includes the Tavern Café, which is entirely run by the volunteers of the Tavern's new Culinary Guild. The gift shoppe and café are open Thursday thru Saturday, 10 a.m. to 2 p.m.

The Tavern Foundation also offers heritage arts classes in such traditional skills as blacksmithing, weaving, spinning, quilting, woodworking, and basket-making. Rice's Hotel / Hughlett's Tavern sponsors the Heathsville Farmers Market on the third Saturday, April thru October, 9 a.m. to 1 p.m.

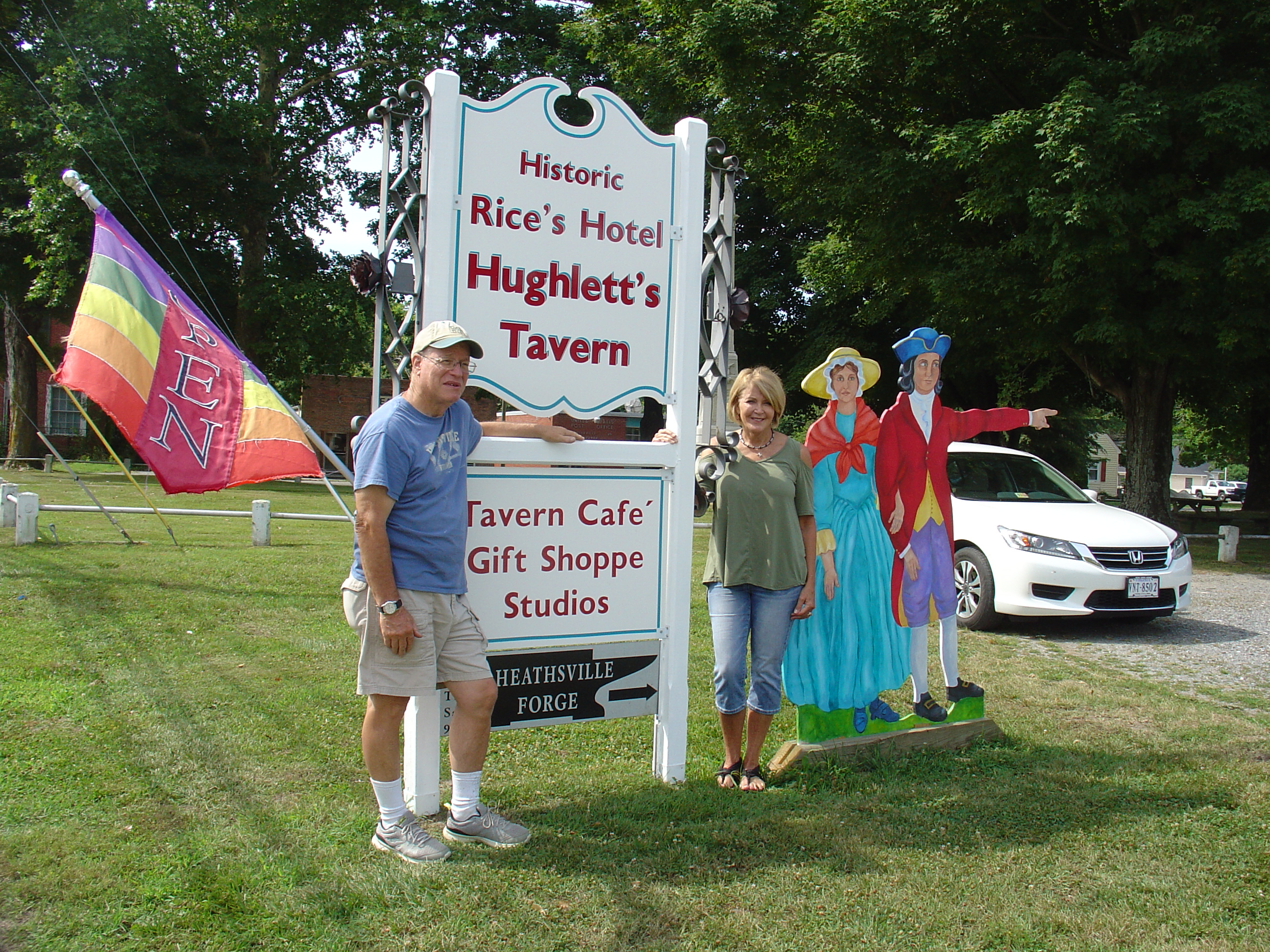
Look for the "colonial couple" on the side of the road to find Rice's Hotel / Hughlett's Tavern, which is hidden just off Route 360 in Heathsville behind the old Northumberland Courthouse.
