= Kirkland Grove Campground =

Historic building in Virginia

- U.S. National Register of Historic Places
- Virginia Landmarks Register
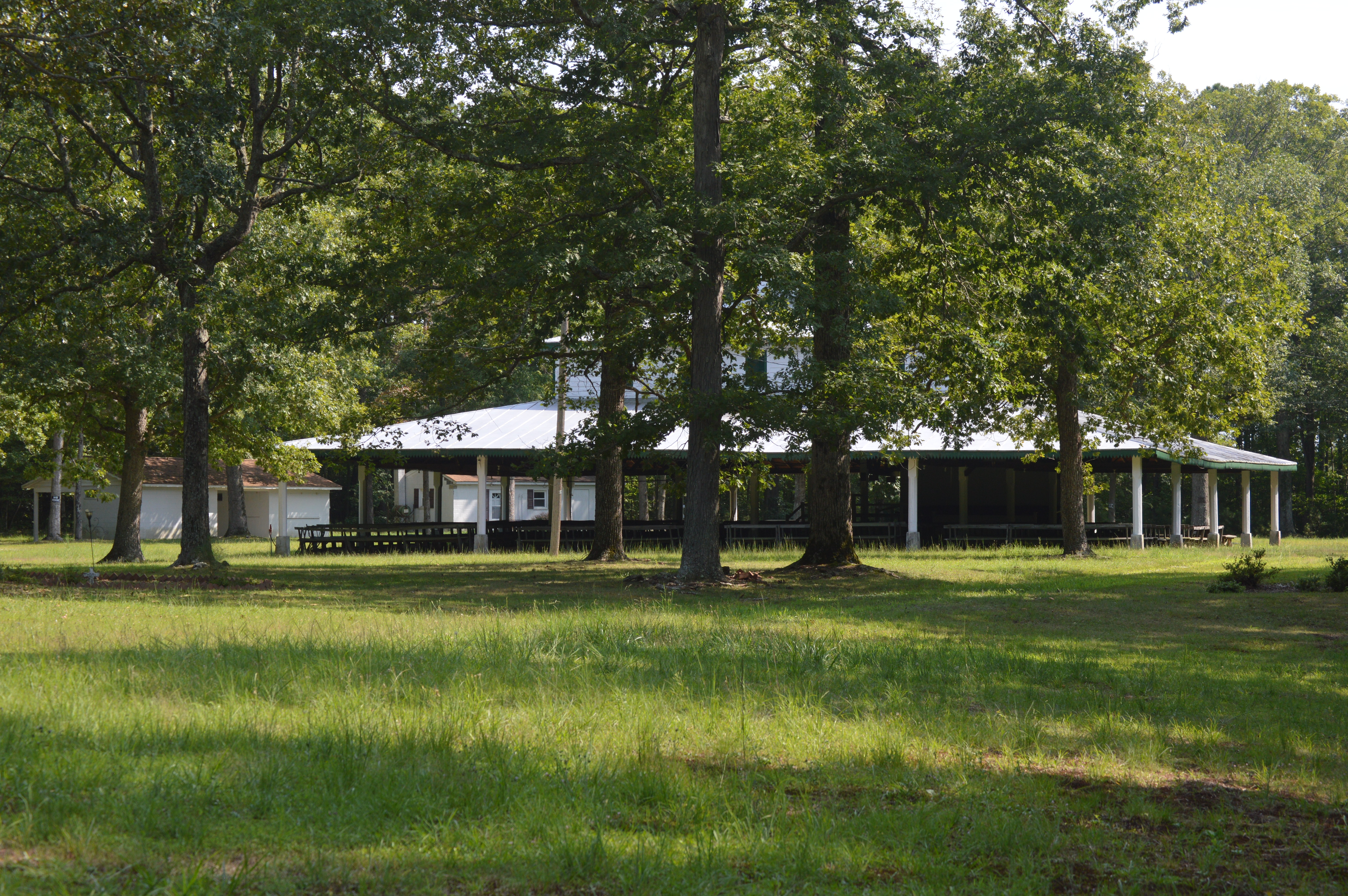
- Campground overview with the Tabernacle

- Location within Virginia Location within the United States
- Location: VA 779, 1.6 mi. S of Heathsville, near Heathsville, Virginia
- Coordinates: 37°54′02″N 76°29′9″W
- Area: 23.5 acres (9.5 ha)
- Built: 1892
- Built by: William Dandridge Cockrell
- NRHP reference No.: 92001391
- VLR No.: 066-0089

Significant dates
- Added to NRHP: October 15, 1992
- Designated VLR: December 11, 1991

Kirkland Grove Campground is a historic Baptist campground located near Heathsville, Northumberland County, Virginia. It was established in 1892, and was the site of week-long religious services. The main building is the great Tabernacle, built in 1892. It measures 90 feet square and supported by timber columns supporting a standing seam metal hipped roof. The roof has four square tiers rising from the center, each tier growing smaller toward the top. The two other contributing buildings are the Camper's Tent and Preacher's Tent, both built in 1892. The property continues to be used for church meetings, revivals, reunions, and youth camp activities.

Listed on the Virginia Landmarks Register in late 1991, it was subsequently included in the National Register of Historic Places in 1992.
