= Sunnyside (Heathsville, Virginia) =

Historic house in Virginia, United States

- U.S. National Register of Historic Places
- U.S. Historic district – Contributing property
- Virginia Landmarks Register
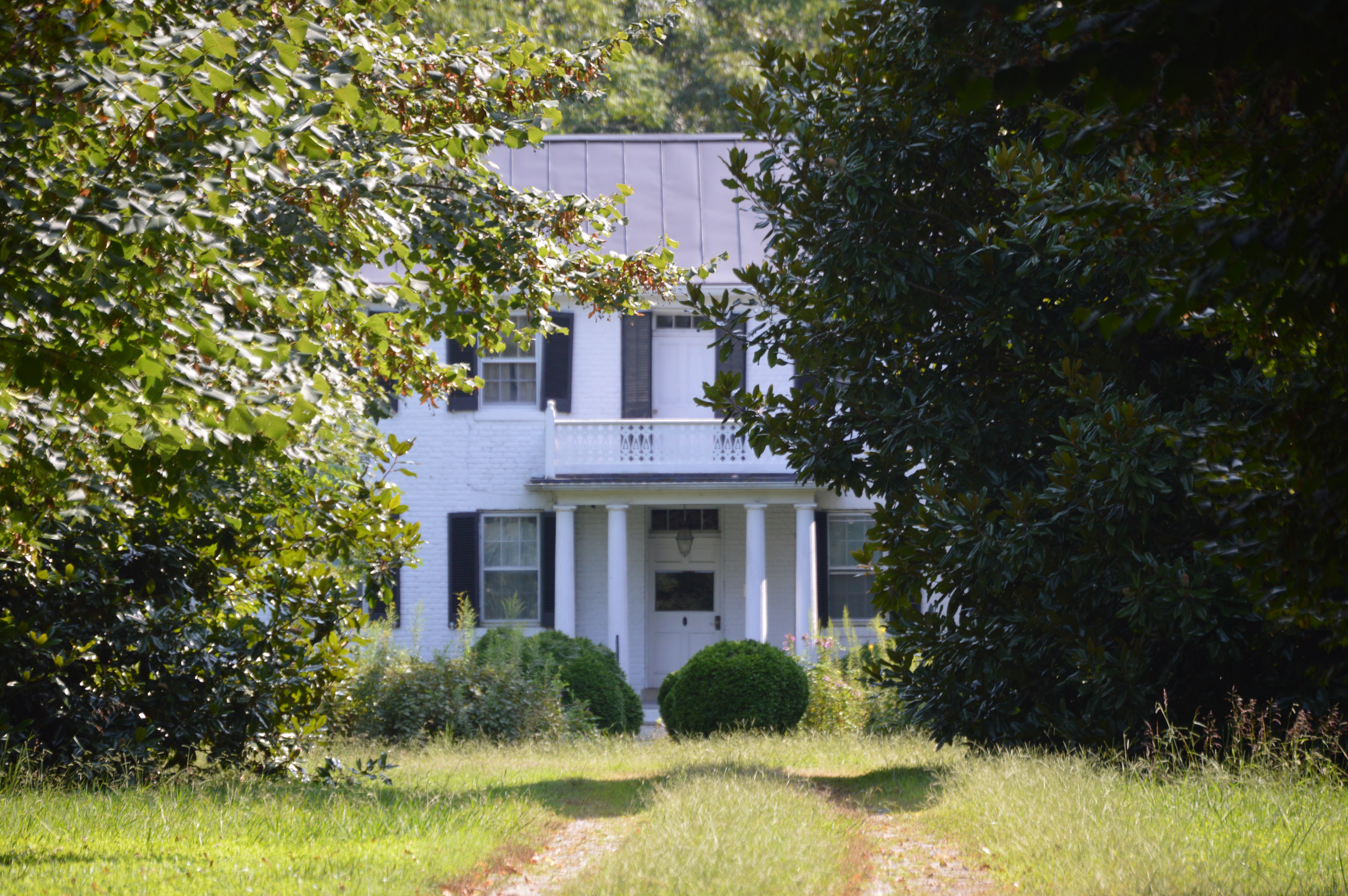
- Roadside view of the entrance

- Location within Virginia Location within the United States
- Location: Southern side of U.S. Route 360 east of its junction with State Route 201 at Heathsville, Virginia
- Coordinates: 37°54′52″N 76°28′3″W
- Area: 3 acres (1.2 ha)
- Built: c. 1822
- Architectural style: Federal
- NRHP reference No.: 96000580
- VLR No.: 066-0055

Significant dates
- Added to NRHP: May 23, 1996
- Designated VLR: October 18, 1995

Sunnyside is a historic plantation house located at Heathsville, Northumberland County, Virginia. It was built about 1822, and is a two-story, single-pile, central-passage-plan Federal style brick I-house. It is topped by a gabled standing seam metal roof and has a two-story kitchen addition and a two-story rear addition. The front facade features a one-story, flat-roofed portico featuring paired Doric order columns. Also on the property are the contributing former smokehouse, dairy, guest house (formerly a kitchen), carriage house, corn crib, and barn. It is located in the Heathsville Historic District.

It was listed on the National Register of Historic Places in 1996.
