= Heathsville, Virginia =

Heathsville
- Census-designated place (CDP)
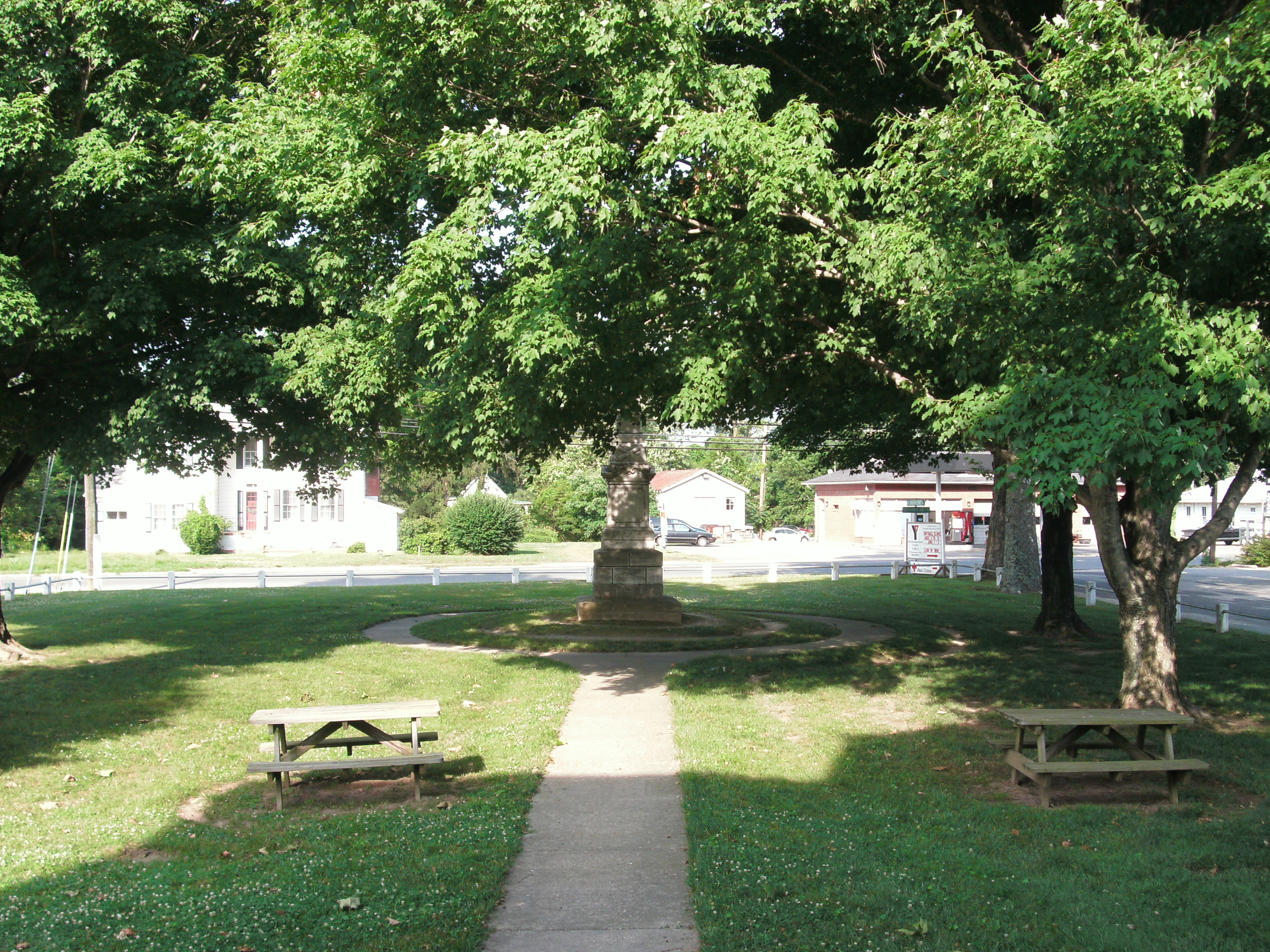
- The village green, from the porch of the Northumberland County Courthouse

- Location within the state of Virginia Heathsville (the United States)
- Coordinates: 37°55′3″N 76°28′20″W
- Country: United States
- State: Virginia
- County: Northumberland

Population (2020)
  - Total: 136
- Time zone: UTC−5 (Eastern (EST))
  - Summer (DST): UTC−4 (EDT)
- ZIP Code: 22473
- Area code: 804

Heathsville is a census-designated place (CDP) in and the county seat of Northumberland County, Virginia, United States. Heathsville is in the easternmost county of the Northern Neck of Virginia, which was the birthplace of three of the first five Presidents of the United States - George Washington, James Madison and James Monroe. It is the county seat of Northumberland County, and has housed four county courthouses since the first was built in 1663.

It is also home to numerous historical home sites, some dating to the late 18th century. The Heathsville Historic District, Coan Baptist Church, Howland Chapel School, Kirkland Grove Campground, Rice's Hotel, Oakley, St. Stephen's Church, Sunnyside, and The Academy are listed on the National Register of Historic Places. Heathsville is named after lawyer and politician John Heath.

The population as of the 2020 Census was 136. It is located on U.S. Route 360 (the Northumberland Highway) west of Reedville and east of Warsaw.

== History ==
In 1679, the county justices of Northumberland County sought to move their courthouse from the Hull Neck area to a more central locale in the county. To that end, local officials signed a contract with John Hughlett in 1680 to build a court house and attached prison upon "Mr. Hughlett's Indian Field," the future site of Heathsville. The court house would be completed the following year.

For most of its early history, Heathsville remained a small hamlet, with fewer than 12 buildings through the American Revolutionary War. These buildings were small, poorly maintained wooden homes that one 1784 court order described as a "public nuisance."

However, the town continued to grow, and several influential residents of the county successfully petitioned the Virginia General Assembly to incorporate Northumberland Court House as a town in 1797; this group included John Heath, for whom the town was named. In 1798, Anglo-American architect Benjamin Henry Latrobe surveyed the new town of Heathsville and divided it into 40 lots. By the early nineteenth century, Heathsville had continued its expansion, with one chronicler describing it as "a handsome post-village" with "a large church, an academy, and a mill." It was during this time in Heathsville's history that many of its historic homes (Sunnyside, Springfield, The Academy, and others) were built and expanded.

Eventually, the Civil War would dampen Heathsville's continued growth, but the town largely recovered from the conflict by 1880. In 1873, an association of local women erected a new statue to the fallen soldiers of the Confederacy. Unlike many similar monuments, it did not feature a soldier, but a woman holding an anchor, symbolizing how the area's women served as an "anchor" for the community during the Civil War.

Despite the area's geographical isolation, continued steamboat travel around the Northern Neck kept the town accessible during the postbellum years, but steamboat service was suspended in 1937. Also during this time, the pressures of urbanization and the Great Depression led many young residents away from Heathsville's farms and to more populated areas for employment. As the town's grist-milling, distilling, and wagon-making industries died out, the area became increasingly reliant on its courthouse to compensate for its lack of manufacturing.

Today, Heathsville's population continues to shrink, having lost over one-quarter of its population since 1980. The local Chamber of Commerce describes Heathsville as "based in the 18th century but living in the 21st." The area behind the old courthouse is home to a farmer's market the third Saturday of each month from April through October. This area also hosts craft guilds dedicated to the preservation and use of pre-industrial skills, including iron forging, wood working, quilting, and weaving.

== Demographics ==
Heathsville was first listed as a census designated place in the 2010 U.S. census.

Racial composition as of 2020(NH = Non-Hispanic)
Race / Ethnicity	Pop 2020	% 2020
White alone (NH)	106	77.94%
Black or African American alone (NH)	18	13.23%
Native American or Alaska Native alone (NH)	0	0.00%
Asian alone (NH)	2	1.47%
Pacific Islander alone (NH)	0	0.00%
Some Other Race alone (NH)	1	0.74%
Mixed Race/Multi-Racial (NH)	7	5.15%
Hispanic or Latino (any race)	2	1.47%
Total	136	100.00%

Note: the US Census treats Hispanic/Latino as an ethnic category. This table excludes Latinos from the racial categories and assigns them to a separate category. Hispanics/Latinos can be of any race.

Historical population
Census	Pop.	Note	%±
1980	185		—
1990	127		−31.4%
2000	142		11.8%
2010	142		0.0%
2020	136		−4.2%
U.S. Decennial Census; 2010 2020
