= Oakley (Heathsville, Virginia) =

Historic house in Virginia, United States

- U.S. National Register of Historic Places
- U.S. Historic district – Contributing property
- Virginia Landmarks Register
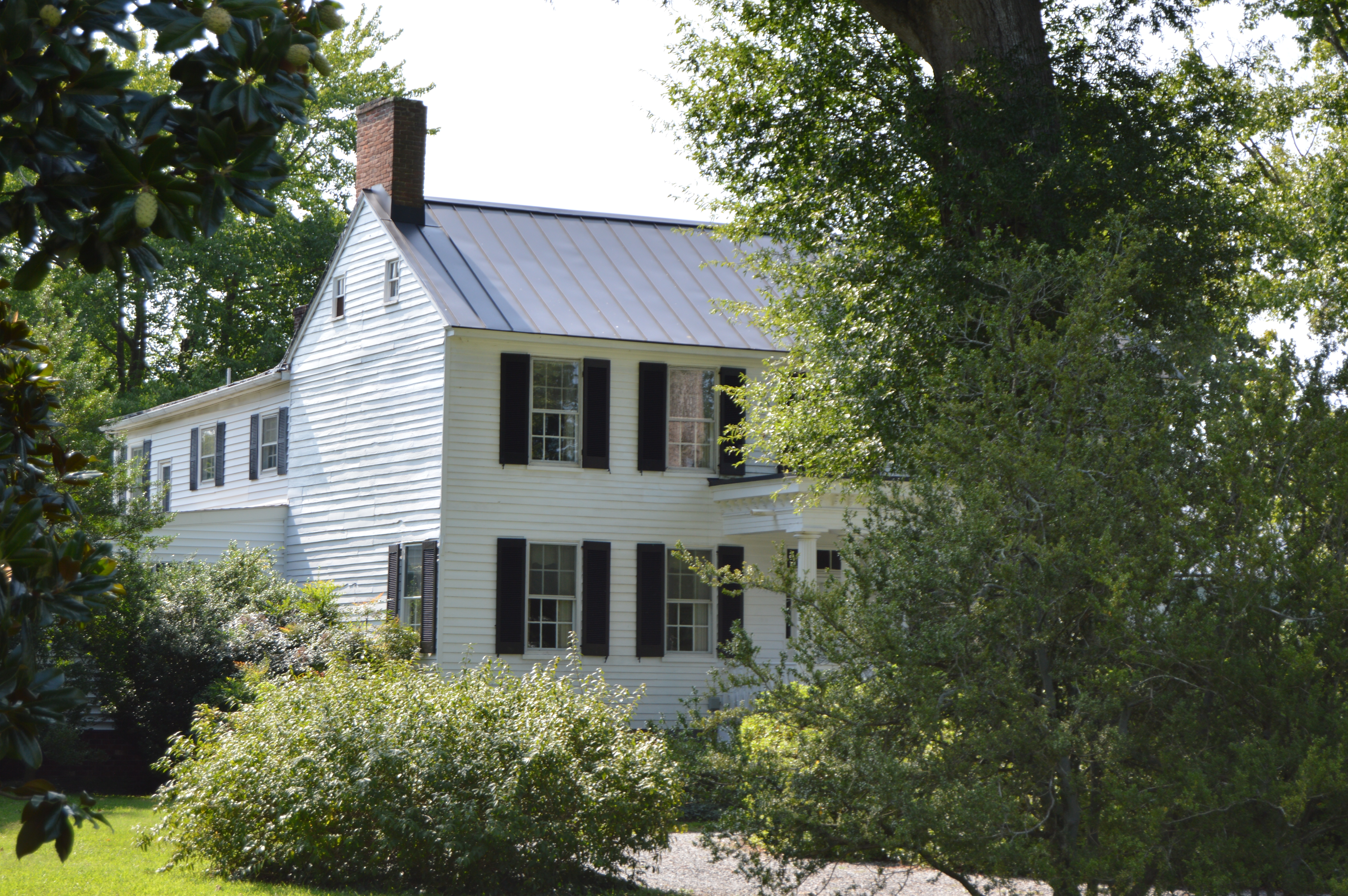
- Front and southern side

- Location within Virginia Location within the United States
- Location: 28 Back St., Heathsville, Virginia
- Coordinates: 37°55′5″N 76°28′28″W
- Area: 28 acres (11 ha)
- Built: c. 1820, 1898, 1978
- Architectural style: Federal
- NRHP reference No.: 99000073
- VLR No.: 066-0053

Significant dates
- Added to NRHP: January 27, 1999
- Designated VLR: December 10, 1998

Oakley is a historic plantation house located at Heathsville, Northumberland County, Virginia. It was built about 1820, and is a 2 1/2-story, five-bay, Federal style frame dwelling. It is topped by a gabled standing seam metal roof. A frame two-story ell was added in 1898 and a one-story, glass-enclosed porch in 1978. The front facade features a one-story, tetrastyle porch. Also on the property are the contributing massive frame barn and 19th century frame shed. It is located in the Heathsville Historic District. The house was owned for a time by C. Harding Walker, a notable state politician, and his family.

It was listed on the National Register of Historic Places in 1999.
