= Wicomico Church, Virginia =

Unincorporated community in Virginia, US

Coordinates: 37°48′54″N 76°22′40″W

Wicomico Church is an unincorporated community in Northumberland County, in the U.S. state of Virginia.

Shalango was listed on the National Register of Historic Places in 1986.
