= Shalango =

Historic house in Virginia, United States

- U.S. National Register of Historic Places
- Virginia Landmarks Register
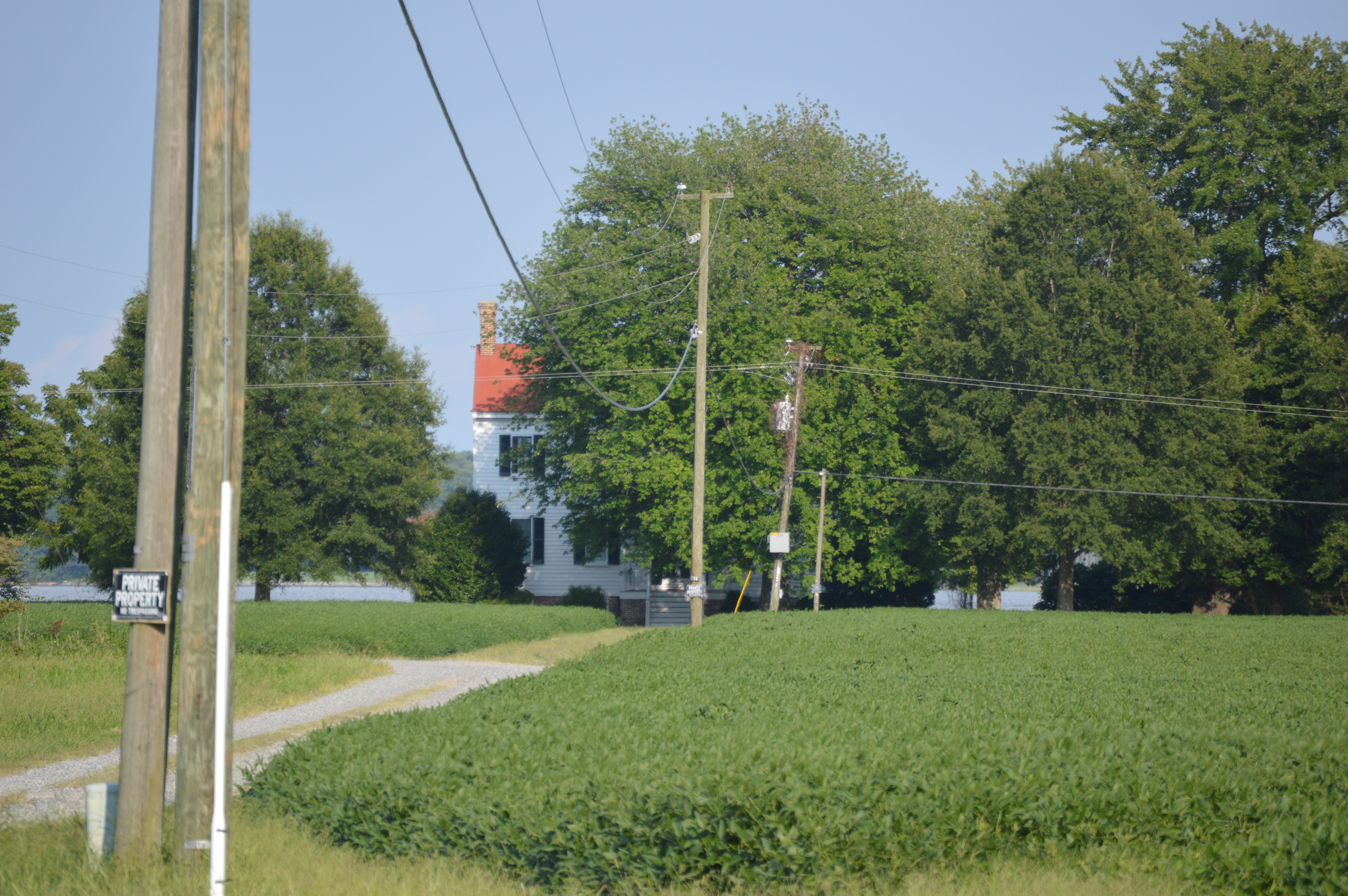
- Roadside view of the house

- Location within Virginia Location within the United States
- Location: Sandy Point Road, Wicomico Church, Virginia
- Coordinates: 37°49′26″N 76°19′14″W
- Area: 25 acres (10 ha)
- Built: 1855-1856
- Architectural style: I-house
- NRHP reference No.: 86003135
- VLR No.: 066-0088

Significant dates
- Added to NRHP: November 6, 1986
- Designated VLR: April 15, 1986

Shalango is a historic plantation house located at Wicomico Church, Northumberland County, Virginia. It was built in 1855–1856, and is a large 2 1/2-story, five-bay, I-house frame dwelling. It has a single-pile, central-passage plan and interior end chimneys. The house stands on a tall brick basement and is covered with a gable roof pierced by three dormers on either slope. The front facade features a one-story late 19th-century porch with scroll-sawn decoration.

It was listed on the National Register of Historic Places in 1986.
