= Heathsville Historic District =

Historic district in Virginia, United States

- U.S. National Register of Historic Places
- U.S. Historic district
- Virginia Landmarks Register
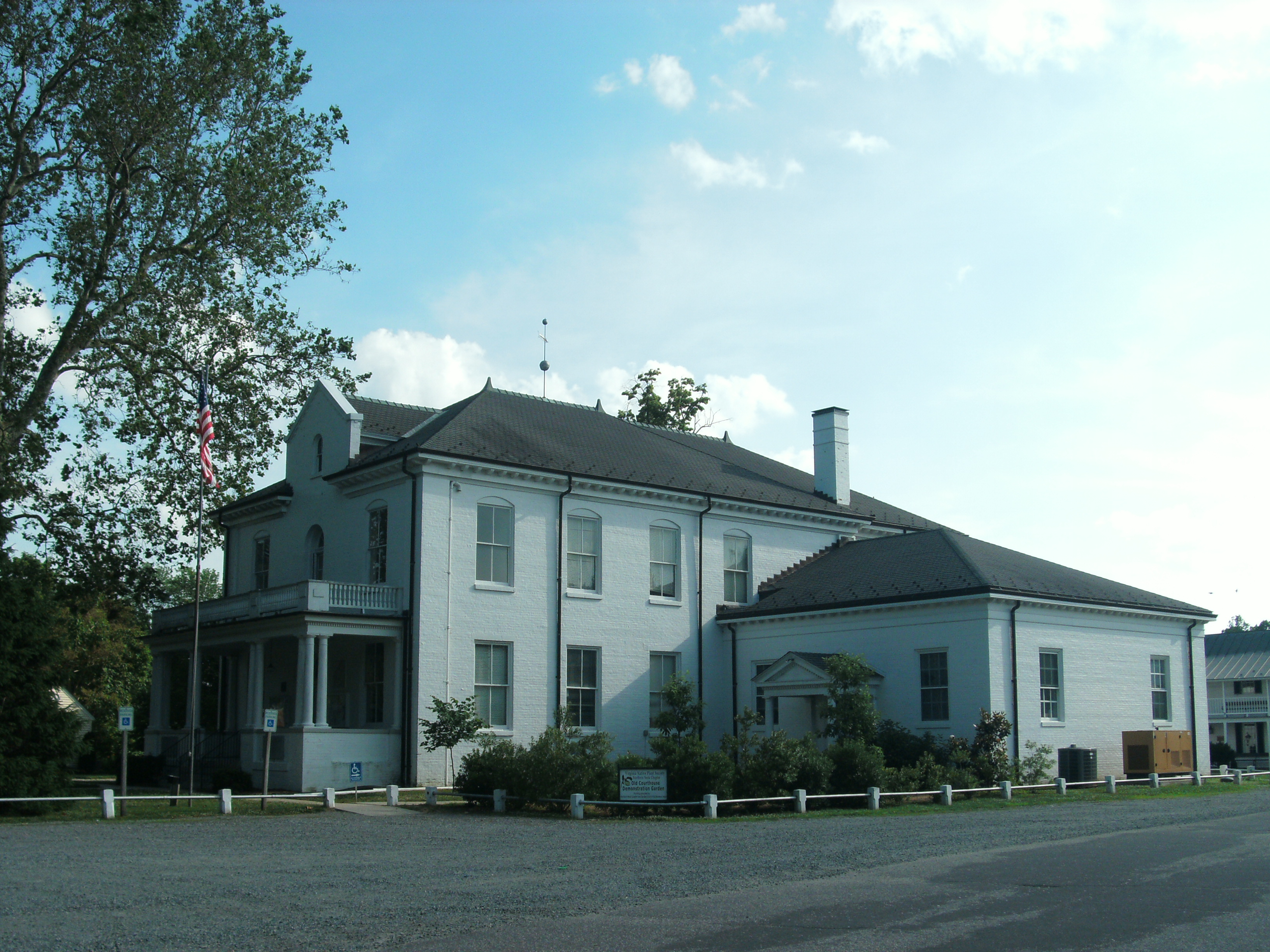
- Northumberland County Courthouse, May 2010

- Location within Virginia Location within the United States
- Location: US 360 at jct. with VA 634 and VA 201, Heathsville, Virginia
- Coordinates: 37°55′07″N 76°28′23″W
- Area: 112 acres (45 ha)
- Built: 1798
- Architect: Multiple
- Architectural style: Greek Revival, Federal, Italianate
- NRHP reference No.: 92000053
- VLR No.: 066-0101

Significant dates
- Added to NRHP: February 26, 1992
- Designated VLR: December 11, 1991

Heathsville Historic District is a national historic district located at Heathsville, Northumberland County, Virginia. The district includes 81 contributing buildings, 12 contributing sites, 4 contributing structures, and 4 contributing objects in the county seat of Northumberland County. It is an assemblage of residential, commercial, and government buildings dating from the 18th through 20th centuries in a variety of popular architectural styles. The linear district is centered on the courthouse square. Notable buildings include the Northumberland Court House (1851, 1900–1901), the old county jail (1844), the former Methodist Protestant Church (c. 1855–60), Harding House, Belleville, Heathsville Masonic Lodge No. 109 (1894), Bank of Northumberland (1924), and the Heathsville United Methodist Church (1894). Located in the district and separately listed are Rice's Hotel, Oakley, St. Stephen's Church, Sunnyside, and The Academy.

It was listed on the National Register of Historic Places in 1992.
