= Springfield (Heathsville, Virginia) =

Historic house in Virginia, United States

- U.S. National Register of Historic Places
- Virginia Landmarks Register
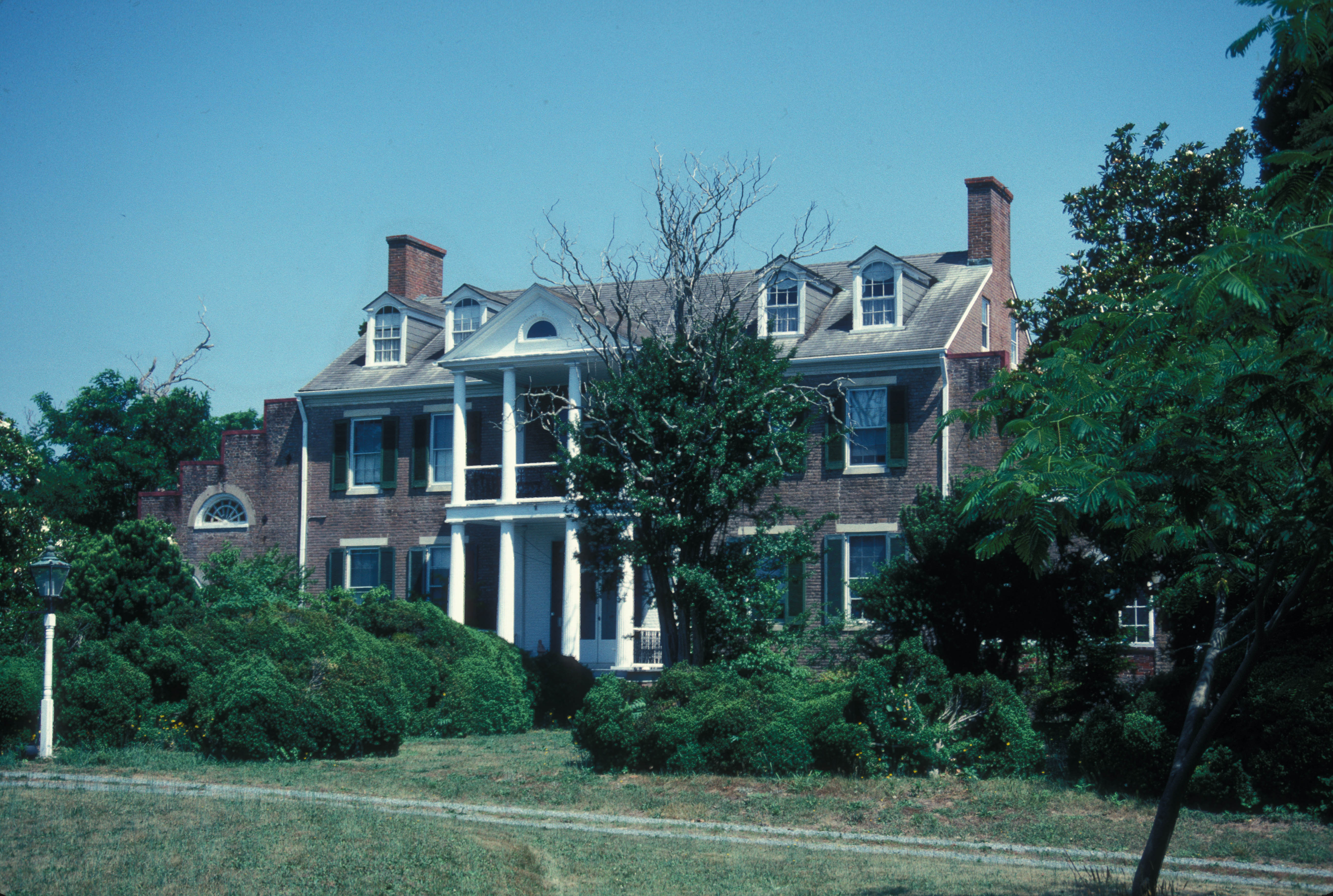
- Springfield, March 1971

- Location within Virginia Location within the United States
- Location: SR 360, near Heathsville, Virginia
- Coordinates: 37°55′24″N 76°28′52″W
- Area: 29 acres (12 ha)
- Built: 1828-1830, 1850
- Architectural style: Greek Revival, Federal, Roman Revival
- NRHP reference No.: 79003059
- VLR No.: 066-0011

Significant dates
- Added to NRHP: December 23, 1979
- Designated VLR: September 18, 1979

Springfield is a historic plantation house located near Heathsville, Northumberland County, Virginia. It was built between 1828 and 1830, and is a 2 1/2-story, Federal-style brick mansion with a central-hall plan house covered by a gable roof. It has 1 1/2-story, stepped-gable wings containing round-arched windows. It was enlarged and renovated in the 1850s, with the addition of Greek Revival style design elements. The house features a pedimented two-level tetrastyle portico with fluted columns.

It was listed on the National Register of Historic Places in 1979.
