= Burgess, Virginia =

Unincorporated community in Virginia, United States

Coordinates: 37°52′54″N 76°20′42″W

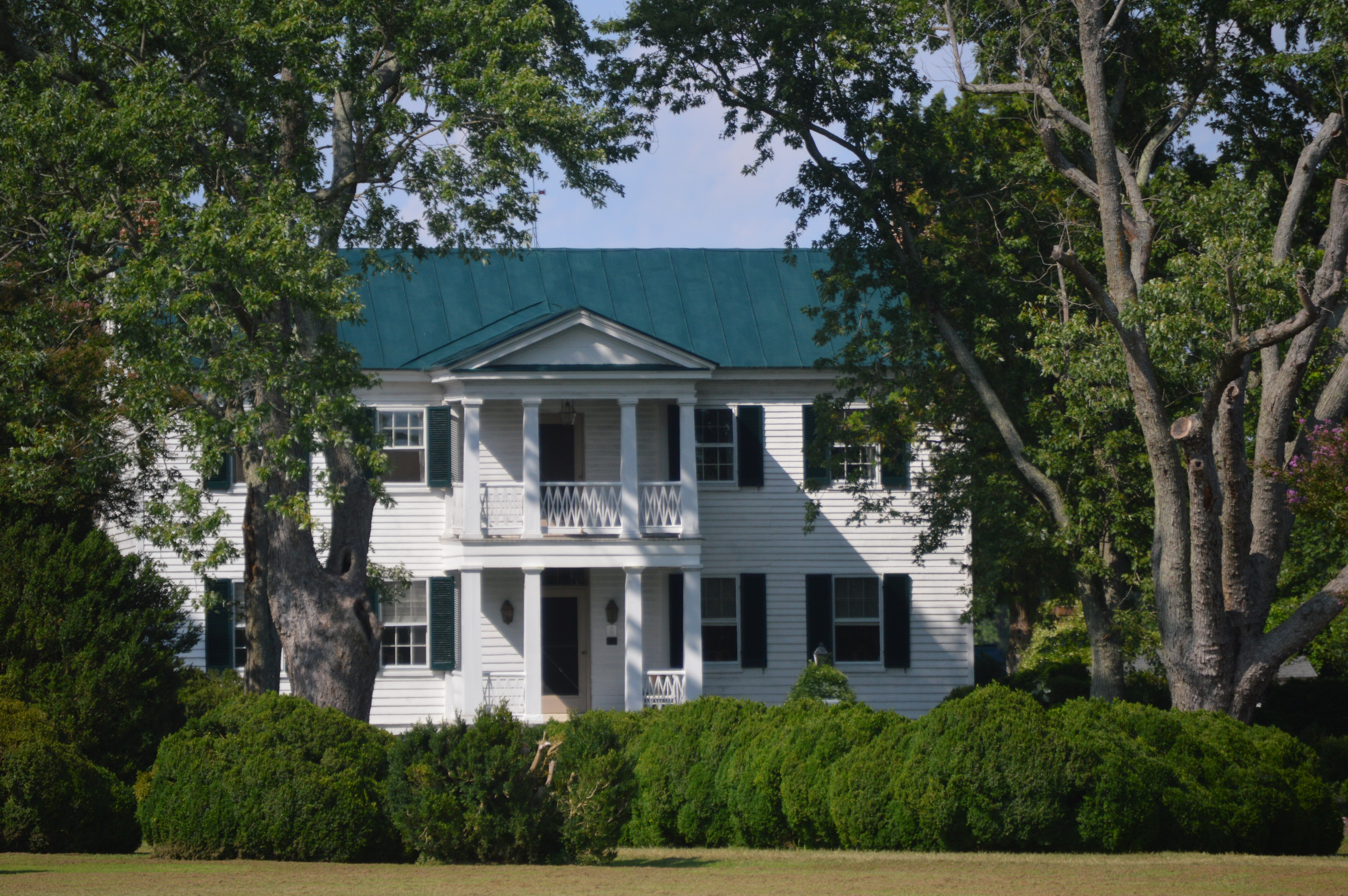
The Versailles farmhouse on U.S. Route 360

Burgess is an unincorporated community in Northumberland County, in the U.S. state of Virginia. The ZIP Code is 22432.

Versailles was listed on the National Register of Historic Places in 1997.
