= The Academy (Heathsville, Virginia) =

Historic house in Virginia, United States

- U.S. National Register of Historic Places
- U.S. Historic district – Contributing property
- Virginia Landmarks Register
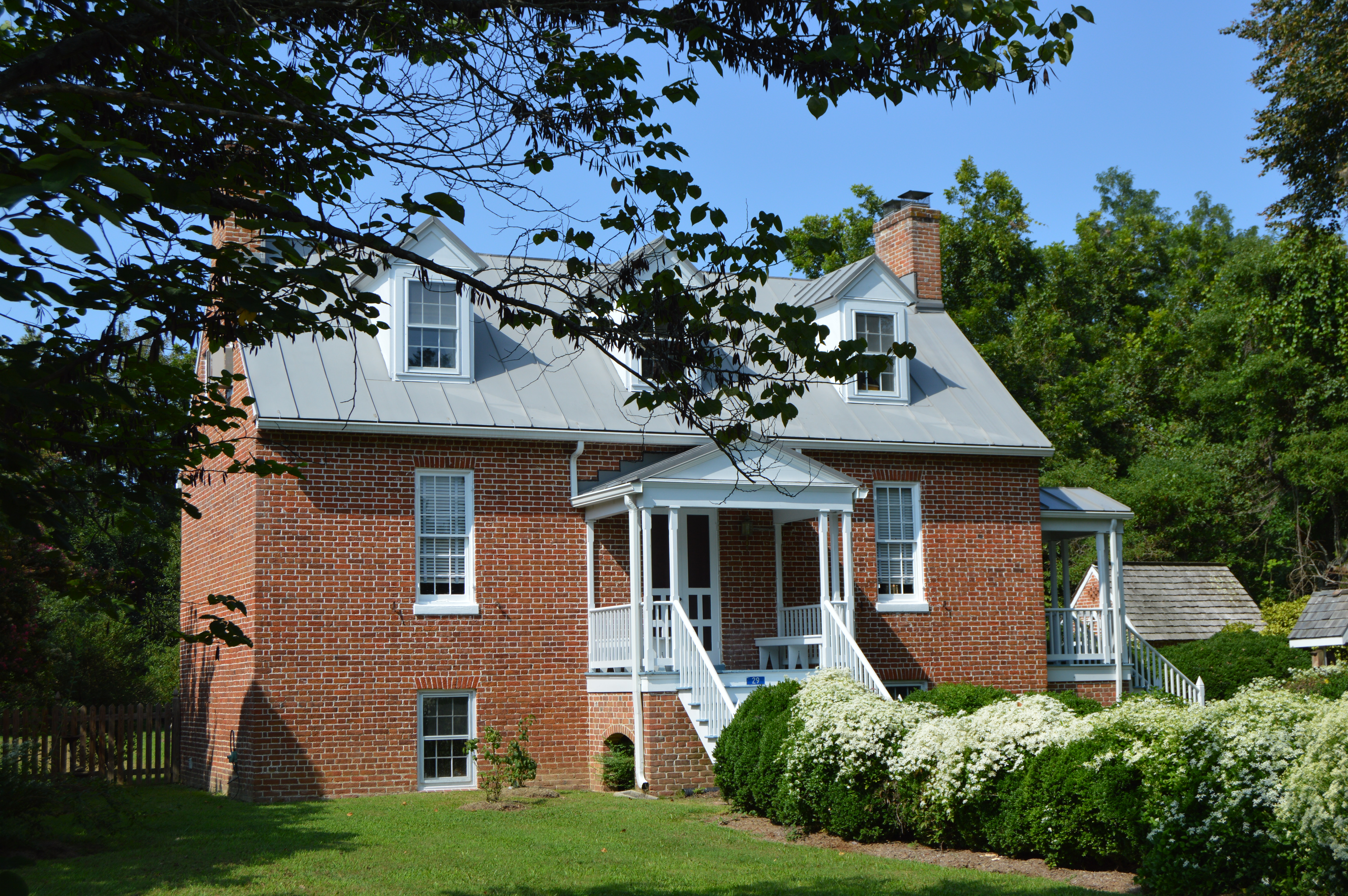
- Front of the house

- Location within Virginia Location within the United States
- Location: Junction of Main St. and St. Stephen's Ln., Heathsville, Virginia
- Coordinates: 37°55′24″N 76°28′52″W
- Area: 1.1 acres (0.45 ha)
- Built: 1800
- Architectural style: Federal
- NRHP reference No.: 97001400
- VLR No.: 066-0176

Significant dates
- Added to NRHP: November 18, 1997
- Designated VLR: September 17, 1997

The Academy is a historic home located at Heathsville, Northumberland County, Virginia. It was built about 1800, and is a 1½-story, brick house in the Tidewater Federal style. It is topped by a gabled standing seam metal roof. The interior preserves a large quantity of original woodwork including the original stair. Also on the property are the contributing early-19th century brick smokehouse and a barn (1929). The house was restored between 1994 and 1997. It is located in the Heathsville Historic District.

It was listed on the National Register of Historic Places in 1997.
