= Coan Baptist Church =

Historic church in Virginia, US

- U.S. National Register of Historic Places
- Virginia Landmarks Register
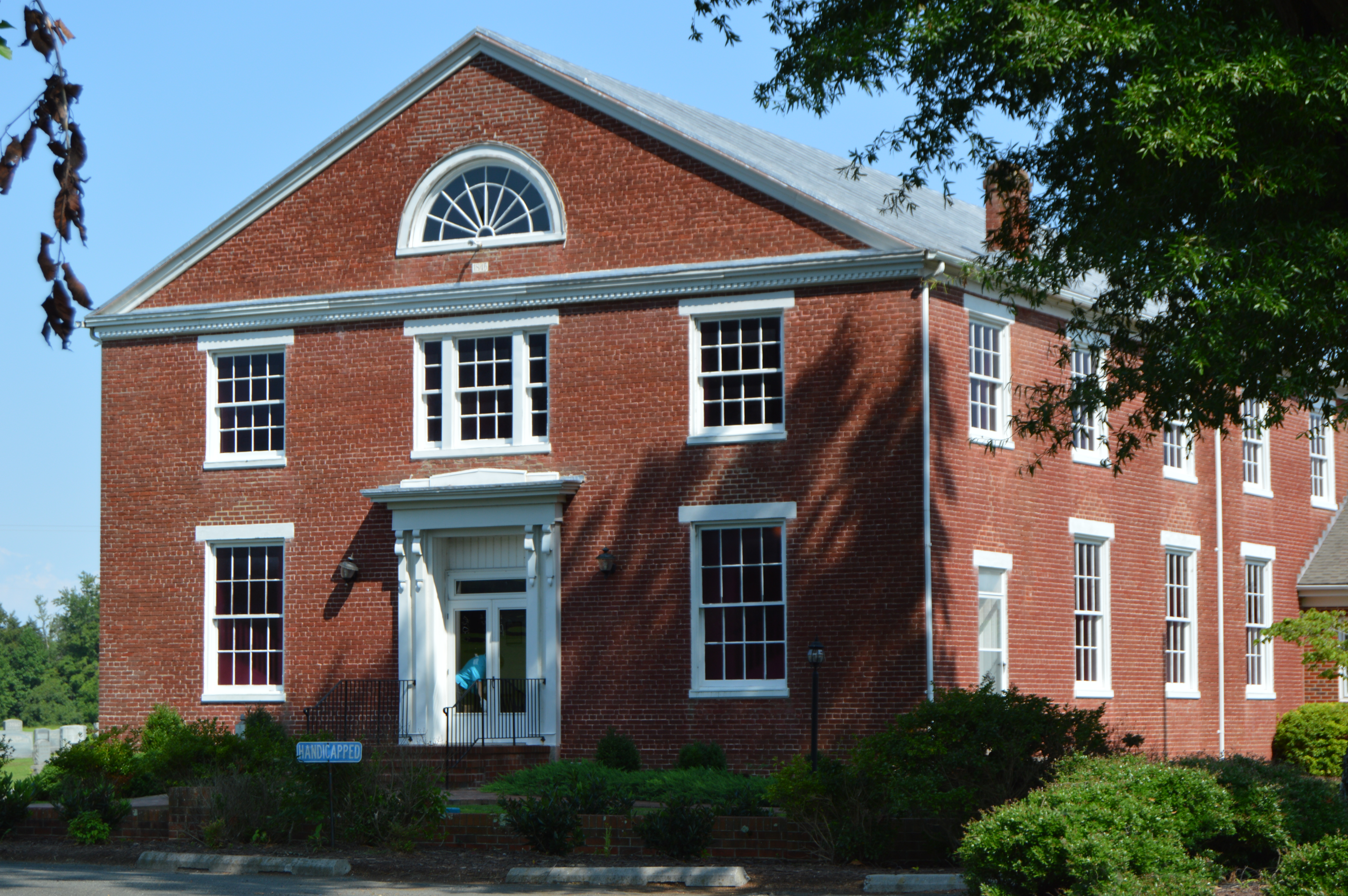
- Front and southern side

- Location within Virginia Location within the United States
- Location: Coan Church Road east of Coan Stage Road, west of Heathsville, Virginia
- Coordinates: 37°55′31″N 76°30′51″W
- Area: 9 acres (3.6 ha)
- Built: 1846
- Built by: Addison Hall
- Architectural style: Federal, Greek Revival
- NRHP reference No.: 95000239
- VLR No.: 066-0086

Significant dates
- Added to NRHP: March 17, 1995
- Designated VLR: January 15, 1995

Coan Baptist Church, also known as Wicomico Church, is a historic Southern Baptist church located near Heathsville, Northumberland County, Virginia. The current building was built in 1846, and is a rectangular, two-story, gable-roofed, brick structure. It has Federal and Greek Revival style design elements. Additions were made in 1957, 1975 and 2000. The congregation was founded in 1804 as the Wicomico Church.

It was listed on the National Register of Historic Places in 1995.
