= Versailles (Burgess, Virginia) =

Historic house in Virginia, United States

- U.S. National Register of Historic Places
- Virginia Landmarks Register
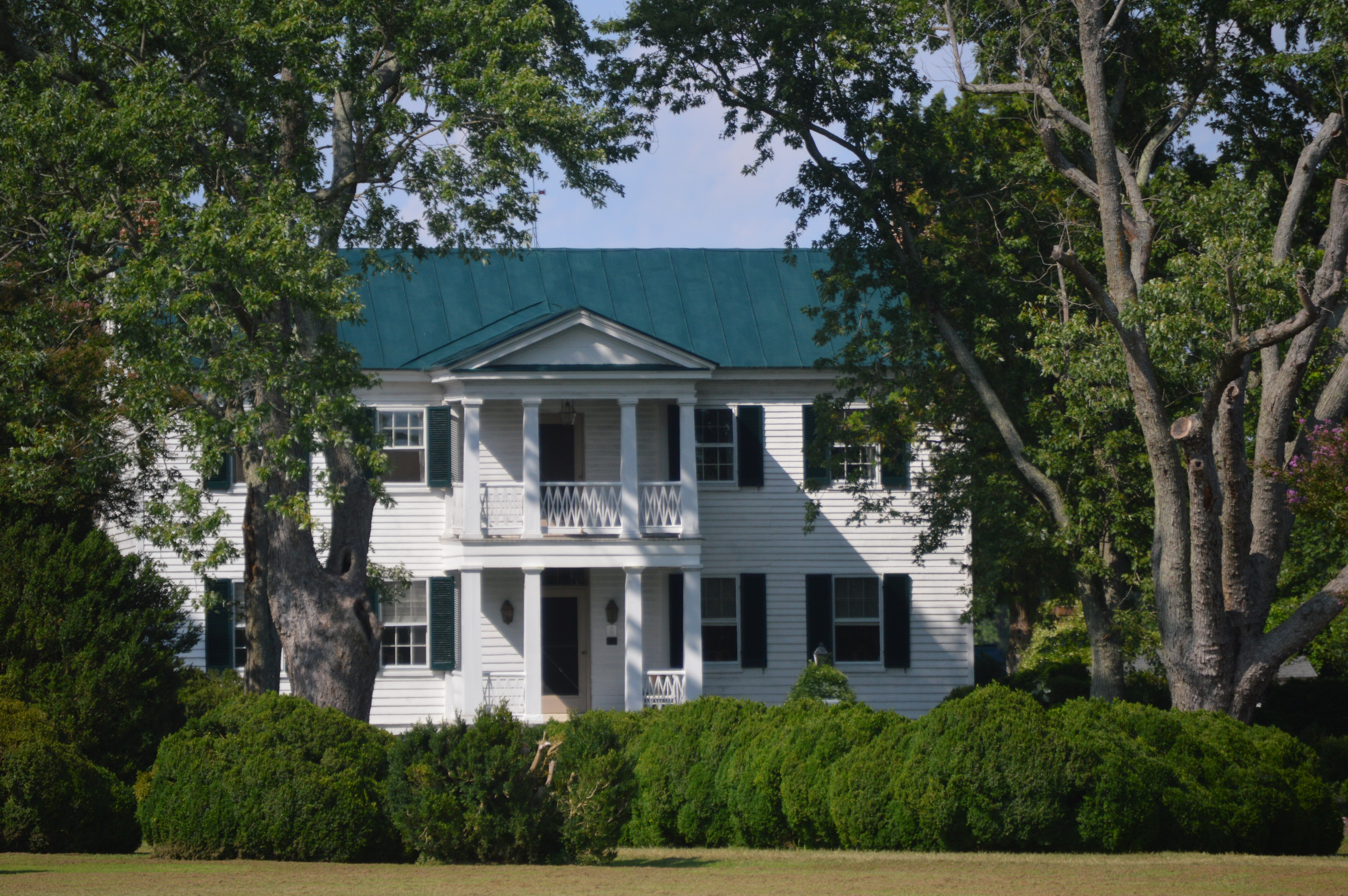
- Roadside view of the house

- Location within Virginia Location within the United States
- Location: U.S. Route 360, 0.25 mi. W of jct. with VA 200, Burgess, Virginia
- Coordinates: 37°53′14″N 76°21′8″W
- Area: 3.2 acres (1.3 ha)
- Built: 1853-1857
- Architectural style: Greek Revival
- NRHP reference No.: 97000204
- VLR No.: 066-0096

Significant dates
- Added to NRHP: February 27, 1997
- Designated VLR: December 4, 1996

Versailles is a historic home located at Burgess, Northumberland County, Virginia. It was built between 1853 and 1857, and is a 2 1/2-story, five-bay, frame I-house dwelling with Greek Revival style design elements. It measures approximately 46 feet by 30 feet, and is topped by a gable roof. The front facade features a two-story pedimented entrance porch with a classical entablature and second floor balcony.

It was listed on the National Register of Historic Places in 1997.
