= Kilmarnock, Virginia =

- Town
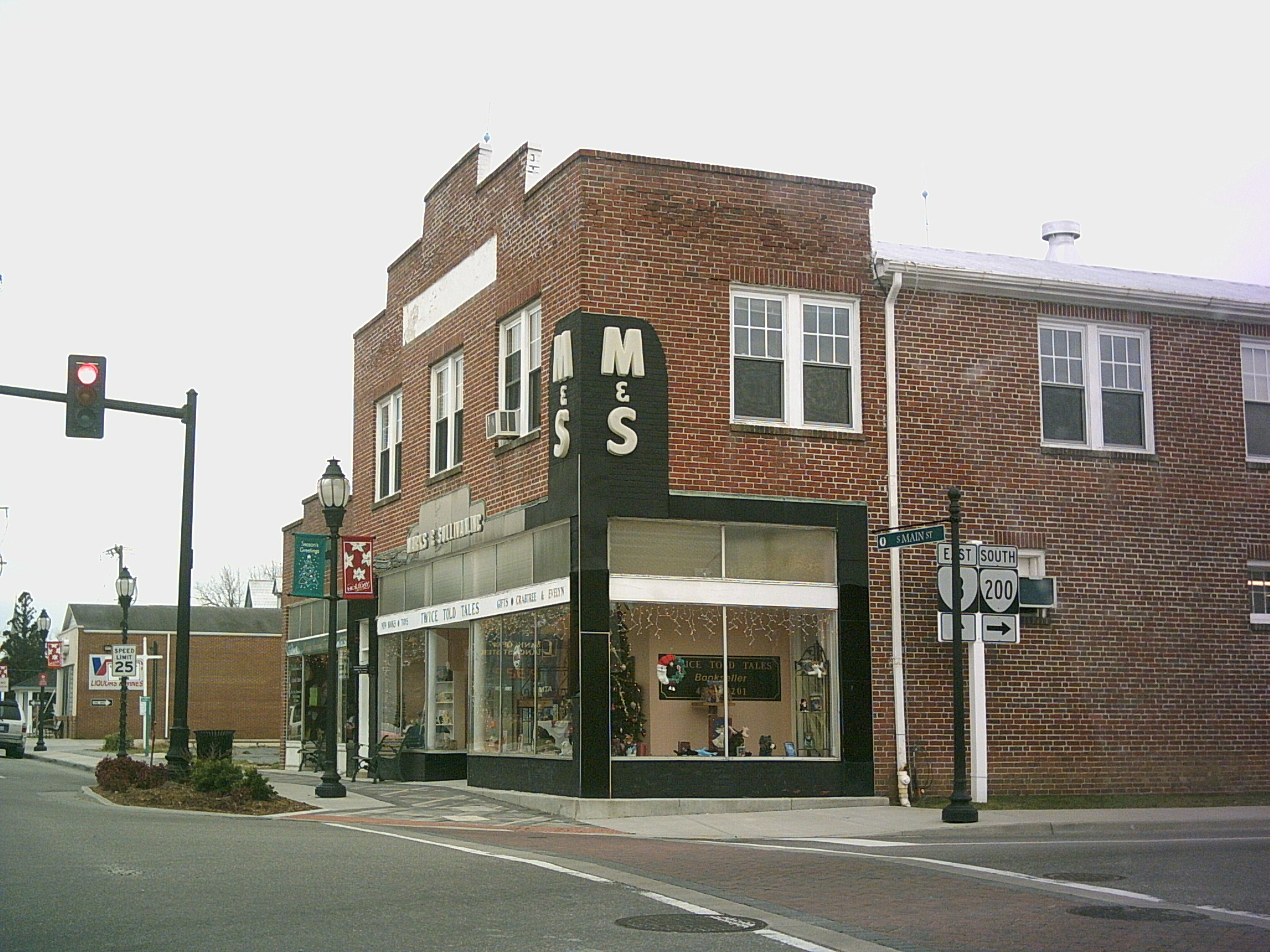
- Street corner in downtown Kilmarnock

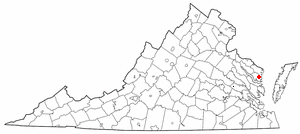
- Location of Kilmarnock, Virginia
- Coordinates: 37°42′45″N 76°22′54″W
- Country: United States
- State: Virginia
- Counties: Lancaster, Northumberland
- Foundation: February 1, 1650
- Establishment of Post Office: August 10, 1804
- Incorporated as a town: December 8, 1930

Area
  - Total: 3.42 sq mi (8.86 km^{2})
  - Land: 3.41 sq mi (8.83 km^{2})
  - Water: 0.012 sq mi (0.03 km^{2})
- Elevation: 89 ft (27 m)

Population (2020)
  - Total: 1,445
  - Density: 409.1/sq mi (157.94/km^{2})
- Time zone: UTC-5 (Eastern (EST))
  - Summer (DST): UTC-4 (EDT)
- ZIP code: 22482
- Area code: 804
- FIPS code: 51-42424
- GNIS feature ID: 1495790
- Website: www.kilmarnockva.com

Kilmarnock is a town in Lancaster and Northumberland counties in the U.S. Commonwealth of Virginia. The population was 1,445 at the 2020 census. It is located near the mouth of the Rappahannock River and is located within the Northern Neck George Washington Birthplace American Viticultural Area winemaking appellation. There is a small hospital in the town. Lancaster Middle School, grades 4–8, is also located in town. Approximately 500 students attend the school.

== History ==
=== Modern Period and Foundation ===
The town was founded on February 1, 1650 and was called “the Crossroads”. The land where the current town stands was patented to Gervais Dodson and George Wale. Wale, however, would later becomes the sole owner of the territory.

By 1659, another protagonist in the town's history made his way within the town from England, named Anthony Steptoe. He would later claim part of Wale's patent on March 1, 1676. Later on, his grandson, William Steptoe, on 1764, sold a 2 1\2 acre parcel of today’s Kilmarnock to Robert Gilmour, who worked for a mercantile firm (Bogle, Somerville & Co.) in Glasgow, Scotland and owned a significant property in Kilmarnock, Scotland.

The local anglican church in the town was created in 1735.

At this point, the town was no longer called "the Crossroads", but "Steptoe’s Ordinary" due to the influence of William Steptoe, but that was about to change.

The town would later adopt the name "Kilmarnock" and have its first ever mention under that name in a deed filed by Rawleigh Hazard, a silversmith who had moved in the town and bought some acres of land on December 7, 1778.

=== Early Contemporary Period ===
On August 10, 1804, John Hall becomes the first postmaster of Kilmarnock. He was already known in the area for operating the very first shop in the town, sold to him by Peter Tankersley in 1803.

It would take up to 1897 for Kilmarnock to get its own local newspaper, "The Chesapeake Watchman", with a certain John Palmer as the editor. During this period, the Eubank Hotel is also built, the same hotel which on November 13, 1909 causes the very first historic fire in the entire town's history, burning down significant portions of the town. This was not the only historic fire, in fact there was another one in the bowling alley on Main Street on the northern edge of town burning both sides of Main Street, on July 6, 1915. The aftermath of all these fires led the locals to build houses with fire-resistant material from then on.

=== Later Contemporary Period ===
The community was growing, and by 1916, had its own water company, granting safe water to all of the community, and by 1918, its own electric company. The Fairfax Theater opens up in 1925 and on December 8, 1930, the town is finally incorporated as such; With Raleigh D. Carter as its first Mayor and S. G. Purcell the first Sergeant.

On March 17, 1952, the final historic fire occurred after several years, St. Patrick’s Day's fire began when the Hazel Building caught on fire once again. The high winds led the fire to sweep onto Main Street. The buildings rebuilt after the 1915 fire were lost due to the common attic.

On April, 2006 "Main Street revitalization project" begins, with the aid of federal, VDOT and local community funds. This leads to the creation of the “Steptoe’s District”, in honour of Steptoe.

== Geography ==
Kilmarnock is located at 37°42′45″N 76°22′54″W (37.712437, -76.381707).

According to the United States Census Bureau, the town has a total area of 2.9 square miles (7.5 km^{2}), of which 2.9 square miles (7.4 km^{2}) is land and 0.35% is water.

Kilmarnock hosts the Holly Ball, a debutante ball founded in 1895, at the Indian Creek Yacht and Country Club every December.

== Demographics ==
Historical population
Census	Pop.	Note	%±
1880	59		—
1940	614		—
1950	689		12.2%
1960	927		34.5%
1970	841		−9.3%
1980	945		12.4%
1990	1,109		17.4%
2000	1,244		12.2%
2010	1,487		19.5%
2020	1,445		−2.8%
U.S. Decennial Census

As of the 2020 census, the total population is 1,445. The town has 802 total housing units, with 687 occupied and 645 of those belonging to families. 115 houses were vacant. 54.7% of homes were owned instead of rented. Of the population, 926 are white, 446 are black, 37 are mixed race, 18 are Hispanic or Latino, 17 are Asian, 3 are American Indian, 1 is Hawaiian, and 15 are some other race.

The median age in Kilmarnock is 60.2. 42% of the population is 65 years or older. 10.7% of the population is a veteran, with 89% of those being male. 23.1% of the population had a bachelor's degree or other form of higher education.

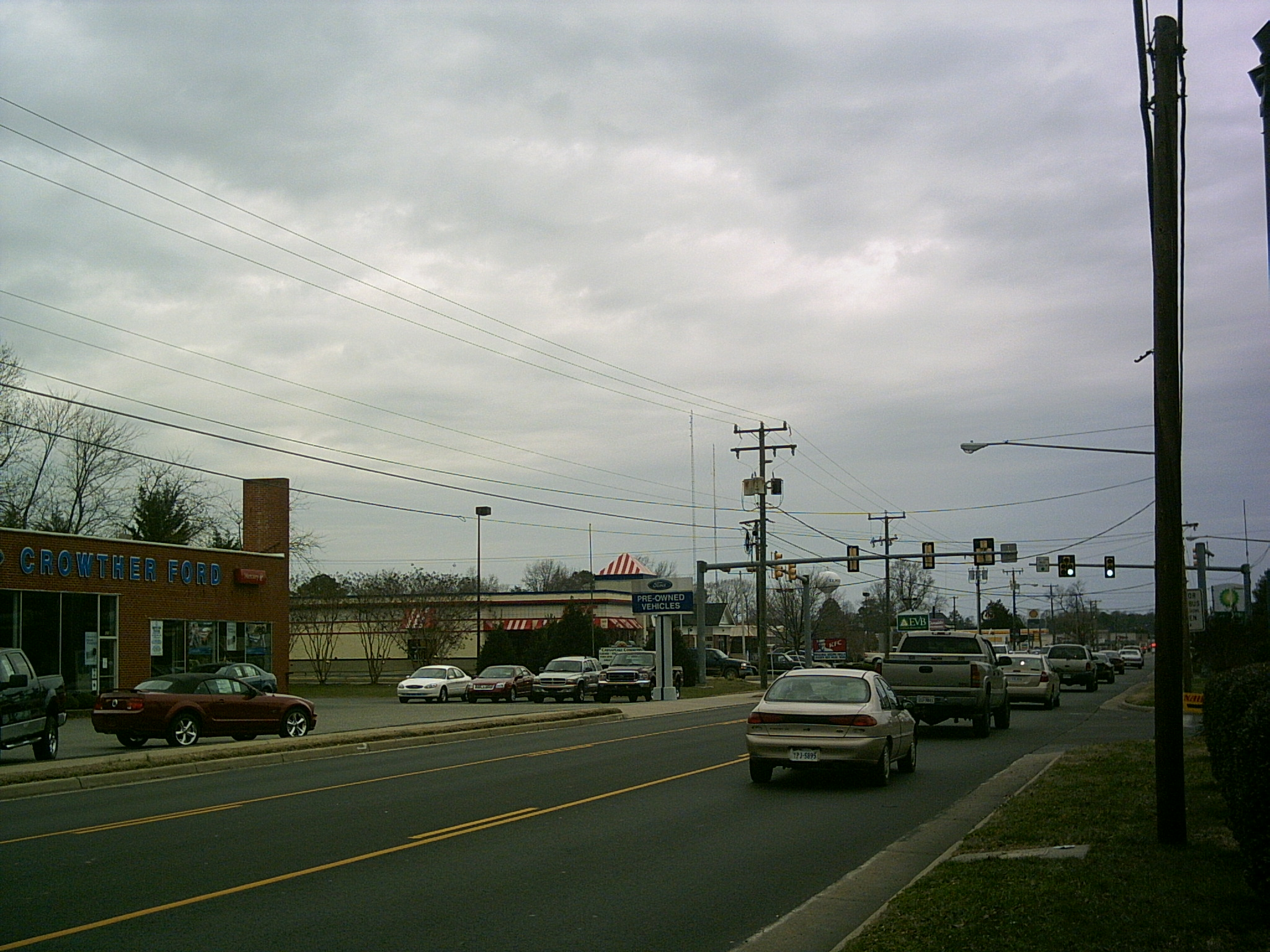
Outskirts of Kilmarnock

The median household income was $36,875. 29.4% of the population was below the poverty line, 77.4% of which were under 18. 23.9% of the remainder was between 18 and 64 while the remaining 17.4% was 65 or older. The median income for families is $44,242 while for married-couple families it is $71,125 and $25,677 for non-family households.
