= William Jones =

William Jones may refer to:

== Academics ==
- William Jones (college principal) (1676–1725), principal of Jesus College, Oxford, 1720–1725
- William Jones (philologist) (1746–1794), English judge and philologist who proposed a relationship among Indo-European languages
- William Jones (anthropologist) (1871–1909), Native American specialist in Algonquian languages
- W. H. S. Jones (William Henry Samuel Jones, 1876–1963), British author, translator and academic

== Arts and entertainment ==
- William Ifor Jones (1900–1988), Welsh conductor and organist
- William Andrew Jones (1907–1974), actor, better known as Billy De Wolfe
- W. S. Jones (William Samuel Jones, 1920–2007), Welsh playwright and script writer
- Wil Jones (artist) (William Richard Jones, 1960–2020), Welsh portrait painter
- William James Jones (born 1975), American actor
- William Jones (game designer), American horror fiction writer and game designer
- William E. Jones (filmmaker) (born 1962), American experimental filmmaker

== Business and industry ==
- William Jones (haberdasher) (died 1615), haberdasher, philanthropist and founder of Monmouth School, Wales
- William Highfield Jones (1829–1903), industrialist, local politician, author and benefactor in Wolverhampton
- W. Alton Jones (1891–1962), American industrialist and philanthropist
- Ernest Jones (trade unionist) (William Ernest Jones, 1895–1973), British trade union leader

== Criminals ==
- William Jones (Australian convict) (1827–1871), Australian colony ex-convict schoolteacher
- William Jones (gangster) (fl. 1911), New York City criminal
- W. D. Jones (1916–1974), criminal who travelled with Bonnie and Clyde
- William Jones, the perpetrator of the murder of Jared Plesec

== Military ==
- William Jones (1803–1864), Union Army lieutenant colonel, politician and owner of the Colonel William Jones House in Indiana
- William Jones (British Army officer) (1808–1890), British Army general
- William E. Jones (general) (1824–1864), Confederate cavalry general
- William G. Jones, colonel of the 36th Ohio Infantry Regiment
- William Gore Jones (1826–1888), British admiral
- William Jones (American sailor) (1831–?), American Union Navy sailor
- William Jones (VC) (1839–1913), British soldier
- William H. Jones (Medal of Honor) (1842–1911), American cavalry private and Medal of Honor recipient
- William M. Jones (1895–1969), Canadian Army officer
- William K. Jones (1916–1998), American Marine Corps lieutenant general
- William A. Jones III (1922–1969), US Air Force colonel and Medal of Honor recipient
- William Jones (soldier) (1836–1864), Irish-born American soldier and Medal of Honor recipient

== Politics and law ==
=== U.K. ===
- William Jones (judge) (1566–1640), Welsh judge and English member of parliament
- William Jones (of Treowen) (died 1640), English politician who sat in the House of Commons in 1614
- William Jones (Parliamentarian) (fl. 1640s), Welsh lawyer and politician who sat in the House of Commons
- William Jones (law officer) (1631–1682), English lawyer and politician
- William Nathaniel Jones (1858–1934), Welsh Liberal politician, businessman and soldier
- William Jones (Arfon MP) (1859–1915), British Liberal politician
- Kennedy Jones (journalist) (William Kennedy Jones, 1865–1921), British journalist and member of parliament
- William Henry Hyndman Jones (1847–1926), British colonial judge and administrator
- Sir William Hollingworth Quayle Jones (1854–1925), British judge in Sierra Leone and acting governor

=== U.S. ===
- William Jones (deputy governor) (1624–1706), Deputy Governor of the Colony of Connecticut
- William Jones (governor) (1753–1822), Governor of Rhode Island, 1811–1817
- William Jones (statesman) (1760–1831), fourth US Secretary of the Navy and US congressman from Pennsylvania
- William Giles Jones (1808–1883), American federal judge
- William E. Jones (politician) (1808 or 1810–1871), justice of the Supreme Court of the Republic of Texas
- William J. Jones (1810–1897), justice of the Supreme Court of the Republic of Texas
- William Hemphill Jones (1811–1880), American politician
- William F. Jones (1813–1890), American politician in Indiana
- William C. Jones (New York politician) (1822–1877), American politician from New York
- William D. Jones (1830–1905), American politician in the Wisconsin State Assembly
- William W. Jones, mayor of Toledo, Ohio (1871–1875 and 1877–1879)
- William Theopilus Jones (1842–1882), delegate to the US Congress from the Territory of Wyoming
- William A. Jones (politician) (1844–?), American politician in the Wisconsin State Assembly
- William Atkinson Jones (1849–1918), US congressman from Virginia
- William G. Jones (politician), (1861–1956), state legislator in Iowa
- William Carey Jones (1855–1927), US congressman from Washington
- William Jones (Wisconsin politician) (1894–1977)
- William Moseley Jones (1905–1988), American politician in the California State Assembly
- William Blakely Jones (1907–1979), American federal judge
- Burt Jones (William Burton Jones, born 1979), lieutenant governor of Georgia
- William H. Jones (South Carolina politician), state legislator in South Carolina
- William H. Jones (Mississippi politician), state legislator
- William N. Jones (1926–2018), member of the Utah State Senate

=== Elsewhere ===
- William Jones (Welsh radical) (1726–1795), Welsh political radical
- William Jones (Chartist) (1809–1873), Welsh political radical and Chartist
- William Jones (New Zealand politician) (1868–1953), member of parliament in New Zealand
- William Jones (Newfoundland politician) (1873–1930), physician and politician in Newfoundland

== Religion ==
- William Jones of Nayland (1726–1800), British Anglican priest and author
- William Jones (Welsh priest) (1755–1821), Welsh Anglican priest
- William Jones (Welsh Baptist writer) (1762–1846)
- William Henry Jones (1817–1885), English Anglican priest and antiquarian
- William Henry Jones (Methodist) (1874–1939), Australian churchman
- William Basil Jones (1822–1897), Welsh Anglican bishop of St David's
- J. William Jones (1836–1909), American Baptist minister and Lost Cause advocate
- William Jones (bishop of Puerto Rico) (1865–1921), American Catholic bishop of Puerto Rico
- William Jones (dean of Brecon) (1897–1974), British Anglican priest
- William A. Jones (bishop of Missouri) (1927–2020)
- William Augustus Jones Jr. (1934–2006), American Baptist minister and civil rights movement leader

== Science and medicine ==
- William Jones (mathematician) (1675–1749), Welsh mathematician who proposed the use of the symbol π
- William Jones (naturalist) (1745–1818), English naturalist and entomologist
- William Jones (optician) (1763–1831), English optician and scientific instrument maker
- William Allen Jones (1831–1897), Canadian dentist and miner
- William Eifion Jones (1925–2004), Welsh marine botanist
- William Paul Jones (born 1952), cognitive scientist
- William Ernest Jones (psychiatrist) (1867–1957), English-Australian psychiatrist

== Sports ==
=== Association football (soccer) ===
- William P. Jones (1870–1953), Druids F.C. and Wales international footballer
- William Roberts Jones (1870–1938), Aberystwyth F.C. and Wales international footballer
- William Jones (English footballer, born 1876) (1876–1959), Bristol City F.C., Tottenham Hotspur F.C. and England international footballer
- William Jones (Welsh footballer, born 1876) (1876–1918), West Ham United F.C. and Wales international footballer
- William Lot Jones (bap. 1882–1941), Manchester City F.C. and Wales international footballer
- William Jones (Port Vale footballer) (fl. 1905)
- William Jones (English footballer, fl. 1930s), English footballer with Gillingham F.C.
- Morris Jones (footballer) (William Morris Jones, 1919–1993), English footballer with Port Vale F.C., Swindon Town F.C. and others

=== Basketball ===
- Renato William Jones (1906–1981), popularizer of basketball in Europe & Asia and a founding father of FIBA
- Wil Jones (basketball coach) (1938–2014), American basketball point guard and coach
- Wil Jones (basketball, born 1947), American basketball power forward

=== Combat sports ===
- William Jones (British wrestler), British Olympic wrestler in 1908
- Gorilla Jones (William Landon Jones, 1906–1982), American boxer, world middleweight champion
- Chilly Willy (wrestler) (William Jones, born 1969), American professional wrestler

=== Cricket ===
- William Jones (South Australia cricketer) (1864–1924), Australian cricketer
- William Jones (cricketer, born 1911) (1911–1941), Welsh cricketer
- William Jones (cricketer, born 1990), Australian-born English cricketer

=== Water sports ===
- William Jones (rower) (1925–2014), Uruguayan rower who competed in the 1948 Summer Olympics
- William Jones (canoeist) (born 1931), Australian sprint canoer
- William Jones (Canadian sailor) (born 1995)

=== Other sports ===
- Bert Jones (rugby, born 1906) (William Herbert Jones, 1906–1982), rugby union and rugby league football for Wales, Llanelli, and St. Helens
- Dub Jones (American football) (William Augustus Jones, 1924–2024)
- Tex Jones (William Roderick Jones, 1885–1938), Chicago White Sox first baseman
- William Jones (sport shooter) (1928–2017), Canadian Olympic shooter
- William Jones (sprinter) (born 2003), American sprinter, 2023-2025 All-American for the USC Trojans track and field team
- William Jones (rugby union) (1894–1978), Welsh international rugby union player
- William Downes Jones, Scottish international lawn bowler

== Other people ==
- William Bence Jones (1812–1882), Anglo-Irish agriculturist
- William Ebeneezer Jones Jr. (born 1959), missing child in New Jersey
- William A. Jones (writer), British author of MindWealth: building Personal Wealth from Intellectual Property Right

== Other uses ==
- William Jones (novel), a 1944 Welsh-language novel by T. Rowland Hughes
- USS William Jones, a Clemson-class destroyer in the US Navy

== See also ==
- Bill Jones (disambiguation)
- Billy Jones (disambiguation)
- Will Jones (disambiguation)
- Willie Jones (disambiguation)
- William Corbett-Jones, American pianist
- William Stanton Jones (1866–1951), Anglican bishop
- William West Jones (1838–1908), second bishop and first archbishop of Cape Town
