= Bill Jones =

Bill Jones may refer to:

== Sports ==
- Bill Jones (basketball, born 1914) (1914–2006), American professional basketball player in 1942 and a pioneer of racial integration in the sport
- Bill Jones (basketball, born 1936) (1936–2008), American college basketball coach who coached North Alabama University to the NCAA Division II national title in 1978–79
- Bill Jones (basketball, born 1944), American college basketball coach who coached Jacksonville State University to the NCAA Division II national title in 1984–85
- Bill Jones (basketball, born 1958), American professional basketball player known for his career in Australia's National Basketball League
- Bill Jones (basketball, born 1966), American professional basketball journeyman in numerous countries; played collegiately for Iowa
- Bill Jones (catcher), Major League Baseball player in 1884
- Bill Jones (outfielder) (1887–1946), Major League Baseball player
- Bill Jones (running back) (born 1966), American football player
- Bill Jones (Indiana State football coach) (1914–1999), American high school and college football coach
- Bill Jones (Australian footballer, born 1887) (1887–1979), Australian rules footballer for Geelong in 1915
- Bill Jones (Australian footballer, born 1891) (1891–1961), Australian rules footballer for Richmond
- Bill Jones (Australian footballer, born 1897) (1897–1967), Australian rules footballer for Geelong in 1920
- Bill Jones (Australian footballer, born 1912) (1912–1987), Australian rules footballer for Carlton and North Melbourne
- Bill Jones (Australian footballer, born 1920) (1920–1986), Australian rules footballer for Fitzroy
- Bill Jones (Australian footballer, born 1935) (1935–1996), Australian rules footballer for Collingwood and Oakleigh
- Bill Jones (footballer, born 1921) (1921–2010), English international footballer (Liverpool)
- Bill Jones (footballer, born 1924) (1924–1995), English footballer (Manchester City, Chester City)
- Bill Jones (Notre Dame football coach), American football player and coach at Notre Dame University, and head coach at Carroll College 1931–1932
- Bill Jones (speed skater) (1923–2003), British Olympic speed skater
- Bill Jones (sportscaster), sportscaster based in Dallas

== Politics ==
- Bill Jones (California politician) (born 1949), former California Secretary of State
- Bill Jones (Mississippi politician), former member of the Mississippi House of Representatives
- Bill Jones (academic), Lecturer at Liverpool Hope University who writes books about politics.

== Arts and entertainment ==
- Bill Jones (artist) (born 1946), photographer, installation artist and performer based in New York
- Bill Jones (musician), English folk singer
- Bill T. Jones (born 1952), American artistic director, choreographer and dancer

== Other ==
- Bill Jones (steelmaking) (1839–1889), American steelmaking inventor and manager
- Bill Jones (trade unionist) (1900–1988), British trade unionist
- Canada Bill Jones (c. 1837–1877), confidence man, riverboat gambler, and card sharp

== See also ==
- Billy Jones (disambiguation)
- Will Jones (disambiguation)
- William Jones (disambiguation)
- Willie Jones (disambiguation)
- Bill Ryder-Jones (born 1983), guitarist with Wirral band The Coral
