= William H. Jones =

William H. Jones may refer to:

- William H. Jones (Medal of Honor), U.S. Army soldier and Medal of Honor recipient
- William H. Jones (South Carolina politician), state legislator in South Carolina
- William Highfield Jones, English industrialist and mayor of Wolverhampton
- William Hemphill Jones, mayor of Wilmington, Delaware
- William Henry Jones, English Anglican priest, antiquarian and author
- William H. Jones (Mississippi politician), state legislator
- Bert Jones (rugby, born 1906) (William Herbert Jones), Welsh rugby union and rugby league player

== See also ==
- William Jones (disambiguation)
