= William A. Jones =

William A. Jones may refer to:

- William A. Jones (politician), member of the Wisconsin State Assembly
- William Atkinson Jones (1849–1918), member of the U.S. House of Representatives
- William Augustus Jones Jr. (1934–2006), African-American minister and civil rights leader
- Dub Jones (American football) (William Augustus Jones, born 1924), former American footballer
- William Jones (bishop of Puerto Rico) (William Ambrose Jones, 1865–1921), bishop of Puerto Rico, 1907–1921
- William A. Jones (bishop of Missouri) (William Augustus Jones Jr., 1927–2020)
- William A. Jones III (1922–1969), US Air Force officer and Medal of Honor recipient
- William A. Jones (writer), British author of MindWealth: building Personal Wealth from Intellectual Property Right

== See also ==
- William Jones (disambiguation)
