= Thomas Downing =

Thomas Downing may be:

- Thomas Downing (restaurateur) (1791–1866), American abolitionist and restaurateur
- Thomas Downing (athlete) (1883–1943), Irish Olympic athlete
- Thomas Downing (painter) (1928–1985), American painter
- Thomas J. Downing (1867–1927), American politician
- Thomas N. Downing (1919–2001), American politician and grandson of Thomas J. Downing
