= List of North Alabama Lions men's basketball head coaches =

The following is a list of North Alabama Lions men's basketball head coaches. There have been seven head coaches of the Lions in their 90-season history.

North Alabama's current head coach is Tony Pujol. He was hired as the Lions' head coach in April 2018, replacing Bobby Champagne, who was fired after the 2017–18 season.

No.	Tenure	Coach	Years	Record	Pct.
1	1931–1948 (Note: Records for multiple seasons during this period are incomplete.) (Note: North Alabama did not field a team for the 1943–44 and 1944–45 seasons.)	Eddie Flowers	15	77–10	.885
2	1948–1972	Ed Billingham	24	249–312	.444
3	1972–1974	Bill E. Jones	2	28–17	.622
4	1974–1988	Bill L. Jones	14	259–141	.648
5	1988–2003	Gary Elliott	15	270–150	.643
6	2003–2018	Bobby Champagne	15	245–194	.558
7	2018–present	Tony Pujol	5	63–86	.423
Totals		7 coaches	90 seasons	1,191–991	.546
Records updated through end of 2022–23 season Source
