= Thomas H. B. Browne =

American politician

Thomas Henry Bayly Browne
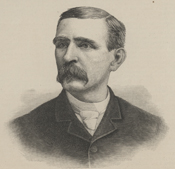

Member of the U.S. House of Representatives from Virginia's 1st district
- In office March 4, 1887 – March 3, 1891
- Preceded by: Thomas Croxton
- Succeeded by: William A. Jones

Personal details
- Born: February 8, 1844 Drummondtown, Virginia, US
- Died: August 27, 1892 (aged 48) Drummondtown, Virginia, US
- Party: Republican
- Education: University of Virginia School of Law
- Occupation: Attorney

Military service
- Allegiance: Confederate States of America
- Branch/service: Confederate States Army
- Unit: 39th Virginia Infantry; Stuart Horse Artillery
- Battles/wars: American Civil War

Thomas Henry Bayly Browne (February 8, 1844 – August 27, 1892) was a Virginia lawyer, Confederate veteran and two-term Republican member of the United States House of Representatives from Virginia's 1st congressional district (1887–1891).

== Early life and education ==
Browne was born in Drummondtown (renamed Accomac shortly after his death) in Accomack County on Virginia's Eastern Shore. His father, Dr. Peter Fielding Browne (1813-1880), and his mother, Sally Cropper Bayly (1813-1857), both descended from the First Families of Virginia, with many relatives likewise politically prominent on the Eastern Shore of Maryland. He had a sister who died as an infant and an elder brother Orris Applethwaite Browne (1842-1898). His grandfather Thomas Henry Bayly and uncle Thomas Monteagle Bayly both served in the U.S. House of Representatives. Educated by private tutors as befit his class, Browne later attended Hanover Academy and Bloomfield Academy, both in Virginia. After the American Civil War discussed below, Browne studied law and graduated from the law department of the University of Virginia in 1867.

== Personal life ==
After the war, Browne married Anna Drummond Fletcher (1849-1926). One of their daughters and two sons (including the future World War I artillery commander and Brigadier General Beverly Fielding Browne) survived to adulthood.

== Confederate soldier ==
During the Civil War Browne dropped out of school to enlist as a private in Company F of 39th Virginia Infantry, where his widowed father served as surgeon (and would by 1864 run a division of Chimborazo Hospital in Richmond). Browne later fought with Chew's Battalion of Stuart Horse Artillery. He was with the Army of Northern Virginia when it surrendered at Appomattox Court House on April 9, 1865. His elder brother Orris, after graduating from VMI in 1862, served on the CSS Shenandoah.

== Career ==
Admitted to the Virginia bar in 1868, Browne returned to his home town to practice law, and his elder brother also returned and advocated agricultural reforms as well as held a state job regulating the oyster industry. Accomack County voters elected Browne as Commonwealth attorney (prosecutor) in 1873, and re-elected him as well.

In 1886, voters in the surrounding 1st Congressional district narrowly elected Browne as a Republican to represent them in the 50th United States Congress. He defeated incumbent Thomas Croxton. Two years later Browne won re-election to the 51st Congress, but in 1890 Democrat William A. Jones defeated him.

== Death ==
Browne returned to his law practice in Drummondtown, where he died a few months later.

== Elections ==
- 1886; Browne defeated the incumbent Democrat, Thomas Croxton, with 54.07% of the vote to be elected to the U.S. House of Representatives.
- 1888; Browne was re-elected with 50.71% of the vote, defeating Democrat Gilmer S. Kendall.
- 1890; Browne lost his bid fore re-election, winning only 45.4% of the vote. Democrat William A. Jones won.

U.S. House of Representatives
Preceded by Thomas Croxton	Member of the U.S. House of Representatives from Virginia's 1st congressional district 1887–1891	Succeeded by William A. Jones
