= Willie Jones =

Willie Jones may refer to:

== Sports ==
- Willie Jones (fullback) (1939–2016), American football player with the Buffalo Bills
- Willie Jones (defensive lineman, born 1942), American football player with the Houston Oilers and Cincinnati Bengals
- Willie Jones (defensive lineman, born 1957), American football player with the Oakland Raiders
- Willie Jones (offensive lineman) (born 1975), American football player with the Kansas City Chiefs
- Willie Jones (third baseman) (1925–1983), American Major League Baseball player
- Willie Jones (catcher) (1902–?), American Negro leagues baseball player
- Willie Jones (basketball player) (born 1936), former NBA player for the Detroit Pistons
- Willie Jones (basketball coach) (born c. 1981), American college basketball coach for North Carolina A&T
- Willie Jones (cricketer) (1916–1996), Welsh cricketer
- Hutch Jones (Willie D. Jones, born 1959), former NBA player for the San Diego Clippers
- William Downes Jones, also known as Willie Jones, Scottish international lawn bowler

== Music ==
- Willie Jones (drummer) (1929–1991), American drummer
- Willie Jones III (born 1968), American musician and drummer
- Little Willie Jones (born 1936), American blues singer
- Willie Jones (country singer) (born 1994), American country singer

== Other ==
- Willie Jones (statesman) (1740–1801), North Carolina delegate to the Continental Congress

== See also ==
- Will Jones (disambiguation)
- William Jones (disambiguation)
- Billy Jones (disambiguation)
- Bill Jones (disambiguation)
