= Billy Jones =

Billy Jones may refer to:

== Sports ==
- Billy Jones (baseball), baseball coach at Appalachian State
- Billy Jones (basketball), Maryland Terrapins basketball player
- Billy Jones (footballer, born 1876) (1876–1959), English footballer
- Billy Jones (footballer, born 1881) (1881–1948), English footballer who played for Small Heath/Birmingham and Brighton & Hove Albion
- Billy Jones (footballer, born 1983), English football defender
- Billy Jones (footballer, born 1987), English footballer, currently playing for Rotherham United F.C.
- Billy Lot Jones (?–1941), Welsh footballer and Manchester City F.C. player

== Music ==
- Billy Jones (singer, born 1889) (1889–1940), 1920–1930s American tenor and half of The Happiness Boys with Ernie Hare
- Billy Jones (Outlaws guitarist) (1949–1995), American guitarist with the rock band Outlaws
- Billy Jones, guitarist and vocalist with London-based music group Heatwave

== Other ==
- ABilly S. Jones-Hennin (1942–2024), American LGBT rights activist
- Billy Jones (railroader) (1884–1968), American railroad operator
- Billy Jones (artist) (1935–2012), American-born artist and poet who immigrated to Australia
- Billy Jones (politician) (born 1974), New York state assemblyman

== See also ==
- Bill Jones (disambiguation)
- William Jones (disambiguation)
- Willie Jones (disambiguation)
- Will Jones (disambiguation)
