= Thomas Croxton =

American politician

Member of the U.S. House of Representatives from Virginia's 1st district
- In office March 4, 1885 – March 3, 1887
- Preceded by: George T. Garrison
- Succeeded by: Thomas H. B. Browne

Personal details
- Born: March 8, 1822 Tappahannock, Virginia
- Died: July 3, 1903 (aged 81) Tappahannock, Virginia
- Party: Democratic
- Education: University of Virginia
- Occupation: Attorney

Military service
- Allegiance: Confederate States
- Branch/service: Confederate States Army
- Rank: Captain
- Unit: General George Pickett's staff
- Battles/wars: American Civil War

Thomas Croxton (March 8, 1822 – July 3, 1903) was a U.S. representative from Virginia.

== Biography ==
Born in Tappahannock, Virginia, Croxton attended primary school there and, later, the Tappahannock and Rappahannock Academies. He graduated from the law department of the University of Virginia at Charlottesville in 1842; admitted to the bar, he commenced practice in Tappahannock, Virginia. He served as attorney for the Commonwealth from 1852 to 1865, when he resigned. During the Civil War Croxton served on the staff of General George E. Pickett.

Croxton was elected as a Democrat to the Forty-ninth Congress (March 4, 1885 – March 3, 1887). He was an unsuccessful candidate for reelection in 1886 to the Fiftieth Congress. After his failure to be reelected, he resumed the practice of law and engaged in agricultural pursuits.

In 1892, Croxton was elected judge of Essex County, Virginia, and served from 1892 until his resignation in 1901. He died in Tappahannock, Virginia, July 3, 1903 and was interred in St. John's Episcopal Churchyard. There are papers relating to his law practice at the Special Collections Research Center at the College of William and Mary.

== Elections ==
- 1884; Croxton was elected to the U.S. House of Representatives with 51% of the vote, defeating Republican Robert Murphy Mayo.
- 1886; Croxton lost his re-election bid to Republican Thomas Henry Bayly Browne.

U.S. House of Representatives
Preceded by George T. Garrison	Member of the U.S. House of Representatives from Virginia's 1st congressional district 1885–1887	Succeeded by Thomas H. B. Browne
