= Little Willy =

Little Willy may refer to:

- Little Willy (song) by the Sweet
- Little Willie, a British tank
- Little Willie rhymes, macabre poetic personification of youthful mischief
- Little Willy Foster, an American Chicago blues musician
- Little Willie Jackson, an American jazz and rhythm & blues saxophonist and bandleader
- Little Willie John, an American rhythm and blues singer
- Little Willie Jones, an American soul singer and musician
- Little Willie Littlefield, an American rhythm & blues and boogie-woogie pianist and singer
- Willie Tonga, an Australian professional rugby league footballer
- Little Willy Wonka, a fictional character in Roald Dahl's children's novels
- The Little Willies, an American alternative country music group
- A nickname for William, German Crown Prince
- Little Willie Pearl, the 44-grain pearl from a River Tay mussel
