= George Tankard Garrison =

American politician

Member of the U.S. House of Representatives from Virginia's 1st district
- In office March 4, 1881 – March 3, 1883
- Preceded by: Richard L. T. Beale
- Succeeded by: Robert M. Mayo
- In office March 20, 1884 – March 3, 1885
- Preceded by: Robert M. Mayo
- Succeeded by: Thomas Croxton

Member of the Virginia Senate from Accomack and Northampton Counties
- In office 1863 – 1865
- Preceded by: Oswald Finney
- Succeeded by: Samuel Powell

Member of the Virginia House of Delegates from Accomack County
- In office 1862 – 1863
- Preceded by: Arthur Watson
- Succeeded by: Thomas Parramore

Personal details
- Born: January 14, 1835 Accomack County, Virginia
- Died: November 14, 1889 (aged 54) Accomac, Virginia
- Party: Democratic
- Spouse: Charlotte Ailworth
- Education: Dickinson College; University of Virginia
- Occupation: Attorney

Military service
- Allegiance: Confederate States of America
- Branch/service: Confederate States Army
- Rank: Private
- Battles/wars: American Civil War

George Tankard Garrison (January 14, 1835 – November 14, 1889) was a U.S. representative from Virginia.

== Early life and education ==
Born in Accomack County, Virginia, Garrison was graduated from Dickinson College, Carlisle, Pennsylvania, in 1853 and from the law department of the University of Virginia, Charlottesville, Virginia, in 1857.

== Career ==
He was admitted to the bar and commenced practice in Accomac. He served as a private in the Confederate States Army during the Civil War. He served as member of the Virginia House of Delegates during the period 1861–1863. He served in the Senate of Virginia in the years 1863–1865. He resumed the practice of law and also engaged in agricultural pursuits.

Garrison was elected judge of the eighth Virginia circuit in 1870 and subsequently judge of the seventeenth circuit.

Garrison was elected as a Democrat to the Forty-seventh Congress (March 4, 1881 – March 3, 1883). He successfully contested the election of Robert M. Mayo to the Forty-eighth Congress and served from March 20, 1884, to March 3, 1885. He resumed the practice of law.

== Later life and death ==
Garrison was elected judge of the county court of Accomack County, Virginia. He died at Accomac, Virginia, November 14, 1889.

== Elections ==
- 1880; Garrison was elected to the U.S. House of Representatives with 48.17% of the vote, defeating Republican John W. Woltz and Readjuster John Critcher.
- 1882; Garrison initially lost re-election to Readjuster Robert Murphy Mayo by one vote. The result of the race was contested and Garrison was seated in the House for a second term.

== Sources ==
- United States Congress. "George Tankard Garrison (id: G000084)". Biographical Directory of the United States Congress.

U.S. House of Representatives
Preceded by Richard L. T. Beale	Member of the U.S. House of Representatives from Virginia's 1st congressional district 1881–1883	Succeeded by Robert M. Mayo
Preceded by Robert M. Mayo	Member of the U.S. House of Representatives from Virginia's 1st congressional district 1884–1885	Succeeded by Thomas Croxton
