= Edward J. Robeson Jr. =

American politician

Edward John Robeson Jr.
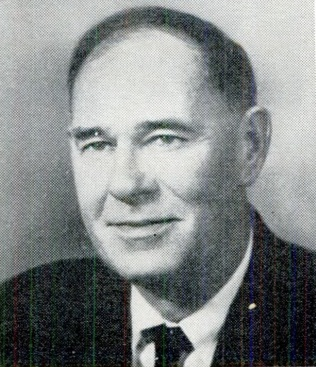

Member of the U.S. House of Representatives from Virginia's 1st district
- In office May 2, 1950 – January 3, 1959
- Preceded by: S. Otis Bland
- Succeeded by: Thomas N. Downing

Personal details
- Born: August 9, 1890 Waynesville, North Carolina, U.S.
- Died: March 10, 1966 (aged 75) Pascagoula, Mississippi, U.S.
- Party: Democratic
- Education: University of Georgia
- Occupation: civil engineer

Edward John Robeson Jr. (August 9, 1890 – March 10, 1966) was a U.S. representative from Virginia.

Born in Waynesville, North Carolina, Robeson moved from Wythe County, Virginia, with his parents to Cartersville, Georgia, in 1891. He attended the public schools in Quitman, Marietta, and Sparta, Georgia. He graduated from the University of Georgia at Athens in 1910. While a student at the university, he was a member of the Phi Kappa Literary Society. He worked as a civil engineer in Bay Minette, Alabama, and Ironwood, Michigan from 1910 to 1915. He was employed with the Newport News (Virginia) Shipbuilding & Dry Dock Co. from 1915 until his retirement April 30, 1950, as vice president and personnel manager.

== Coaching career ==
Edward J. Robeson Jr.
Coaching career (HC unless noted)
- 1924–1925: Apprentice

Head coaching record
- Overall: 7–6–4

Robeson was the third head football coach at The Apprentice School in Newport News, Virginia and he held that position for two seasons, from 1924 until 1925. His record at Apprentice was 7–6–4.

== Political career ==
Robeson was elected as a Democrat to the Eighty-first Congress to fill the vacancy caused by the death of Schuyler Otis Bland. He was reelected to the Eighty-second and to the three succeeding Congresses and served from May 2, 1950, to January 3, 1959. He was an unsuccessful candidate for renomination in 1958.

He was a signatory to the 1956 Southern Manifesto that opposed the desegregation of public schools ordered by the Supreme Court in Brown v. Board of Education.

=== Elections ===
- 1950 – Robeson was elected to the U.S. House of Representatives with 81% of the vote, defeating Republican Nile Straughan and Independent Stanley S. Garner.
- 1952 – Robeson was re-elected unopposed.
- 1954 – Robeson was re-elected unopposed.
- 1956 – Robeson was re-elected with 50.83% of the vote, defeating Republican Horace E. Henderson.
- 1958 – Robeson was defeated by Thomas N. Downing for renomination.

== Post political life ==
He was a resident of Newport News, Virginia, until 1964, at which time he returned to Waynesville, North Carolina. He died in Pascagoula, Mississippi, on March 10, 1966. He was interred in Green Hill Cemetery, Waynesville.

== Sources ==
- United States Congress. "Edward J. Robeson Jr. (id: R000329)". Biographical Directory of the United States Congress.

U.S. House of Representatives
Preceded by S. Otis Bland	Member of the U.S. House of Representatives from Virginia's 1st congressional district 1950–1959	Succeeded by Thomas N. Downing
