= Henry P. Scott =

African-American businessman and politician

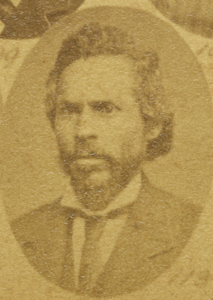
- Official portrait, 1878

Member of the Mississippi House of Representatives from Issaquena County
- In office 1878
- Preceded by: William H. Jones

Personal details
- Party: Republican

Henry P. Scott was a grocer, farmer, sheriff, tax collector, and state legislator in Mississippi.

He was born in Mississippi and enslaved at birth. He was a delegate to the 1865 Mississippi black convention at Vicksburg. He was elected to represent Issaquena County in the Mississippi House of Representatives in 1877.

Records vary on his birth year.

== See also ==
- African American officeholders from the end of the Civil War until before 1900
