= Barrett Jones =

American football player (born 1990)

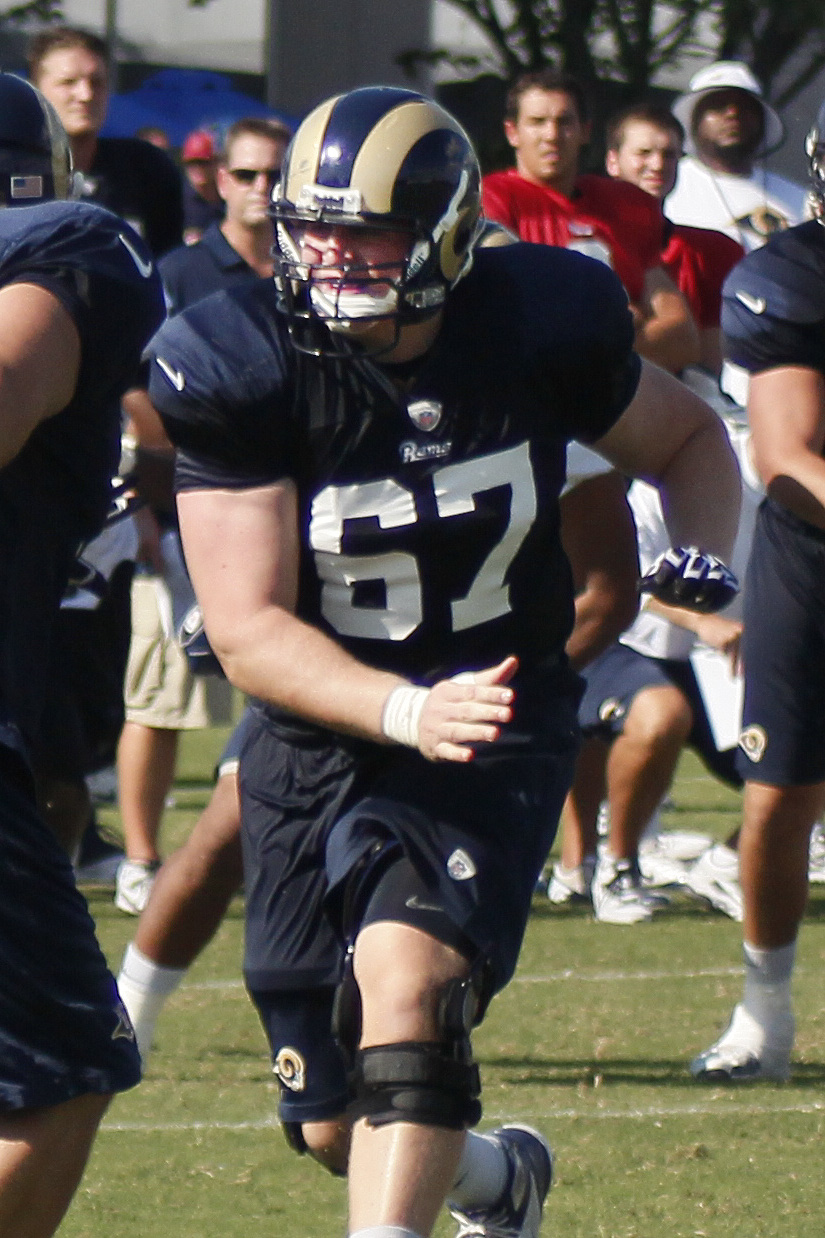
- Jones with the St. Louis Rams in 2013

No. 67
- Position: Guard

Personal information
- Born: May 25, 1990 (age 36); Memphis, Tennessee, U.S.
- Listed height: 6 ft 4 in (1.93 m)
- Listed weight: 308 lb (140 kg)

Career information
- High school: Evangelical Christian (Memphis)
- College: Alabama (2008–2012)
- NFL draft: 2013: 4th round, 113th overall pick

Career history
- St. Louis Rams (2013–2014); Pittsburgh Steelers (2015)*; Chicago Bears (2015)*; Philadelphia Eagles (2015)
- * Offseason or practice squad member only

Awards and highlights
- 3× BCS national champion (2009, 2011, 2012); Outland Trophy (2011); Rimington Trophy (2012); Wuerffel Trophy (2011); Jim Parker Trophy (2011); William V. Campbell Trophy (2012); Unanimous All-American (2011); Consensus All-American (2012); Third-team All-American (2010); Jacobs Blocking Trophy (2011); 3× First-team All-SEC (2010−2012)

Career NFL statistics
- Games played: 10
- Stats at Pro Football Reference

Barrett A. Jones (born May 25, 1990) is an American former professional football player who was a guard in the National Football League (NFL). He played college football as a center for the Alabama Crimson Tide, winning the Rimington Trophy as the best center in college football. He was selected by the St. Louis Rams in the fourth round of the 2013 NFL draft.

== Early life ==
Jones was born in Memphis, Tennessee. He attended Evangelical Christian School in Memphis, where he played for the Evangelical Christian Eagles high school football team. Following his senior season in 2007, he was a first-team all-state selection by The Tennessean and the Tennessee Sports Writers Association, and was a U.S. Army high school All-American.

Considered a four-star recruit by Rivals.com, Jones was listed as the No. 1 center in the nation in 2008.

His father Rex attended the University of Alabama and played for the Alabama Crimson Tide men's basketball team from 1982 to 1984. Barrett has two brothers, Harrison and Walker, that also played football for the University of Alabama. Barrett's grandfather, Bill Jones, is a college basketball head coaching legend in the state of Alabama.

== College career ==
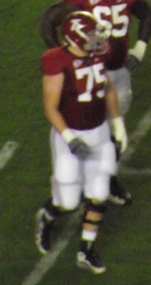
Jones at Alabama circa 2011.

Jones received an athletic scholarship to attend the University of Alabama, where he played for coach Nick Saban's Alabama Crimson Tide football team from 2008 to 2012. After redshirting his initial year at Alabama, Jones started all 14 games for Alabama's 2009 national championship team at right guard. He subsequently earned Freshman All-America honors from College Football News and Phil Steele.

In his junior season, because of team needs, he switched from guard to left tackle where he started all 13 games for another Alabama national championship team. Following his 2011 junior season, he was a first-team All-Southeastern Conference (SEC) selection, and was recognized as a unanimous first-team All-American. He was the winner of the 2011 Outland Trophy given to the best lineman in college football. In his senior year, again because of team needs, he switched from tackle to center. He started every game at center for the team that won another National Championship in 2012. He did not receive a second Outland Trophy but won the Rimington Trophy given each year to the outstanding college center becoming only the 2nd person in history to win both an Outland and a Rimington. He is the only person to win an Outland and a Rimington at two different positions or in two different years. Barrett Jones ended his Alabama career winning 3 BCS National Championships—each Championship at a different position—as an All-American guard, an All-American right tackle and an All-American center.

Off the field, he has earned a degree in accounting, graduating summa cum laude in August 2011 with a 4.0 grade point average. He graduated in December 2012 with his masters again maintaining a 4.0 GPA. In addition, he was honored as one of 11 members of the 2011 Allstate AFCA Good Work "which honors football student-athletes for exemplary community service." Jones won the 2012 William V. Campbell Trophy, an award given by the National Football Foundation & College Hall of Fame to college's football's "best and brightest." He is a 2010 and 2011 Academic All-American and in his final school year of 2012–13, he earned distinction as both the NCAA Division I Football Academic All-America Team Member of the Year and the Academic All-America Team Member of the Year for all NCAA Division I sports. He received the 2011 ARA Sportsmanship Award and 2011 Wuerffel Trophy for combined athletic, academic and community service achievement. On December 6, 2012, Jones was awarded the Rimington Trophy as the best center in college football. Finally, he was named one of the 2014 recipients of the Today's Top 10 Award, given annually by the NCAA to 10 outstanding student-athletes who graduated in the school year before the award presentation.

Jones suffered a serious foot injury in the first quarter of the SEC Championship game but played the entire game so well that his teammates did not even know he had been injured. Even with the injury, in the BCS Championship game four weeks later, Jones earned praise for handling Notre Dame nose tackle Louis Nix III mostly by himself, giving left guard Chance Warmack the freedom to maneuver downfield to block Fighting Irish linebackers for Eddie Lacy and T. J. Yeldon. After the game, he announced that he had a Lisfranc injury of the left foot with at least 2 torn ligaments. He was scheduled for surgery immediately upon returning home to Alabama. As a result, he was unable to participate in the NFL Combine.

== Professional career ==
Pre-draft measurables
Height	Weight	Arm length	Hand span
6 ft 4 1/2 in (1.94 m)	306 lb (139 kg)	34 1/8 in (0.87 m)	10 1/4 in (0.26 m)
All values from NFL Combine

=== St. Louis Rams ===
In the 2013 NFL draft, Jones was selected by the St. Louis Rams in the fourth round with the 113th overall draft pick. He participated in ten games from 2013 to 2014. On September 5, 2015, he was waived by the team.

=== Pittsburgh Steelers ===
On September 8, 2015, Jones was signed to the Pittsburgh Steelers' practice squad. On September 29, 2015, he was released from practice squad.

=== Chicago Bears ===
On October 6, 2015, Jones was signed by the Chicago Bears' practice squad, following a season-ending injury to Will Montgomery.

=== Philadelphia Eagles ===
On November 30, 2015, Jones was signed by the Philadelphia Eagles from the Bears' practice squad. On September 3, 2016, he was released by the Eagles.

== Broadcasting career ==
In 2017 Jones was hired by ESPN Radio as a color analyst for college football and occasional NFL broadcasts.
