= Robert Murphy Mayo =

Congressman & Confederate Army officer

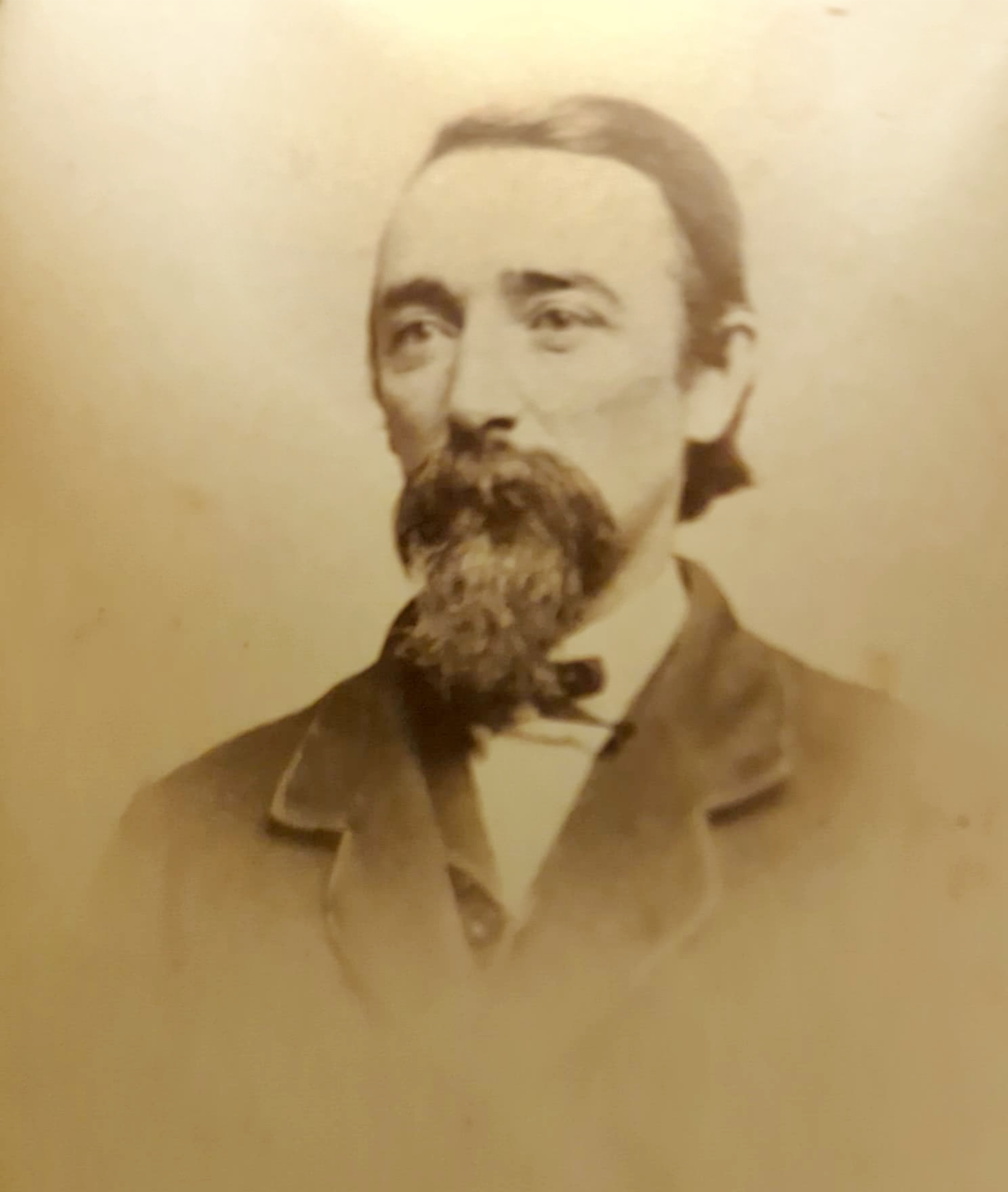

Member of the U.S. House of Representatives from Virginia's 1st district
- In office March 4, 1883 – March 20, 1884
- Preceded by: George T. Garrison
- Succeeded by: George T. Garrison

Member of the Virginia House of Delegates from Northumberland and Westmoreland Counties
- In office December 2, 1885 – December 3, 1889
- Preceded by: John Luttrell
- Succeeded by: Benjamin Chambers
- In office December 7, 1881 – 1883
- Preceded by: S. B. Burgess
- Succeeded by: John Luttrell

Personal details
- Born: April 28, 1836 Hague, Virginia, US
- Died: March 29, 1896 (aged 59) Hague, Virginia, US
- Resting place: Tucker Hill, Virginia
- Party: Readjuster
- Education: College of William and Mary; Lexington Law School
- Occupation: Attorney

Military service
- Allegiance: Confederate States of America
- Branch/service: Confederate Army
- Rank: Colonel
- Unit: 47th Virginia Infantry
- Battles/wars: American Civil War

Robert Murphy Mayo (April 28, 1836 – March 29, 1896) was a Virginia lawyer, Confederate officer and politician who served in the Virginia House of Delegates and briefly in the United States House of Representatives as a member of the Readjuster Party.

== Early life and education ==
Born in Hague, Westmoreland County, Virginia, in 1836, to Northern Neck plantation owner and Virginia judge Robert Mayo and his wife, the former Emily Ann Campbell, who had married in 1831. His grandfather Joseph Mayo and grandmother Jane Poythress Mayo had lived in Richmond, and his uncle Joseph Carrington Mayo, likewise a lawyer, would serve as Richmond's city attorney and mayor through the American Civil War. The younger Robert Mayo had two older brothers: Dr. John Campbell Mayo (1832–1871) and Joseph Campbell Mayo (1834–1898). He may also have had younger brothers William Mayo and Philip Mayo.

He attended private schools and briefly the College of William and Mary in Williamsburg, Virginia. He graduated from Virginia Military Institute at Lexington, Virginia, in 1858, and then taught mathematics at Mount Pleasant Military Academy, Sing Sing (now Ossining), New York, and later at his alma mater. While teaching in Lexington, Mayo also studied law at Lexington Law School in 1858 and 1859. His father owned 9 male and 11 female slaves in the 1850 federal census, which R.M. Mayo Jr. may have taken possession of by 1860.

== American Civil War ==
Robert M. Mayo enlisted in the Confederate States Army as a major on May 18, 1861, and helped organize the 47th Virginia Infantry the next month with Col. George William Richardson. The unit was initially based at Stafford and assigned to protect the shores of the Potomac and Rappahannock Rivers near most members' homes, but was told to withdraw in March 1862 before an expected advance of Union troops under General George McClellan. Mayo was elected the unit's colonel on May 1, 1862, and was wounded in the arm at Seven Pines opposing the Union Peninsular campaign. He was later convicted at a court martial on September 10, 1863, for drunkenness and sentenced to be reduced in rank, but ended up serving throughout the Civil War (except for sick furlough that began on September 1, 1864). He received his parole at Ashland on April 27, 1865.

His elder brother Joseph Campbell Mayo, who graduated in VMI's class of 1852, held similar positions with the 3rd Virginia Infantry (based in Norfolk and one of the companies originally assigned to capture the abolitionist John Brown in 1858 and early in the war defended the Atlantic Coast). J.C. Mayo was wounded at Sharpsburg and Gettysburg, and after the war practiced law in Richmond and became the treasurer of Virginia in 1872, before returning home to Westmoreland County and becoming its Commonwealth's Attorney, and eventually dying at his mansion "Auburn" in 1898.

== Career ==
R. M. Mayo Jr. was admitted to the bar and after the war returned to his legal practice in Westmoreland County and neighboring areas. He opened his office in Westmoreland County's seat, Hague in 1865. Westmoreland County voters elected R. M. Mayo their Commonwealth's attorney (prosecutor, one of three elected offices in the county). In 1881 voters in Northumberland and Westmoreland Counties elected Mayo to the Virginia House of Delegates (a part-time position), where he succeeded S. B. Burgess.

In the election of 1882, Mayo ran for a seat in the U.S. House of Representatives to represent Virginia's first district. The vote was close—he was first declared the loser, then the winner and then the loser again. Incumbent Democrat George T. Garrison of Accomack County according to the initial tally won 70 more votes than challenger Mayo. The Readjuster-controlled State Board of Canvassers then threw out the votes of Gloucester County and Hog Island (Garrison had received all 14 votes from Hog Island). Thus Mayo led by a single vote: 10,505–10,504. (A third candidate, Republican John W. Woltz, received only 168 votes.) Mayo was seated and served from March 4, 1883, until March 20, 1884. However, Garrison refused to concede, and the House Committee of Elections then chose to accept the Gloucester County and Hog Island ballots, so the House voted unanimously to seat Garrison halfway through the term.

Mayo then returned to Virginia's Northern Neck and resumed his legal practice. He was an unsuccessful candidate for reelection to Congress in 1884, but again won election to the House of Delegates in 1885 and 1887.

== Family life ==
Robert M. Mayo Jr. married Lucy Claybrook on December 3, 1867, in Westmoreland County. His wife was the daughter of Richard Claybrook and his wife Charlotte Brown Claybrook. They had daughters Nellie Mayo (1869–b/f 1880) and Charlotte Brown Mayo Johnson (1871–after 1893) and sons Richard Claybrook Mayo (1872–1911) and Archibald Campbell Mayo (1882–after 1917). In 1880 the household also included his father Judge Mayo and his younger brother farmer Philip Mayo, as well as household servants.

== Death and legacy ==
Robert Mayo died in Hague, Virginia, on March 29, 1896. He was interred in Yeocomico Cemetery in Tucker Hill, Virginia.

U.S. House of Representatives
Preceded by George T. Garrison	Member of the U.S. House of Representatives from Virginia's 1st congressional district 1883–1884	Succeeded by George T. Garrison
