= C. Harding Walker =

American politician

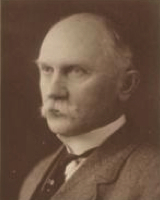
- Portrait of Walker, c. 1912

President pro tempore of the Virginia Senate
- In office January 13, 1915 – January 14, 1920
- Preceded by: Edward Echols
- Succeeded by: Saxon W. Holt

Member of the Virginia Senate
- In office December 6, 1899 – January 14, 1920
- Preceded by: John E. Mason
- Succeeded by: Thomas J. Downing
- Constituency: 36th district (1899–1904); 34th district (1904–1920)

Member of the Virginia House of Delegates for Northumberland and Westmoreland
- In office December 1, 1897 – December 6, 1899
- Preceded by: Malcolm A. Coles
- Succeeded by: George J. Gouldman

Personal details
- Born: Cyrus Harding Walker; January 27, 1859 Northumberland, Virginia, U.S.
- Died: February 23, 1934 (aged 75) Heathsville, Virginia, U.S.
- Party: Democratic
- Spouse: Mary Rosa Starke
- Education: University of Virginia

Cyrus Harding Walker (January 27, 1859 – February 23, 1934) was an American lawyer and Democratic politician. First elected to the Virginia Senate in 1898 after a brief stint in the House of Delegates, he went on to serve in this body for the next two decades. For the last five years of his tenure as the 34th district's senator, he was the President pro tempore of the Senate of Virginia.

== Early life and education ==
Walker was born in Northumberland County, Virginia on January 27, 1859. He was the third child of William Wright Walker, an attorney, and Clara Rebecca Walker (née Harding). He received a law degree from the University of Virginia; while there, he was a member of the Eta chapter of the Phi Kappa Sigma fraternity. Remaining active in the affairs of the school up until his death, he served on its Board of Visitors from 1917 to 1934 and as the rector from 1922 to 1930.

== Career ==
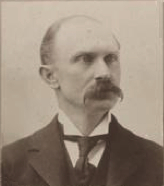
Delegate Walker, 1897

From 1883 to 1893, after graduating from law school, Walker taught at Davis Military School in North Carolina.

After being elected on the Democratic ticket in 1897 to the Virginia House of Delegates, Walker served one full two-year term, representing Northumberland and Westmoreland counties. As was typical in the late nineteenth to early twentieth century, the Democrats had an overwhelming majority in the state's legislature.

In 1898, Harding was elected to the Virginia Senate for the 34th district, which was then composed of King George, Richmond, Westmoreland, Northumberland, and Lancaster. By then a leader in local politics, he was elected to participate in the 1901-1902 Virginia Constitutional Convention. With the death of former lieutenant governor and then-senior senator Edward Echols, the office of President pro tempore was vacant. Walker was elected by his peers to take Echols's place.

== Personal life ==
Walker married Mary Rosa Starke in 1887. The couple had two sons, Henry and George, and one daughter, Marie. Their historic home, Oakley, in Heathsville is on the National Register of Historic Places.

Virginia House of Delegates
Preceded by Malcolm A. Coles	Virginia Delegate for Northumberland and Westmoreland; 1897–1899	Succeeded by George J. Gouldman
Senate of Virginia
Preceded by John E. Mason	Virginia Senator for the 34th District; 1899–1920	Succeeded by Thomas J. Downing
Preceded by Edward Echols	President pro tempore of the Virginia Senate; 1915–1920	Succeeded by Saxon W. Holt
