= St Laurence's Church, Bradford-on-Avon =

Anglo-Saxon church in Bradford-on-Avon, UK

Coordinates: 51.3470°N 2.2538°W

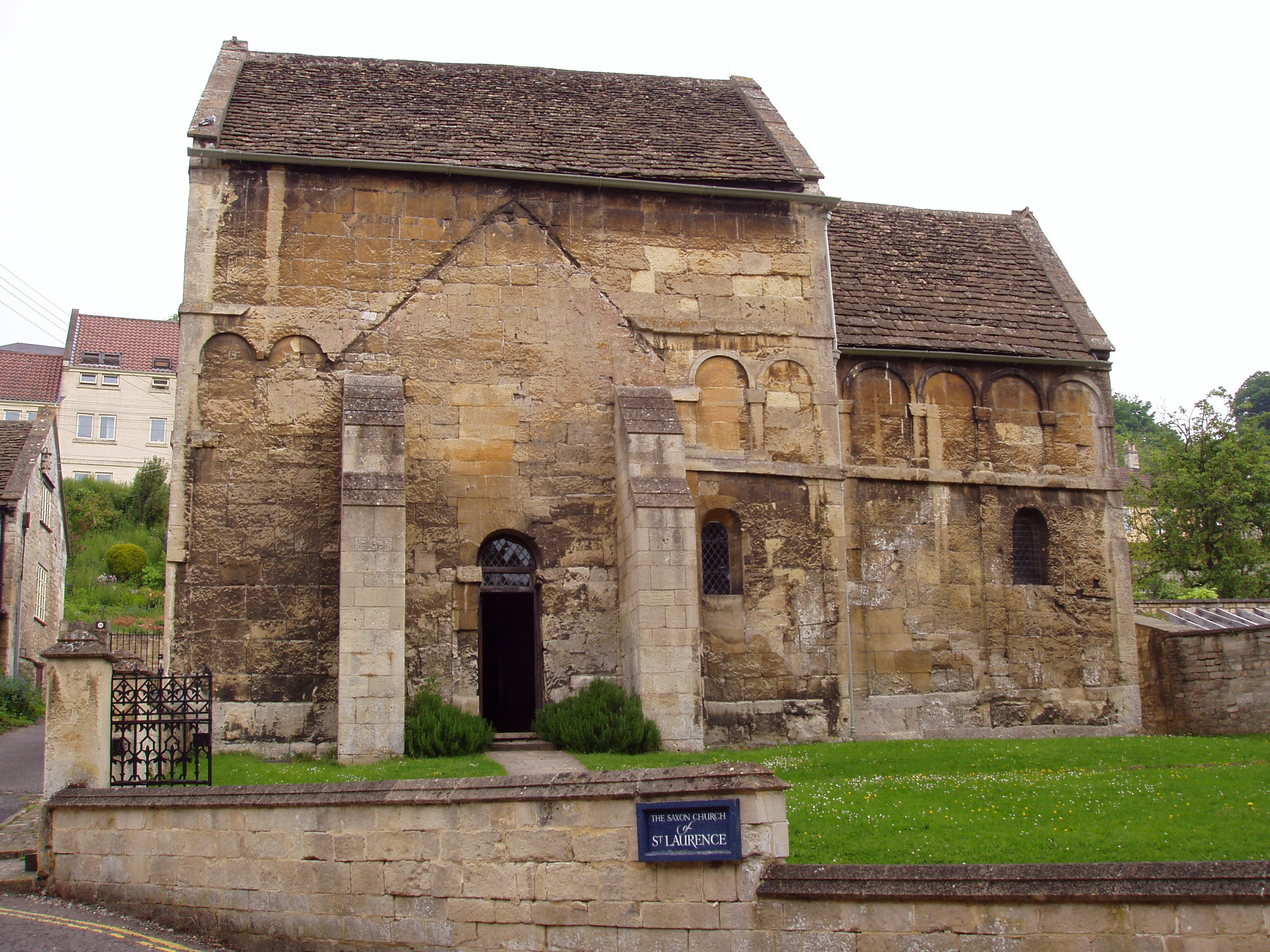
St Laurence's Church, Bradford-on-Avon, seen from the south in 2005

St Laurence's Church, Bradford on Avon, Wiltshire, is one of very few surviving Anglo-Saxon churches in England that does not show later medieval alteration or rebuilding.

The church is dedicated to St Laurence, and documentary sources suggest it may have been founded by Saint Aldhelm around 700, although the architectural style suggests a 10th- or 11th-century date. St Laurence's stands on rising ground close to the larger Norman parish church of the Holy Trinity.

The building was used as a combined school (nave) and cottage (chancel) for many years, both on more than one storey. It was rediscovered in 1856 by William Jones, rector of Holy Trinity, and restored between 1870 and 1880. In 1952 the church was designated as Grade I listed.

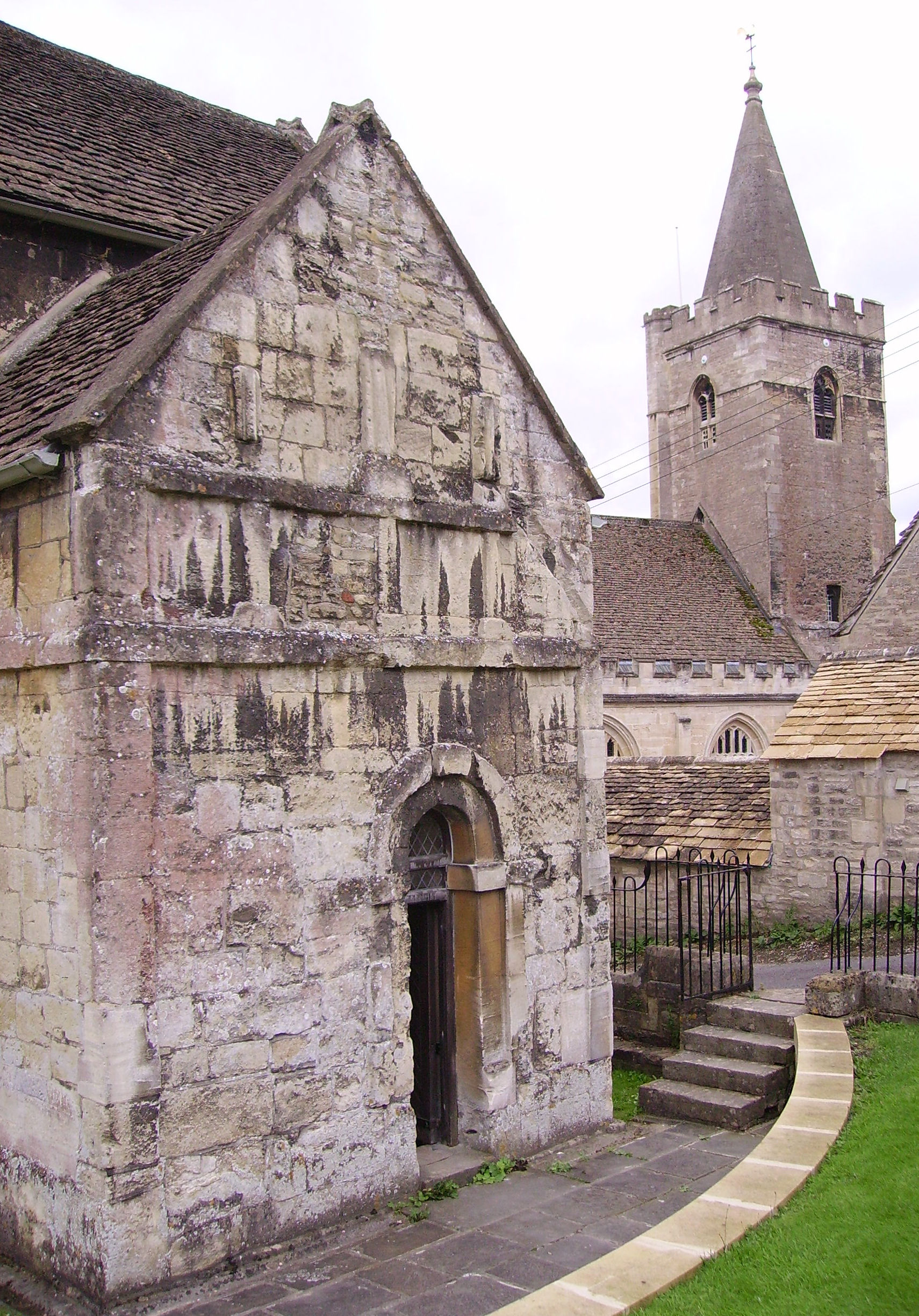
The porticus on the northern side of the church. (On the right is the Norman Holy Trinity Church.)

The date of the building has been much debated. H. M. Taylor stated in the 20th century that he believed the main fabric of the walls to their full height belonged to Aldhelm's time, after discussions with Dr Edward Gilbert. Most recent sources give a later date for all or most of the structure. It has been suggested it was built after 1001, when King Æthelred the Unready gave the site to the nuns of Shaftesbury Abbey, refugees from the Vikings. They were the custodians of the body of King Edward the Martyr, Æthelred's half-brother and already regarded as a saint, and it may have served as a mortuary chapel for him for a period, which might help explain why such a small but elaborate building was created.

It is the most complete Anglo-Saxon survival from this period, and follows what seems to have been a typical monastic plan at the time, though in miniature. In particular the decoration including fragments of large reliefs gives a hint of richness which documentary remains record in monastic churches. Although the existing church seems all or almost all Anglo-Saxon, it has clearly been altered in a number of ways, apart from the modern restoration, which included removing the stairs inside and filling in windows. For its small size, with the nave only some 7.5 metres (25 ft) long and a little over 4 m (13 ft) wide, the height of the building (around 8 m (26 ft) inside the nave) is notable. A porticus to the south has been lost, but otherwise the structure of the building seems complete in its final Anglo-Saxon state.

The pair of angels flying horizontally, in relief at about half life-size, probably flanked a large sculptural group of the Crucifixion, perhaps over the chancel arch.

The arcading on the exterior walls is produced, not by incision (as thought by Jackson and Fletcher), but by setting the massive stone pilaster-strips forward from the wall-face. In this they are similar to St Andrew's Church, Great Dunham and the tower of St Mary's Church, Tasburgh, both in Norfolk, and also to All Saints' Church, Earls Barton in Northamptonshire and St Peter's Church, Barton-upon-Humber in Lincolnshire.

== Sources ==
- Backhouse, Janet, Turner, D.H., and Webster, Leslie, eds.; The Golden Age of Anglo-Saxon Art, 966–1066, pp. 130, 139–141, 1984, British Museum Publications Ltd, ISBN 0714105325
- Pevsner, Nikolaus; Cherry, Bridget (revision) (1975) [1963]. Wiltshire. The Buildings of England. Harmondsworth: Penguin Books. pp. 129–131. ISBN 0-14-071026-4.
- "Victoria County History – Wiltshire – Vol 7 pp4-51 – Parishes: Bradford-on-Avon". British History Online. University of London.
- Article at Anglo-Saxon Churches website, archived in 2016
- Article at Great English Churches website
- "Church of St. Laurence, Bradford on Avon". Wiltshire Community History. Wiltshire Council.
