= John E. Mason =

American politician and judge (1854–1910)

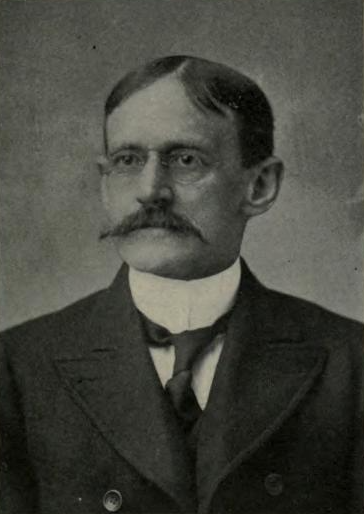
- Mason in 1904 publication

Member of the Virginia Senate from the King George, Richmond, Westmoreland, Northumberland and Lancaster district
- In office December 4, 1895 – March 4, 1898
- Preceded by: Robert J. Washington
- Succeeded by: C. Harding Walker

Member of the Virginia House of Delegates from the Stafford and King George district
- In office December 4, 1889 – March 8, 1894
- Preceded by: T. C. Montague
- Succeeded by: William J. Rogers

Personal details
- Born: John Enoch Mason; July 11, 1854 Edge Hill, Albemarle County, Virginia, U.S.
- Died: December 5, 1910 (aged 56) Fredericksburg, Virginia, U.S.
- Resting place: St. John's Church; King George, Virginia, U.S.
- Party: Democratic
- Spouse: Kate K. Henry (m. 1885)
- Children: 2
- Relatives: George W. Randolph (great-uncle); Thomas Jefferson Randolph (grandfather); Thomas Jefferson (great-great-grandfather)
- Education: University of Virginia
- Alma mater: Columbian College (LLB)
- Occupation: Politician; lawyer; judge

John Enoch Mason (July 11, 1854 – December 5, 1910) was an American politician, lawyer and judge from Virginia who served in both houses of the Virginia General Assembly representing King George County, Virginia, and adjacent counties. As a member of the Virginia House of Delegates, Mason represented King George and adjacent Stafford County from 1889 through 1894 and King George counties, and beginning in November 1895 through 1898, he represented King George county together with adjacent Richmond, Westmoreland, Northumberland and Lancaster counties.

== Early life ==
John Enoch Mason was born on July 11, 1854, at Edge Hill, Albemarle County, Virginia, to Maria Jefferson (née Randolph) and her husband Charles T. Mason, a Virginia state senator representing Stafford, King George and Prince William counties. At the time, his uncle Benjamin Franklin Randolph (1808–1870) was also serving in the Virginia senate, representing Albemarle County. His maternal grandfather was Thomas Jefferson Randolph, and his great-great-grandfather was Thomas Jefferson. His early education was at Locust Dale and Bethel Military Academy. During the American Civil War, he was too young to enlist, but another uncle, George W. Randolph represented the city of Richmond at the Virginia Secession convention and was the Confederate Secretary of war and also served in the Confederate Senate (1863–1865).

Mason studied at the University of Virginia, but did not graduate. He graduated from Columbian College with a Bachelor of Laws degree. He was admitted to the bar of King George County, Virginia, in September 1878.

== Career ==
After admission to the Virginia bar, Mason worked as a lawyer and served as a commonwealth attorney in King George County for three terms.

A Democrat, Mason won election and twice won re-election to the Virginia House of Delegates and represented King George and Stafford Counties, from December 4, 1889, to March 8, 1894. He then successfully ran for the Virginia Senate, and represented King George County together with the rest of the Northern Neck of Virginia (namely Richmond, Westmoreland, Northumberland and Lancaster counties), from December 4, 1895, to March 4, 1898. In 1898, fellow legislators elected Mason as a judge of the circuit court of the 10th district. After the re-organization of the judicial system under the new constitution, Mason was elected judge of the circuit court of the 15th district.

== Personal life ==
Mason married Kate K. Henry of Washington, D.C., in November 1885. They had two children, Flora R. and Thomas Jefferson. Mason was a member of the Episcopal Church and served as a vestryman of St. John's Church in King George, Virginia. He moved to Fredericksburg around 1905 and remodeled a home owned by the Marye family.

Mason died at his home in Fredericksburg on December 5, 1910. He was buried at St. John's Church in King George.
