= S. Otis Bland =

American politician

Schuyler Otis Bland
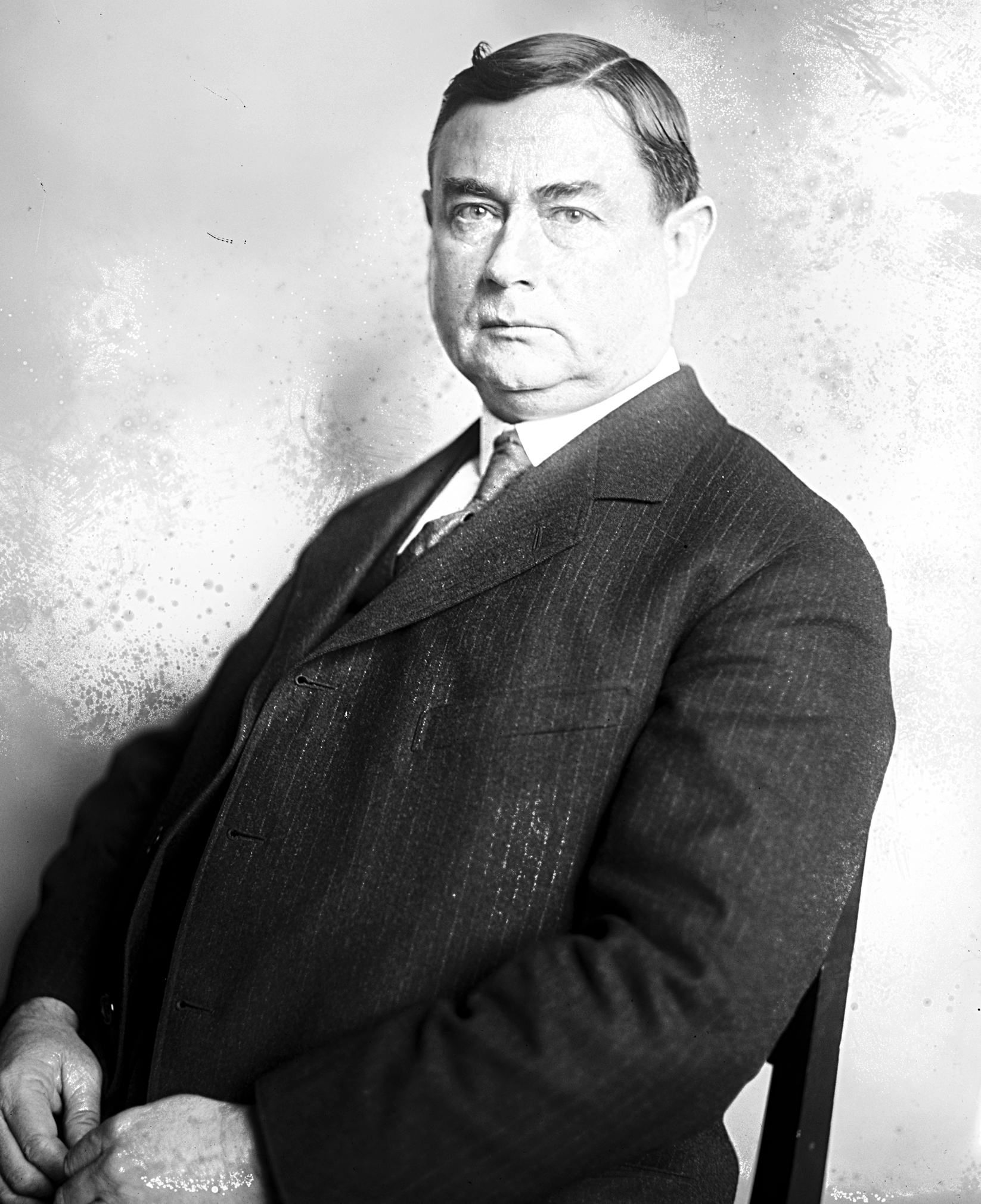

Member of the U.S. House of Representatives from Virginia's 1st district
- In office July 2, 1918 – February 16, 1950 at-large: March 4, 1933 – January 3, 1935
- Preceded by: William A. Jones
- Succeeded by: Edward J. Robeson, Jr.

Chairman of House Committee on Merchant Marine and Fisheries
- In office January 3, 1949 – January 3, 1951
- Preceded by: Alvin F. Weichel
- Succeeded by: Edward J. Hart
- In office March 4, 1933 – January 3, 1947
- Preceded by: Ewin L. Davis
- Succeeded by: Alvin F. Weichel

Personal details
- Born: May 4, 1872 Gloucester County, Virginia, U.S.
- Died: February 16, 1950 (aged 77) Bethesda, Maryland, U.S.
- Resting place: Newport News, Virginia
- Party: Democratic
- Education: College of William and Mary
- Profession: lawyer

Schuyler Otis Bland (May 4, 1872 – February 16, 1950) was a United States representative from Virginia. Born near Gloucester, Virginia, he attended the Gloucester Academy and the College of William and Mary. He was a teacher and a lawyer in private practice, and was elected as a Democrat to the Sixty-fifth Congress to fill the vacancy caused by the death of Representative William A. Jones. He was reelected to the 66th and to the 15 succeeding Congresses, serving from July 2, 1918, to February 16, 1950. While in the House, he was chair of the Committee on Merchant Marine and Fisheries (73rd through 79th Congresses and 81st Congress). The United States Merchant Marine Academy Library is named in his honor.

Bland died of a cerebral hemorrhage at the Bethesda Naval Hospital in Bethesda, Maryland and was interred in Greenlawn Cemetery, Newport News, Virginia.

== Early life ==
Schuyler Otis Bland was born May 4, 1872, on a farm in Gloucester County. His father, Schuyler Bland, a Confederate soldier, died a few years later. Educated at first by tutors, young Schuyler Otis entered Gloucester Academy at the age of 12 and afterwards matriculated at the College of William and Mary. During his senior year, he served as instructor in history, Latin and English. He won his Phi Beta Kappa key, but arranged his courses for the study of law, instead of working toward a degree.

After leaving college, he taught school in Accomac County, continued the study of law, and attended a summer law course at the University of Virginia. In 1899, he passed the State bar examination, and in 1900, began the practice of law in Newport News. Successful as a lawyer, he had a large private practice and served also on the legal staff of the Chesapeake and Ohio Railway. In 1914–15, he was vice-president of the Virginia Bar Association.

== Political career ==
When Congressman William A. Jones died, Bland received the convention's nomination as his successor. He entered Congress, July 3, 1918, and was regularly re-elected until his death. Only 10 members of the House of Representatives have had longer continuous service. Relatively early in his congressional career, Bland served as secretary of the United States Yorktown Sesquicentennial Commission, and worked to create a national park in Virginia's historic triangle (Jamestown, Yorktown, Williamsburg), which President Hoover authorized in December 1931 and which is now Colonial National Historical Park. Bland also worked to create the Fredericksburg and Spottsylvania Battlefield Memorial (now the Fredericksburg National Battlefield Historical Park, and to restore restoration of Washington's birthplace (now Ferry Farm). As chairman of the House Committee on Merchant Marine and Fisheries for 16 years (having served on the committee and its predecessor since 1922), Bland was largely responsible for the Merchant Marine Act of 1936, now considered the nation's basic maritime statute and which began the rehabilitation of American shipping. He was also a member of the Select Committee on Conservation of Wildlife Resources.

== Personal life ==
His wife and widow was the former Mary Crawford Putzel of Newport News.

== Death and legacy ==
Although he had announced his decision not to run for an additional term, Bland died of a stroke at the Naval Hospital in Bethesda, Maryland, while still a Congressman. He was survived by his widow (who died in 1969) and his sister Lola (who died in 1960). After a funeral at the First Presbyterian Church of Newport News, Bland was buried Greenlawn Memorial Park there.

The Schuyler Otis Bland Memorial Library, located at the United States Merchant Marine Academy, opened for service on March 17, 1969 and was named after Representative Bland. In announcing the selection of the name of the library, Mr. J.W. Gulick, Acting Maritime Administrator, stated: "Naming the new library for Schuyler Otis Bland places before all users of this facility the name of an outstanding leader in the development of basic policies and programs to maintain an effective, efficient American Merchant Marine…His contribution to creative, dynamic thinking in relation to the American Merchant Marine, and his association through the Merchant Marine Act, with the establishment of goals and policy vital today for our merchant marine make his name particularly appropriate for the Academy Library, as a source for knowledge and ideas concerning the American Merchant Marine." The ship SS Schuyler Otis Bland (T-AK-277) was also named to honor him.

=== Elections ===
- 1918; Bland was elected to the U.S. House of Representatives unopposed.
- 1920; Bland was re-elected with 79.77% of the vote, defeating Republican S. P. Powell and Independent Edward Schade.
- 1922; Bland was re-elected with 83.57% of the vote, defeating Republicans George N. Wise and J.J. Jones.
- 1924; Bland was re-elected unopposed.
- 1926; Bland was re-elected unopposed.
- 1928; Bland was re-elected unopposed
- 1930; Bland was re-elected with 91.04% of the vote, defeating Independent W. A. Rowe.
- 1932; Bland was elected into Virginia's now defunct at-large Congressional district with the rest of the Democratic slate.
- 1934; Bland was re-elected in the 1st District with 91.44% of the vote, defeating Socialist Arthur W. Sowalter, Independent Rowe, and Communist Addison Gayle.
- 1936; Bland was re-elected with 80.87% of the vote, defeating Republican William A. Dickinson and Communist Gayle.
- 1938; Bland was re-elected unopposed.
- 1940; Bland was re-elected unopposed.
- 1942; Bland was re-elected unopposed.
- 1944; Bland was re-elected with 81.2% of the vote, defeating Republican Walter Johnson.
- 1946; Bland was re-elected with 74.97% of the vote, defeating republican Johnson.
- 1948; Bland was re-elected with 79.98% of the vote, defeating Republican Stanley G. Adams and Socialist J. Luther Kibler.

== See also ==
- List of members of the United States Congress who died in office (1950–1999)

U.S. House of Representatives
Preceded by William A. Jones	Member of the U.S. House of Representatives from Virginia's 1st congressional district 1918–1933	Succeeded by District abolished Himself after district re-established in 1935
Preceded by District re-established John Sergeant Wise before district abolished in 1885	Member of the U.S. House of Representatives from Virginia's at-large congressional district 1933–1935	Succeeded by District abolished
Preceded by District re-established Himself before district abolished in 1933	Member of the U.S. House of Representatives from Virginia's 1st congressional district 1935–1950	Succeeded by Edward J. Robeson, Jr.
