= Will Jones =

Will Jones may refer to:

- Will Jones (racing driver) (1889–1972), American racecar driver
- Will Jones (baseball) (1896–?), American Negro leagues baseball player
- Will Jones (rugby union) (born 1998), Welsh rugby player
- Dub Jones (singer) (Will J. Jones, 1928–2000), American singer
- Will Jones (died 1922), lynched in Ellaville, Georgia, USA, see Lynching of Will Jones

== See also ==
- William Jones (disambiguation)
- Willie Jones (disambiguation)
- Bill Jones (disambiguation)
- Billy Jones (disambiguation)
