= United States House Committee on Insular Affairs =

The United States House Committee on Insular Affairs is a defunct committee of the U.S. House of Representatives.

The Treaty of Paris, signed on December 10, 1898, officially concluded the Spanish–American War. According to the provisions of the treaty, Spain ceded the Philippine Islands, Puerto Rico and Guam to the United States, and relinquished her sovereignty over Cuba. On January 1, 1899, the Spanish evacuated Cuba, and control of the island was assumed by a military governor who represented the United States. On December 8, 1899, the U.S. House established the Committee on Insular Affairs to consider "all matters (excepting those affecting the revenue and appropriations) pertaining to the islands which came to the United States through the treaty of 1899 with Spain, and to Cuba."

Just 6 days earlier, on December 6, 1899, the United States had acquired exclusive rights to certain islands in Samoa through an agreement with Britain and Germany. Subsequently, matters relating to American Samoa also came within the committee's jurisdiction. In 1902 the Republic of Cuba was established, and jurisdiction over matters concerning Cuba was transferred to the Committee on Foreign Affairs in 1906. Eventually, the jurisdiction of the Committee on Insular Affairs was expanded to cover the United States Virgin Islands which were purchased from Denmark by the treaty in 1916. In 1946 the committee was abolished and its responsibilities transferred to the Committee on Public Lands.

== Chairmen ==
Chair	Party	State	Start of Service	End of Service
Henry Allen Cooper	Republican	Wisconsin	1899	1909
Marlin Edgar Olmsted	Republican	Pennsylvania	1909	1911
William Atkinson Jones	Democratic	Virginia	1911	1918
Finis J. Garrett	Democratic	Tennessee	1918	1919
Horace Mann Towner	Republican	Iowa	1919	1923
Louis W. Fairfield	Republican	Indiana	1923	1925
Edgar Raymond Kiess	Republican	Pennsylvania	1925	1930
Harold Knutson	Republican	Minnesota	1930	1931
Butler B. Hare	Democratic	South Carolina	1931	1933
John McDuffie	Democratic	Alabama	1933	1935
Leo Kocialkowski	Democratic	Illinois	1935	1943
C. Jasper Bell	Democratic	Missouri	1943	1947
