= Murder of Jared Plesec =

2017 murder in Lakewood, Ohio

On the evening of December 2, 2017, in Cleveland, Ohio, United States, 27-year old William Jones shot 21-year-old Salvation Army worker Jared Plesec in the head, killing him. Plesec was a Bible study teacher at the Salvation Army. He was holding a copy of the Bible when he was shot in the head by Jones.

== Crime spree ==
Jared Plesec was 21 years old at the time he was fatally shot by William Jones in the lobby of his apartment complex. Plesec was recognized by community members for his devout faith and outreach work in the community. He worked with young people, encouraging them to attend church.

Jones made several statements after killing Plesec, screaming in the building lobby "Fuck Trump", "A life for a life" and "I did it fo y'all, man." These 4 minutes were filmed by a building resident and broadcast to Facebook Live.

After the murder of Plesec, Jones went on a crime spree in Cleveland, Ohio lasting 63 minutes. On December 11, 2017, Cuyahoga County Prosecutor Michael O'Malley said that the murder appeared to be "racially motivated" and announced that his office was working with the Federal Bureau of Investigation to determine whether federal hate crime laws had been violated.

== Sentencing ==
On April 17, 2018, Jones pleaded guilty to aggravated murder, felonious assault, attempted murder, burglary and other charges in order to avoid capital punishment.

Jones prepared and made an allocution statement before sentencing. He made a one-sentence apology to the family members of Jared Plesec. He then invoked the names of Trayvon Martin (killed by George Zimmerman), Tamir Rice, and the shooting of Timothy Russell and Malissa Williams (killed by Cleveland police). Plesec's family members groaned as Jones read the statement.

He said "It just seems, when a white life takes a black life, it's justified. Today you seek justice. I can't help but wonder if the shoe was on the other foot, would it be justified instead?" He also invoked the slogan "Black Lives Matter".

He finished the allocution statement by asking "Do black lives really matter, or are just not as important as others?" The sentencing judge replied only that "All lives matter" and added that the "attempt to try to justify the taking of Jared's life is really incomprehensible".

Jones was sentenced to life without parole at the conclusion of the sentencing hearing.

== Perpetrator ==
At the time of the murder, Jones was on a released supervision from prison after serving nearly two years for a previous armed carjacking.

== Legacy ==
In 2019 a lawsuit was filed against the management of the apartment complex where Plesec was shot. An attorney for the plaintiffs issued a statement that the Euclid Beach Villa Apartments where the crime took place had a record of "vicious assaults and other crimes". The plaintiffs say the buildings should have had more security.
