= Bill Jones (Australian footballer, born 1897) =

Australian rules footballer

Personal information
- Full name: Bill Jones
- Born: 19 September 1897
- Died: 11 July 1967 (aged 69)
- Height: 177 cm (5 ft 10 in)
- Weight: 81 kg (179 lb)

Playing career^{1}
Years	Club	Games (Goals)
1920	Geelong	4 (0)
- ^{1} Playing statistics correct to the end of 1920.

Bill Jones (19 September 1897 – 11 July 1967) was an Australian rules footballer who played with Geelong in the Victorian Football League (VFL).
