= 39th Virginia Infantry Regiment =

- Flag of Virginia, 1861
- Active: Summer 1861 – February 1862
- Disbanded: February 1862
- Country: Confederate States of America
- Allegiance: Virginia
- Branch: Confederate States Army
- Type: Regiment
- Role: Infantry
- Engagements: American Civil War

The 39th Virginia Infantry Regiment was an infantry regiment raised in Virginia for service in the Confederate States Army during the American Civil War. It fought mostly in Norfolk and on Virginia's Eastern Shore.

The 39th Virginia was organized during the summer of 1861 with eleven companies: eight infantry, two cavalry, and one artillery. The unit was attached to the Department of Norfolk and served on the Eastern Shore of Virginia. In November it was ordered to evacuate the peninsula but was unable to cross the Chesapeake Bay. Efforts failed to reorganize the regiment, and it disbanded on February 3, 1862. Many of the members were reformed into the 19th Virginia Heavy Artillery (Atkinson's). They served much of the war's remaining years in the batteries north and east of Richmond. In April, 1865, the unit was part of Lee's retreat to Appomattox. One of their final engagements was at Saylor's Creek where several members were captured.

Its commanders were Colonel Charles Smith, Lieutenant Colonel Louis C.H. Finney, and Major N.R. Cary.

== See also ==
- List of Virginia Civil War units
