= Billy Jones (artist) =

American-born Australian artist and poet

Billy Jones (1935–2012) was an American-born artist and poet, who immigrated to Australia in 1967 and settled in Kilcoy, Queensland.

== Personal life ==
In 1968 Billy Jones met and fell in love with Diane Kelly. They moved together to Caloundra, Queensland and eventually settled at Mary Smokes Creek. Kelly died in a car accident in June 1975.

== Works ==
Commencing shortly after Kelly's death in June 1975 and continuing until his own death in July 2012, Jones worked daily on his journal, in which he recorded observations and wrote poetry and sketches. He produced 167 volumes in total.

His published works include:

- Holocaust at Mary Smokes: poems 1975-83 (1983)
- The blue chair (1987)
- Backpocket poems (1988)
- Wren Lines: Selected Poems and Drawings Volume 1 (2006)
- Crazy bone: poems & drawings (2012)

The UNSW Canberra Library at the Australian Defence Force Academy holds a large collection of Bill Jones's journals and personal papers.

The Fryer Library, University of Queensland Library holds a large collection of Billy Jones's journals and personal papers.
