= Bill Jones (Australian footballer, born 1912) =

Australian rules footballer, born 1912

Personal information
- Full name: William Frederick Jones
- Born: 15 November 1912; Port Melbourne, Victoria
- Died: 30 March 1987 (aged 74); South Melbourne, Victoria
- Original team: Port Melbourne
- Height: 174 cm (5 ft 9 in)
- Weight: 70 kg (154 lb)

Playing career^{1}
Years	Club	Games (Goals)
1931–32	Carlton	6 (3)
1935–36	North Melbourne	10 (9)
Total		16 (12)
- ^{1} Playing statistics correct to the end of 1936.

William Frederick Jones (15 November 1912 – 30 March 1987) was an Australian rules footballer who played with Carlton and North Melbourne in the Victorian Football League (VFL).
