= Bill Jones (Australian footballer, born 1887) =

Australian rules footballer

Personal information
- Full name: Bill Jones
- Born: 11 May 1887
- Died: 26 October 1979 (aged 92)
- Height: 188 cm (6 ft 2 in)
- Weight: 90 kg (198 lb)

Playing career^{1}
Years	Club	Games (Goals)
1915	Geelong	3 (0)
- ^{1} Playing statistics correct to the end of 1915.

Bill Jones (11 May 1887 – 26 October 1979) was an Australian rules footballer who played with Geelong in the Victorian Football League (VFL).
