= William Jones (Welsh footballer, born 1876) =

Welsh footballer

Personal information
- Full name: William James Jones
- Date of birth: 1876
- Place of birth: Penrhiwceiber, Wales
- Date of death: May 1918 (aged 41–42)
- Place of death: Doiran, Macedonia
- Position: Half back

Youth career
- Mountain Ash Excelsior

Senior career*
Years	Team	Apps	(Gls)
????–1895	Mountain Ash		
1895–1896	Rogerstone		
1896–1901	Aberdare Athletic		
1901	Kettering	9	(0)
1901–1902	West Ham United	15	(0)
1902–1904	Aberaman Athletic		
1904–1906	Rogerstone		

International career
1901–1902	Wales	4	(0)
- * Club domestic league appearances and goals

William James Jones (1876 – 6 May 1918) was a Welsh international footballer who played his club football for Kettering and West Ham United of the Southern League. He was killed in action in Macedonia in the First World War.

== Football career ==
Jones was born in the village of Penrhiwceiber, near Aberdare and started his football career with Mountain Ash Excelsior. He progressed to the Mountain Ash first team, but when this team folded, he joined Rogerstone for a season. He joined Aberdare Athletic in 1896, becoming team captain in 1901. In March 1901, he became the first player from South Wales league football to be selected for Wales, when he played in the 1–1 draw with Scotland followed by a 6–0 defeat by England. (In the latter match, four goals were scored by Steve Bloomer.)

Described as "a sound tackler who played well within himself" who was "adept at feeding the wingmen", his transfer to Kettering in September 1901 was "much regretted" in his home town. He failed to settle at Kettering and in December he moved to West Ham United in a swap with Peter Kyle. He was relatively successful at the East London club, with only two defeats in 15 Southern League appearances.

In the summer of 1902, he returned to Wales joining Aberaman Athletic. At the end of his first season there, he helped Aberaman become the first club from South Wales to reach the final of the Welsh Cup, although the final was a one-sided affair with Wrexham winning 8–0. From 1904 to 1906, Jones finished his career at Rogerstone.

Jones made four appearances for Wales in official international matches.

== Death ==
In World War I, Jones was a private of the Royal Welch Fusiliers. He was killed in action and buried at the Doiran Military Cemetery in the north of Greece, near the south-east shore of Lake Doiran.
