= Bill Jones (Australian footballer, born 1891) =

Australian rules footballer (1891–1961)

Personal information
- Full name: William Henry Jones
- Born: 29 January 1891; Williamstown, Victoria
- Died: 2 February 1961 (aged 70); East Melbourne, Victoria
- Original team: California Gully (BFL)
- Height: 179 cm (5 ft 10 in)
- Weight: 87 kg (192 lb)
- Position: Ruck

Playing career^{1}
Years	Club	Games (Goals)
1911–12	Richmond	19 (6)
- ^{1} Playing statistics correct to the end of 1912.

William Henry Jones (29 January 1891 – 2 February 1961) was an Australian rules footballer who played with Richmond in the Victorian Football League (VFL).

== Family ==
The son of former Williamstown footballer William Henry Jones (1862–1929) and Alice Jones (1866–1955), née Hall, William Henry Jones was born in Williamstown on 29 January 1891.

== Football ==
Jones commenced his football career at St Killian's (Bendigo), playing in premiership teams in both 1908 and 1909 before moving to senior ranks in 1910 with California Gully in the Bendigo Football League where he gained a reputation as an excellent mark but inconsistent kick.

In 1911 he joined Richmond in the Victorian Football League and made his debut in their Round 1 clash with Collingwood. He scored two goals in the loss to Carlton in Round 5, where again it was noted that “Jones again showed up well in the matter of marking, but failed lamentably in shooting for goal.”

In early 1913 Jones moved to fellow VFL club Melbourne after failing to gain a place in Richmond’s team in the first few weeks of the season but he never played a senior game for Melbourne. Later that season he moved to the Ballarat Football League and played with Golden Square.

In 1914, Jones transferred to North Melbourne in the Victorian Football Association (VFA).
