= Tucker Hill, Virginia =

Unincorporated community in Virginia, US

Coordinates: 38°03′59″N 76°35′39″W

Tucker Hill is an unincorporated community in Westmoreland County, in the U. S. state of Virginia.

The Yeocomico Church was listed on the National Register of Historic Places in 1969.
