= Thomas J. Downing =

American politician (1867–1927)

Colonel Thomas J. Downing

Member of the Virginia Senate
- In office January 14, 1920 – December 24, 1927
- Preceded by: C. Harding Walker
- Succeeded by: Robert O. Norris Jr.
- Constituency: 34th district (1920‍–‍1924); 31st district (1924‍–‍1927)

Personal details
- Born: Thomas Joseph Downing; May 25, 1867 Lancaster, Virginia, U.S.
- Died: December 24, 1927 (aged 60) Lancaster, Virginia, U.S.
- Party: Democratic
- Spouse: Estelle Chilton
- Children: 2
- Relatives: Thomas N. Downing (grandson)
- Education: Randolph–Macon College; University of Virginia
- Occupation: Lawyer; politician

Thomas Joseph Downing (May 25, 1867 – December 24, 1927) was an American lawyer and politician, who served in the Virginia Senate from 1920 until his death in office in 1927, shortly after he was reelected to a third term. Previously, he served on the staff of Governor Henry Carter Stuart, granting him use of the honorific title of "Colonel". Representing a district composed of King George, Richmond, Westmoreland, Lancaster, and Northumberland counties, he was notable for sponsoring a bill to construct a bridge over the Rappahannock River at Tappahannock, Virginia. The bill was signed into law, and the span was designated the Thomas J. Downing Bridge in Downing's honor.

Downing's grandson, Thomas N. Downing, served in the United States House of Representatives from 1959 to 1957, representing Virginia's 1st congressional district.
