= William Jones (soldier) =

Irish-born American soldier (1836–1864)

William Jones (1836 – May 12, 1864) was an Irish-born American soldier who received the Medal of Honor for his actions in the American Civil War.

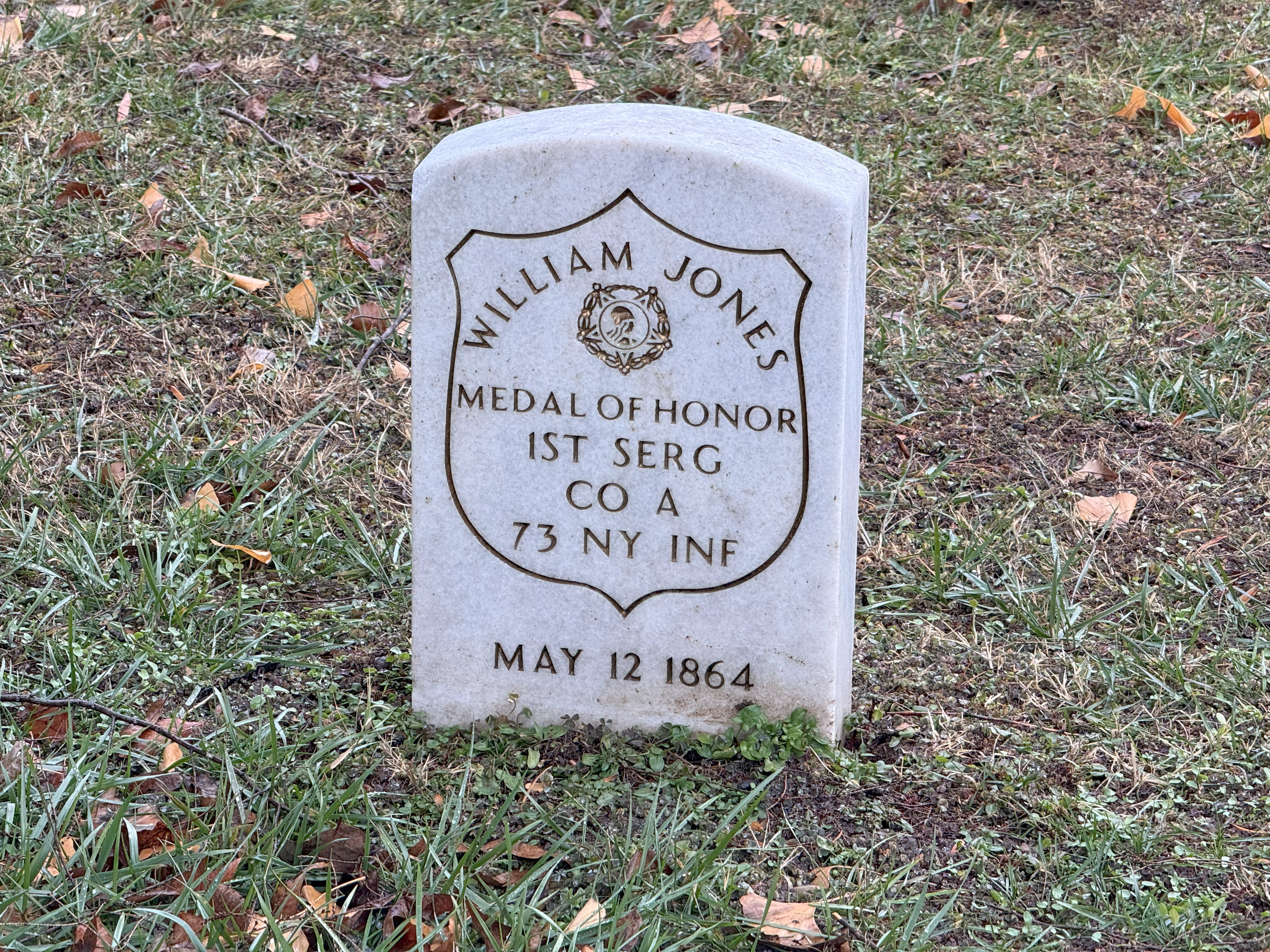
First Sergeant William Jones Headstone at Fredericksburg National Military Park, Fredericksburg, Virginia.

== Biography ==
Jones was born in Wicklow, Ireland, in 1836. He served as first sergeant in Company A of the 73rd New York Volunteer Infantry Regiment. He earned his medal in action at the Battle of Spotsylvania Court House, Virginia on May 12, 1864. Jones was killed in action on May 12, 1864, and thus his medal was award posthumously on December 1, 1864. He is now buried in Fredericksburg and Spotsylvania National Military Park in Fredericksburg, Virginia.

== Medal of Honor Citation ==
For extraordinary heroism on 12 May 1864, in action at Spotsylvania, Virginia, for capture of flag of 65th Virginia Infantry (Confederate States of America).
