= Thomas N. Downing =

American politician

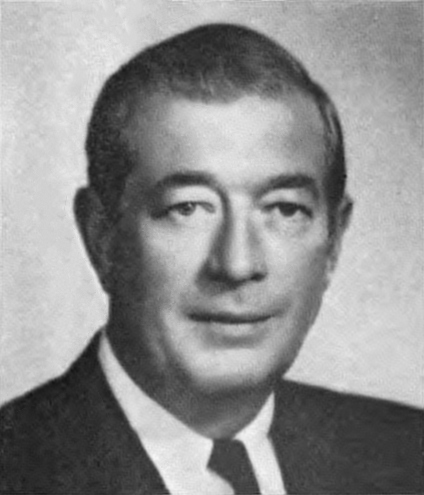

Member of the U.S. House of Representatives from Virginia's 1st district
- In office January 3, 1959 – January 3, 1977
- Preceded by: Edward J. Robeson Jr.
- Succeeded by: Paul S. Trible

Chairman of the House Select Committee on Assassinations
- In office September 17, 1976 – January 3, 1977
- Preceded by: Position established
- Succeeded by: Henry B. González

Personal details
- Born: Thomas Nelms Downing; February 1, 1919 Newport News, Virginia, U.S.
- Died: October 23, 2001 (aged 82) Newport News, Virginia, U.S.
- Resting place: Peninsula Memorial Park Cemetery, Newport News
- Party: Democratic
- Relatives: Thomas J. Downing (grandfather)
- Education: Virginia Military Institute (BS); University of Virginia (LLB)

Military service
- Branch/service: United States Army; Army Ground Forces
- Years of service: 1942‍–‍1946
- Rank: Captain
- Unit: 3rd Cavalry Reconnaissance Squadron, 3rd Cavalry Group (Mechanized)
- Battles/wars: World War II; European theater
- Awards: Silver Star

Thomas Nelms Downing (February 1, 1919 – October 23, 2001) was an American lawyer and politician who served nine terms as a Democratic Congressman from Virginia's 1st congressional district from 1959 to 1977.

He was most notable for his role as chairman of the House Select Committee on Assassinations during his time in Congress.

== Biography ==
Downing was born and raised in Newport News, Virginia. He attended Newport News High School, and graduated from Virginia Military Institute in 1940. After serving in the United States Army from 1942 to 1946, he attended and graduated from the University of Virginia Law School in 1948. He practiced as a lawyer, as well as a substitute judge of the municipal court of Warwick, Virginia.

== Congress ==
In 1958 he was elected as a Democrat to Congress and was re-elected eight times, before declining to run in 1976. Downing served 18 years in Congress prior to retiring in 1977.

=== Elections ===
- 1958; Downing was elected to the U. S. House of Representatives unopposed.
- 1960; Downing was re-elected unopposed.
- 1962; Downing was re-elected unopposed.
- 1964; Downing was re-elected with 78.71% of the vote, defeating Republican Wayne C. Thiessen.
- 1966; Downing was re-elected unopposed.
- 1968; Downing was re-elected with 72.96% of the vote, defeating Republican James S. Stafford and Independent J. Cornelius Fauntleroy.
- 1970; Downing was re-elected unopposed.
- 1972; Downing was re-elected with 78.09% of the vote, defeating Republican Kenneth D. Wells.
- 1974; Downing was re-elected unopposed.

== House Select Committee on Assassinations ==
Downing was appointed Chairman of the House Select Committee on Assassinations by Carl Albert, the Speaker of the United States House of Representatives. The committee was tasked to look into evidence that was not available to the Warren Commission during its investigation of the assassination of John F. Kennedy. Upon his retirement from Congress in 1977, Louis Stokes succeeded Downing as chairman.

Downing stated before and after the HSCA's investigation that he believed there was a conspiracy to assassinate Kennedy. He pushed for a House committee to investigate the assassination nearly two years before its formation. In August 1976, he released affidavits from two men who stated that Richard Nixon approved the plan of a right-wing Cuban exile to "eliminate" left-wing Cuban exiles after the Bay of Pigs invasion. Downing said that their statements raised the possibility that right-wing Cubans killed Kennedy. He penned the introduction to the 1976 edition of Robert J. Groden and Peter F. Model's book JFK: The Case for Conspiracy.

Downing said that he was skeptical that Lee Harvey Oswald could accurately fire a bolt-action rifle within a short span of time, and he believed the Zapruder film of the assassination showed that Kennedy was struck from the front and the rear. According to a theory provided by Downing, one which he said was without evidence and based on speculation, anti-Castro Cuban exiles killed Kennedy due to his failure to support them after the 1961 Bay of Pigs invasion. Downing stated that they expected pro-Castro Cubans would be blamed for the assassination in retaliation for the attempted assassination of Fidel Castro by United States agents. Downing said: "I am firmly convinced, I am sincerely convinced, that more than one person was shooting at President Kennedy in Dallas that day. It is so obvious to me."

Downing described JFK, Oliver Stone's 1991 film about the assassination of Kennedy, as "implausible". He said: "It's impossible to tell where fact stops and fiction starts, it blends in so well."

Robert P. Gemberling, head of the FBI's investigation of the assassination for thirteen years after the release of the Warren Commission's report, said in 1976 that Downing and his successor, Henry B. Gonzalez, had "preconceived conspiracy theories".

== Later life and death ==
He died from the complications of intestinal surgery at the age of 82, and is interred in Peninsula Memorial Park Cemetery, Newport News, Virginia.

U.S. House of Representatives
Preceded by Edward J. Robeson Jr.	Member of the U.S. House of Representatives from Virginia's 1st congressional district 1959–1977	Succeeded by Paul S. Trible
