= William Allen Jones =

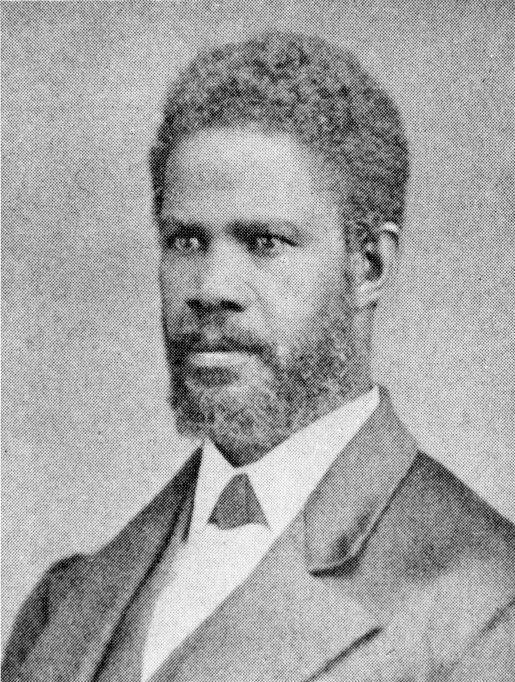
- Born: William Allen Jones c. 1831; Raleigh, North Carolina, USA
- Died: 1897; Barkerville, British Columbia, Canada
- Education: Oberlin College
- Occupation: Dentist

William Allen Jones (c. 1831 – 1897) was a Canadian dentist and miner. He was the first practicing dentist in British Columbia under the British Columbia Dental Act.

== Early life and education ==
Jones was born in 1831 in Raleigh, North Carolina to Allen Jones and Temperance Jones. He had five siblings: James Munroe, John Craven, Elias Toussaint, Sophia, and another sibling whose name is unknown. William's father, Allen Jones, bought his family's freedom in North Carolina for five thousand dollars. Allen attempted to establish a school for Black children, but it was burned down repeatedly by local white residents. The family moved to Oberlin, Ohio afterwards. Jones graduated from Oberlin College with a Bachelor of Arts in 1857.

== Career and later life ==
Jones moved to California after graduation, along with his brothers Elias and John, who also graduated from Oberlin College. The Jones brothers moved to Salt Spring Island, Colony of Vancouver Island in 1859 along with many other African-Americans under the increasing threat of California becoming a slave state. William and Elias soon headed for Barkerville and participated in the Cariboo Gold Rush as miners while John remained on Salt Spring Island as a teacher. William Jones returned to the United States with Elias after the American Civil War ended in 1865 to continue his dental studies at Oberlin College. Elias opted to stay in the United States, but William soon returned to Barkerville.

Jones began practicing dentistry after returning to Barkerville, opening a dental practice in 1876. He became known as the "Barkerville Dentist", earning the nickname "Painless Jones". He advertised his dental services in The Cariboo Sentinel as "painless dentistry", and used medicines to make the process less painful for his clients. No license was required to practice at this time, so Jones continued to practice until 1886 when the Government of British Columbia introduced a new Dental Act. Jones quickly obtained his license to practice dentistry under the new act on June 26, 1886, making him the first person to be granted license to practice dentistry under British Columbia's first iteration of dental profession regulations.

Jones died of pneumonia in 1897 and is buried in the Williams Creek cemetery. Barkerville has since been restored as a National Historic Site of Canada. Jones's dental office is featured on Barkerville's main street, with chair and instruments on display. Jones's dental office completed reconstruction in 1961, with the British Columbia Dental Association being involved through the donation of equipment and assistance in exhibition development.
