= Bill Jones (Australian footballer, born 1920) =

Australian rules footballer

Personal information
- Full name: William Henry Jones
- Born: 20 December 1920; Fitzroy North, Victoria
- Died: 30 July 1986 (aged 65); Mirboo North, Victoria
- Original team: Alphington
- Height: 175 cm (5 ft 9 in)
- Weight: 71 kg (157 lb)

Playing career^{1}
Years	Club	Games (Goals)
1941	Fitzroy	1 (0)
- ^{1} Playing statistics correct to the end of 1941.

William Henry Jones (20 December 1920 – 30 July 1986) was an Australian rules footballer who played with Fitzroy in the Victorian Football League (VFL).
