= William Atkinson Jones =

American politician

W.A. Jones
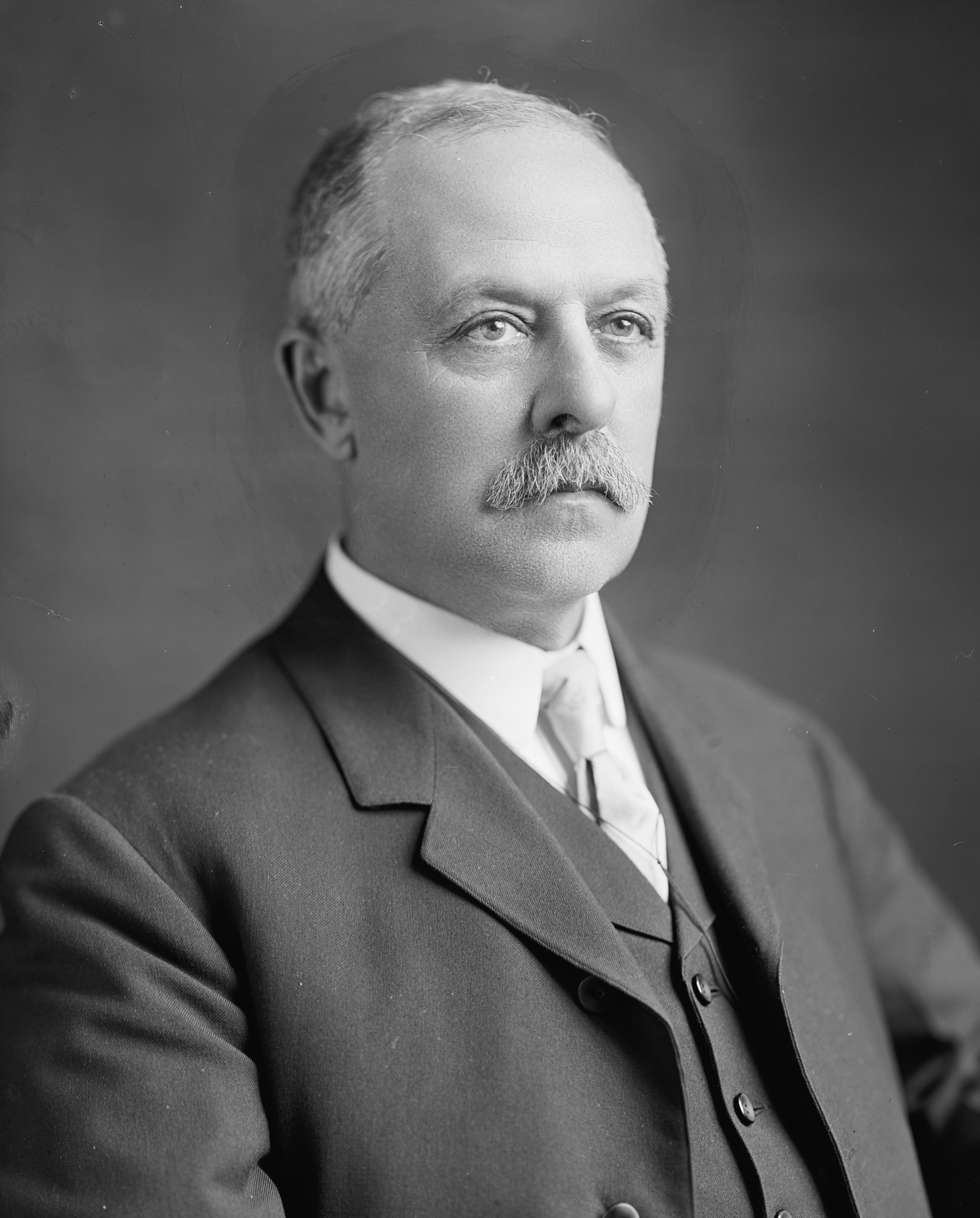

29th Dean of the United States House of Representatives
- In office December 10, 1914 – April 17, 1918
- Preceded by: Sereno E. Payne
- Succeeded by: Henry Allen Cooper; Frederick H. Gillett

Chairman of the House Insular Affairs Committee
- In office March 4, 1911 – April 17, 1918
- Preceded by: Marlin Edgar Olmsted
- Succeeded by: Horace Mann Towner

Member of the U.S. House of Representatives from Virginia's 1st district
- In office March 4, 1891 – April 17, 1918
- Preceded by: Thomas H. B. Browne
- Succeeded by: S. Otis Bland

Personal details
- Born: William Atkinson Jones; March 21, 1849 Warsaw, Virginia, U.S.
- Died: April 17, 1918 (aged 69) Washington, D.C., U.S.
- Resting place: St. John's Episcopal Church Cemetery in Warsaw, VA; 37.957901°N 76.755226°W
- Party: Democratic
- Spouse: Claude Douglas Motley
- Children: William Atkinson Jones
- Education: University of Virginia
- Profession: Lawyer, legislator

William Atkinson Jones (March 21, 1849 – April 17, 1918) was an American lawyer and politician who served as a member of the U.S. House of Representatives from 1891 to 1918 from the first district of the Commonwealth of Virginia.

He was author of the Jones Act, which granted independence to the Philippines after a period of U.S. control.

== Early life ==
Jones was born in Warsaw, Virginia. U.S. on March 21, 1849. His great-grandfather, Joseph Jones, was a general in the Revolutionary War, a friend of Lafayette, and subsequently postmaster of Petersburg, Virginia by appointment of Thomas Jefferson. Thomas Jones, the son of Joseph, married Mary Lee, the daughter of Richard Lee, long a member of the Virginia House of Burgesses from Westmoreland County, a first cousin of the famous Richard Henry Lee; and from this marriage was born Thomas Jones II, his father who married Anne Seymour Trowbridge of Plattsburgh, New York. James Trowbridge, his maternal grandfather, was recognized by the Congress for his gallantry at the Battle of Plattsburgh in 1814.

== Education ==
His boyhood fell during the American Civil War. His father, a former soldier, lawyer, and a judge entered him as a cadet at the Virginia Military Institute in Lexington in the fall of 1864, where he remained until the evacuation of Richmond, serving as occasion required with the corps of that famous institute in defense of the capital of his State. Thus, as a boy of 16 he did arduous and valiant military service. He was then placed in Coleman's School, at Fredericksburg from which he entered the University of Virginia at Charlottesville in October, 1868. He graduated with distinction in its School of Law in June, 1870. He was also a noted athlete in school.

He was admitted to the bar in 1870 and commenced practice in Warsaw, Virginia. He became a Commonwealth attorney for several years.

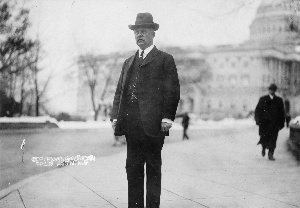
Jones standing before the Capitol Building

== Politics ==
Jones became active in the Democratic Party politics and served as a delegate to the Democratic National Convention in 1880, 1896, and 1900. He was elected to thirteen consecutive Congresses beginning in 1891. From 1911 to 1918, he served as Chairman of the House Committee on Insular Affairs, which had jurisdiction over areas including the Philippines and Puerto Rico.

=== Jones Act ===
He is best remembered as the House sponsor of the Jones Act or the Philippine Autonomy Act, which promised ultimate independence to the Philippines. Jones argued that it was beneficial to the United States to grant independence to the Philippines, as the costs of maintaining and defending the Philippines exceeded the economic benefits of possessing the islands.

He also sponsored the Jones-Shafroth Act, which modified the Organic Act of Puerto Rico and conferred United States citizenship on Puerto Ricans.

=== Elections ===
| Election year | Percentage of Votes | Opponents |
|---|---|---|
| 1890 | 54.06 | Republican I. Bayly Browne. |
| 1892 | 56.20 | Republicans Orres A. Browne and John W. Elliott. |
| 1894 | 60.11 | Republican J.J. McDonald, Independent C.B. Morton, and Progressive Party Francis A. Bristow. |
| 1896 | 58.42 | Republican Walter B. Tyler, Progressive Edward J. Wuder, and Socialist Labor Samuel D. Shazier. |
| 1898 | 66.50 | Republican Joseph A. Bristow and Progressive H. L. Crockett. |
| 1900 | 64.13 | Republican James M. Stubbs and Progressive H. L. Crockett. |
| 1902 | 72.77 | Republican Malcolm A. Coles. |
| 1904 | 77.05 | Republican Josephus Trader. |
| 1906 | 81.69 | Republican R. S. Bristow. |
| 1908 | 74.47 | Republican George N. Wise, Independent Republican W. L. Jones, and Socialist Charles Rudolph. |
| 1910 | 79.90 | Republican Wise, Socialist F. L. Townsend, and Socialist Labor Edward Schade. |
| 1912 | 91.02 | Socialist T. E. Coleman and Socialist Labor Godfrey Kinder. |
| 1914 | 93.04 | Socialists Coleman and Benjamin F. Gunter and Socialist Labor Godfrey Kinder. |
| 1916 | 76.49 | Republican William W. Butzner, Socialist C. Campbell, and Socialist Labor John Bader. |

== Family ==
William Atkinson Jones was married to Claude Douglas Motley (b. 1864) of James, Virginia on January 23, 1889 in Lynchburg, Virginia. The couple had a son, also named William Atkinson Jones, and a daughter, Anne Seymour. William Jr. became a lawyer like his father and served in World Wars I & II. His grandson William A. Jones III also pursued a military career, and was awarded the Medal of Honor during the Vietnam War.

== Death ==
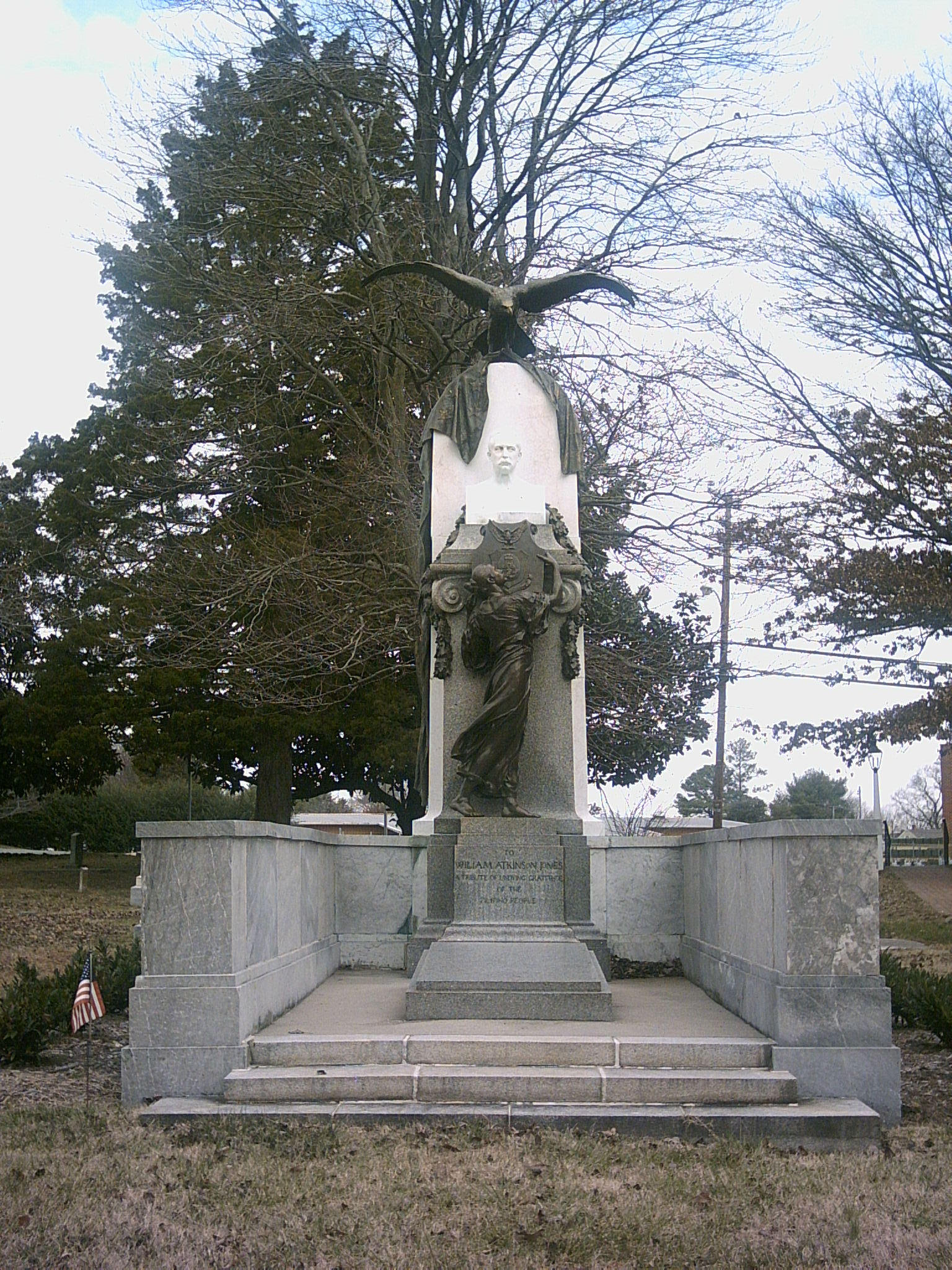
Grave of William Atkinson Jones

On April 7, 1918, Jones was attacked by paralysis and was taken to George Washington University Hospital in Washington, D.C. He remained unconscious from the day of the attack till he died on April 17, 1918. He was buried at the graveyard of St. John's Episcopal Church in Warsaw on April 19. The monument on his grave was paid for by the citizens of the Philippines as a token of gratitude for his support of their independence by authoring the Philippine Autonomy Act enacted in 1916.

His personal and official papers were donated to the Special Collections Library of the University of Virginia and are open for research.

== Memorials ==
Jones was well loved all over the Philippines for his work for the passage of the law that bears his name. A major bridge in Manila, Jones Bridge, was named after him. Construction of the bridge was started by the Americans in 1916 to replace the historical bridge, Puente de España (Bridge of Spain), one block upriver after it was destroyed by flood in 1914. At the time of Jones's death, the new bridge, which was still under construction, was named in his honor. The Philippine Legislature had appropriated funds for the erection of a mausoleum over his tomb in Warsaw, his home town, and a monument in Manila.

The new municipality of Jones, Isabela was named in his honor when it was inaugurated in 1921. The municipality of Banton, Romblon was renamed as Jones in 1918 in his honor, but was reverted to its old name in 1959.

== See also ==
- List of members of the United States Congress who died in office (1900–1949)

== Sources ==
- 65th Congress (1919). "William Atkinson Jones Memorial Addresses". The Joint Committee on Printing, Washington.

U.S. House of Representatives
| Preceded by Thomas H. B. Browne | Member of the U.S. House of Representatives from Virginia's 1st congressional district 1891–1918 | Succeeded by S. Otis Bland |
Political offices
| Preceded by Marlin Edgar Olmsted; Pennsylvania | Chairman of House Insular Affairs Committee; 1911–1918 | Succeeded by Horace Mann Towner; Iowa |
