= William H. Jones (South Carolina politician) =

American politician

Member of the South Carolina Senate from Georgetown County
- In office 1872–1876
- Preceded by: J. F. Beckman
- Succeeded by: Bruce H. Williams

Member of the South Carolina House of Representatives from Georgetown County
- In office 1868–1872

Personal details
- Born: Philadelphia, Pennsylvania, United States
- Party: Republican

William H. Jones Jr. (c. 1842 - ?) was a teacher, judge, colonel in the state militia, election commissioner, and state legislator in South Carolina. He represented Georgetown County, South Carolina in the South Carolina House of Representatives from 1868 to 1872. He served in the South Carolina Senate from 1872 to 1876.

He was born in and grew up in Philadelphia. He had an intense rivalry with fellow legislator James A. Bowley, who was also African American.
