= William Henry Jones =

English Anglican priest, antiquarian and author

William Henry Jones (1817–1885), William Henry Rich Jones from 1883, was an English Anglican priest, antiquarian and author.

== Life ==
The eldest son of William Jones, chief secretary of the Religious Tract Society, he was born in the parish of Christchurch, Blackfriars, London, on 31 August 1817. He was educated at a school in Totteridge, Hertfordshire, at King's College, London, and at Magdalen Hall, Oxford. At Oxford he won the Boden scholarship for Sanskrit in 1837, and graduated B.A. 1840, and M.A. in 1844.

In 1841, Jones became curate of St Andrew, Holborn, and in the following year, rector of St Martin-in-the-Fields; in 1845 he became incumbent of St. James's, Curtain Road, Shoreditch. In 1851 he left London as vicar of Bradford-on-Avon in Wiltshire, where he rediscovered the Anglo-Saxon church. From 1861 to 1873, he acted as rural dean of Potterne, Wiltshire. In 1872, he was appointed surrogate of the diocese of Salisbury and canon of Salisbury.

Jones was elected a fellow of the Society of Antiquaries of London in 1849. He died suddenly at the vicarage, Bradford-on-Avon, on 28 October 1885.

== Works ==
Jones wrote ecclesiological and antiquarian works:

- Memorials of W. Jones of the Religious Tract Society, 1857.
- Domesday Book for Wiltshire (translated and edited with notes), Bath, 1865.
- Diocesan Conferences, 1868.
- Early Annals of the Episcopate in Wilts and Dorset, 1871.
- The Life and Times of St. Aldhelm, first Bishop of Sherborne (A.D. 705–9), Bath, 1874.
- On the Names of Places in Wiltshire (n.d.)
- An Account of the Saxon Church of St. Laurence, Bradford-on-Avon, Bath, 1878.
- Canon or Prebendary: a Plea for the Non-Residentiary Members of Chapters (a letter to the Dean of Salisbury), 1878.
- Fasti Ecclesiæ Sarisberiensis: a History of the Cathedral Body at Sarum, Salisbury, 1879.
- Annals of the Church of Salisbury, a Diocesan History, S.P.C.K., 1880.

With Edward Dayman, Jones edited the Statutes of Salisbury Cathedral (1882). He also edited the Registers of St. Osmund for the Rolls Series, vol. i. 1883, vol. ii. 1884. He wrote articles in the Magazine of the Wiltshire Archæological Society, of which he was elected vice-president in 1882; and at the time of his death he had collected for the Rolls Series documents relating to the diocese and city of Salisbury.

== Family ==
Jones was twice married, and left a widow, one son, and three daughters. In 1883, he prefixed his wife's maiden name, Rich, to his surname. His brother was Samuel Flood Jones (1826–95), a Precentor at Westminster Abbey.
