= Bill Jones (basketball, born 1936) =

American basketball head coach and athletic director

Biographical details
- Born: May 12, 1936; Lexington, Alabama, U.S.
- Died: August 19, 2008 (aged 72); Florence, Alabama, U.S.

Playing career
- 1954–1957: North Alabama
- Position: Guard

Coaching career (HC unless noted)
- 196?–1969: Various high schools
- 1969–1974: Montevallo
- 1974–1988: North Alabama

Administrative career (AD unless noted)
- 1988–1994: North Alabama

Head coaching record
- Overall: 251–141 (college)

Accomplishments and honors

Championships
- NCAA Division II (1979); 4× NCAA Division II Final Fours (1977, 1979, 1980, 1984); 3× Gulf South regular season (1977, 1981, 1984); 3× Gulf South Tournament (1981, 1984, 1988)

Awards
- 2× Gulf South Coach of the Year

William L. Jones (May 12, 1936 – August 19, 2008) was an American college basketball head coach and athletic director. He is best known for leading the North Alabama Lions men's basketball program from 1974 to 1988, winning the 1979 NCAA Division II national championship, as well as appearances in three other Final Fours. The 1978–79 North Alabama team was the first college basketball team from the state of Alabama to win a national championship. After 14 head coaching seasons in which he won three conference regular season championships, three conference tournaments, made six NCAA Tournaments, and compiled a 251–141 overall record, Jones retired to become North Alabama's first full-time athletic director in 1988. He led the school's athletics for six years before retiring in August 1994. On August 19, 2008, Jones died in Glenwood Rehabilitation and Convalescent Center in Florence, Alabama. He was posthumously inducted into the Alabama Sports Hall of Fame in 2013.

He was the grandfather of former National Football League player Barrett Jones.
