= William A. Jones III =

US Air Force officer and Medal of Honor recipient

William Atkinson Jones III
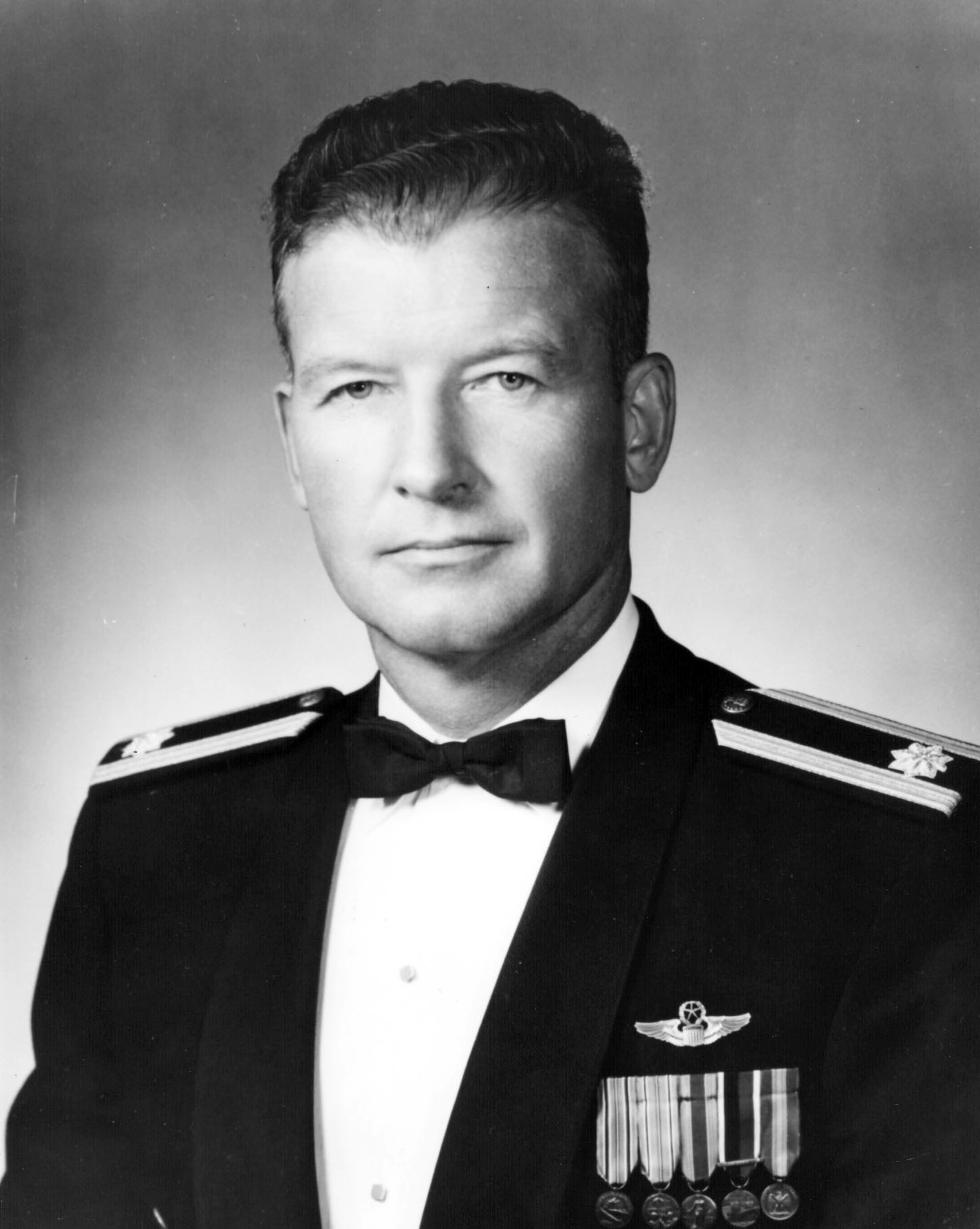
- Born: May 31, 1922; Norfolk, Virginia, US
- Died: November 15, 1969 (aged 47); Near Woodbridge, Virginia, US
- Burial place: Saint Johns Episcopal Church Cemetery, Warsaw, Virginia
- Relatives: William Atkinson Jones (grandfather)
- Military career
- Allegiance: United States
- Branch: United States Air Force
- Service years: 1945–1969
- Rank: Colonel
- Commands: 602d Special Operations Squadron
- Conflicts: Vietnam War
- Awards: Medal of Honor; Air Medal

William Atkinson Jones III (May 31, 1922 – November 15, 1969) was a United States Air Force officer and a recipient of the United States military's highest decoration—the Medal of Honor—for his actions in the Vietnam War.

== Biography ==
Born in Virginia, he was the grandson of US congressman William Atkinson Jones. Jones joined the Air Force after graduating from West Point with the class of 1945. By September 1, 1968 was serving as a lieutenant colonel in the 602d Special Operations Squadron, operating out of Nakhon Phanom Royal Thai Air Force Base, Thailand. On that day, Jones participated in a mission to rescue a downed pilot near Đồng Hới, North Vietnam.

Jones led a flight of four A-1H Skyraider aircraft escorting two helicopters sent out to rescue the pilot of an F-4 Phantom downed about 20 miles (32 km) northwest of Đồng Hới.

Arriving over the area, he made several low passes across a valley to find the pilot and pinpoint enemy gun positions. On one pass, he felt an explosion beneath his aircraft and his cockpit was filled with smoke. After the smoke cleared, he continued his search and finally spotted the downed pilot near a towering rock formation. Enemy gunners occupying a position near the top of the formation opened fire on the propeller-driven Skyraider.

Jones realized that the gun position had to be destroyed before a rescue could be made and that strikes against it would endanger the survivor unless his location was known. He attacked with cannon and rocket fire while relaying the pilot's location by radio. While making his second pass, his aircraft was hit and cockpit was set ablaze. He sought to eject but the damaged extraction system only jettisoned the canopy without pulling him from the cockpit. At the same time his transmissions to the rescue force were being blocked by repeated calls from other aircraft that he bail out. Before the fire died out, Jones was badly burned and his radio transmitters were disabled.

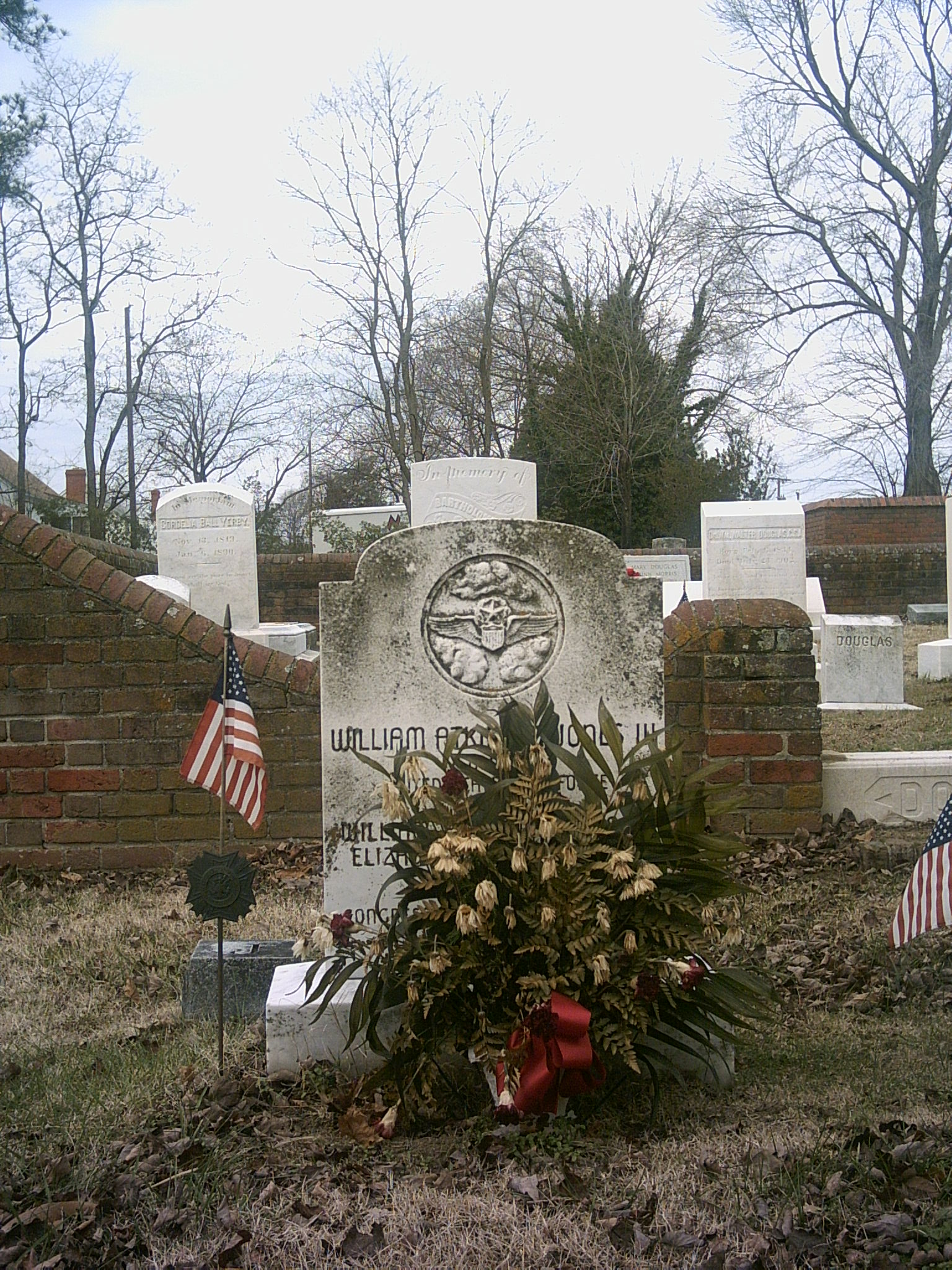
Grave of William A. Jones III

He chose to return to base to report the downed pilot's exact location. Despite his severe burns, he landed his damaged aircraft safely, and insisted on passing on the vital information before receiving medical treatment. The downed pilot was rescued later that day. Jones survived his wounds and was promoted to full colonel, and died the next year in an aircraft accident in Virginia. Aged 47 at his death, he was buried in Saint John's Episcopal Church Cemetery, Warsaw, Virginia. His Medal of Honor was presented to his widow by President Richard Nixon on August 6, 1970, during a ceremony at the White House.

(Taken from U.S. Air Force Biography)

Jones also wrote the book "Maxims for Men-at-Arms", which was published only days before his death.

== Awards and decorations ==

US Air Force Command Pilot Badge
Medal of Honor	Purple Heart	Air Medal
Air Force Commendation Medal	American Campaign Medal	Asiatic-Pacific Campaign Medal
World War II Victory Medal	Army of Occupation Medal	National Defense Service Medal with service star
Vietnam Service Medal with bronze campaign star	Air Force Longevity Service Award with four bronze oak leaf clusters	Small Arms Expert Marksmanship Ribbon
Philippine Independence Medal	Republic of Vietnam Gallantry Cross Unit Citation	Republic of Vietnam Campaign Medal

=== Medal of Honor citation ===
Colonel William Jones' official Medal of Honor citation reads:

For conspicuous gallantry and intrepidity in action at the risk of his life above and beyond the call of duty. Col. William Jones distinguished himself as the pilot of an A-1H Skyraider aircraft near Dong Hoi, North Vietnam. On that day, as the on-scene commander in the attempted rescue of a downed U.S. pilot, Col. William Jones' aircraft was repeatedly hit by heavy and accurate antiaircraft fire. On one of his low passes, Col. William Jones felt an explosion beneath his aircraft and his cockpit rapidly filled with smoke. With complete disregard of the possibility that his aircraft might still be burning, he unhesitatingly continued his search for the downed pilot. On this pass, he sighted the survivor and a multiple-barrel gun position firing at him from near the top of a karst formation. He could not attack the gun position on that pass for fear he would endanger the downed pilot. Leaving himself exposed to the gun position, Col. William Jones attacked the position with cannon and rocket fire on 2 successive passes. On his second pass, the aircraft was hit with multiple rounds of automatic weapons fire. One round impacted the Yankee Extraction System rocket mounted directly behind the headrest, igniting the rocket. His aircraft was observed to burst into flames in the center fuselage section, with flames engulfing the cockpit area. He pulled the extraction handle, jettisoning the canopy. The influx of fresh air made the fire burn with greater intensity for a few moments, but since the rocket motor had already burned, the extraction system did not pull Col.William Jones from the aircraft. Despite searing pains from severe burns sustained on his arms, hands, neck, shoulders, and face, Col. William Jones pulled his aircraft into a climb and attempted to transmit the location of the downed pilot and the enemy gun position to the other aircraft in the area. His calls were blocked by other aircraft transmissions repeatedly directing him to bail out and within seconds his transmitters were disabled and he could receive only on 1 channel. Completely disregarding his injuries, he elected to fly his crippled aircraft back to his base and pass on essential information for the rescue rather than bail out. Col. William Jones successfully landed his heavily damaged aircraft and passed the information to a debriefing officer while on the operating table. As a result of his heroic actions and complete disregard for his personal safety, the downed pilot was rescued later in the day. Col. William Jones' profound concern for his fellow man at the risk of his life, above and beyond the call of duty, are in keeping with the highest traditions of the U.S. Air Force and reflect great credit upon himself and the Armed Forces of his country.

== See also ==
- List of Medal of Honor recipients
- List of Medal of Honor recipients for the Vietnam War
