= William A. Jones (writer) =

- Born: 1947 (age 78–79); North Wales
- Citizenship: United Kingdom
- Education: Sheffield University
- Occupation: Author
- Known for: Author of MindWealth: building Personal Wealth from Intellectual Property Right.

William A. Jones also known as Bill Jones (born 1947), is a British writer known as the author of MindWealth: building Personal Wealth from Intellectual Property Right. He also authored other books which have been published on various platforms.
