= William H. Jones (Mississippi politician) =

American politician

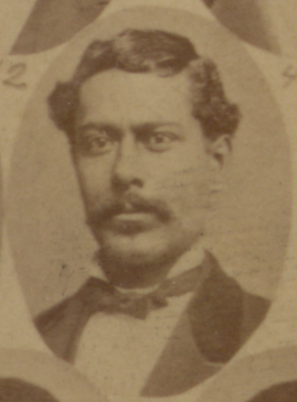
- Official portrait, 1874

Member of the Mississippi House of Representatives from Issaquena County
- In office 1874–1878
- Succeeded by: Henry P. Scott

Personal details
- Party: Republican

William H. Jones was a state legislator in Mississippi. He represented Issaquena County in the Mississippi House of Representatives from 1874 to 1877. He was a Republican.

== See also ==
- African American officeholders from the end of the Civil War until before 1900
