= Little Willie Jones =

American singer (born 1936)

Willie Cornelius Jones (born 1936), known as Little Willie Jones, is an American soul singer and musician.

He recorded songs such as "You're Welcome to Try" and "The – When Will I Stop Lovin' You" with the Mellowettes on the VRC record label, described as "a Great sixties soul stomper from Newark, New Jersey with such a rough edge and a killer breakdown." He was ousted from Pat Teacake's Band and replaced by Otis Redding.
