= Wright House =

Wright House may refer to:

in the United States

(by state then town)

- Daniel R. Wright House, Eutaw, Alabama, listed on the National Register of Historic Places (NRHP) in Greene County
- David and Gladys Wright House in Phoenix, Arizona
- Canfield-Wright House, Del Mar, California, NRHP-listed in San Diego County
- Wright House (Newark, Delaware), NRHP-listed
- Hil'ardin/Sharp-Hardin-Wright House, Forsyth, Georgia, NRHP-listed in Monroe County
- Wright House (Thomasville, Georgia), NRHP-listed in Thomas County
- Wright House (Simpsonville, Kentucky), NRHP-listed in Shelby County
- Wright House (Somerville, Massachusetts), NRHP-listed
- Wright House (Greenwood, Mississippi), NRHP-listed in Leflore County
- Seely/Wright House, Oyster Bay, New York, a local historical landmark known also as Wright House
- Jones-Wright House, Rocky Ford, North Carolina, NRHP-listed
- Upham-Wright House, Newark, Ohio, NRHP-listed in Licking County
- Barnhart-Wright House, Portland, Oregon, NRHP-listed
- Aynesworth-Wright House, Austin, Texas, NRHP-listed
- Wright-Henderson-Duncan House, Granbury, Texas, NRHP-listed in Hood County
- Claughton-Wright House, Lewisetta, Virginia, NRHP-listed in Northumberland County
- Ely Wright House, Wausau, Wisconsin, NRHP-listed in Marathon County
- Mueller-Wright House, Wrightstown, Wisconsin, NRHP-listed in Brown County
