= USS Coeur de Lion =

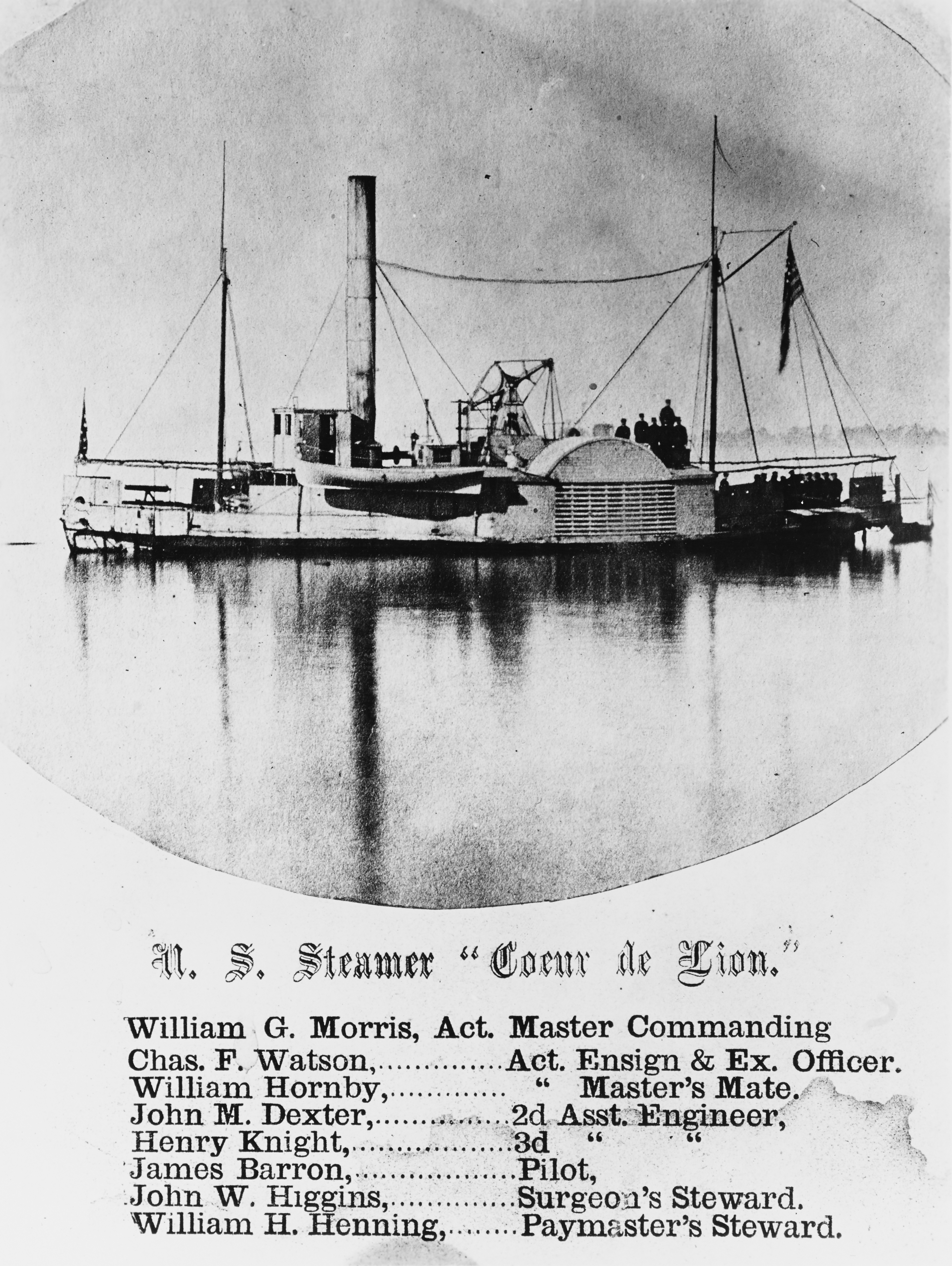

History

United States
- Name: Alfred Van Santvoort, 1853; Van Santvoort, 1857; Coeur de Lion, 1860; Alice, 1867
- Operator: Swiftsure Line, 1853; US Lighthouse Service, 1857; US Navy, 1860; US Lighthouse Service, 1865; unknown commercial, 1867
- Launched: 1853
- Fate: Burned ca. 1870

General characteristics as built in 1853
- Displacement: 110 tons
- Length: 100 ft (30 m)
- Beam: 20 ft 6 in (6.25 m)
- Draft: 4 ft 6 in (1.37 m)
- Depth of hold: 4 ft 10 in (1.47 m)

Alfred Van Santvoort was a wooden, side wheel steamship built in 1853. She likely towed barges on the Hudson River for the Swiftsure Line. In 1857 she was sold to the United States Lighthouse Service.

The Lighthouse Service assigned her at first to the Boston area and then New York. She maintained buoys, transported supplies to lighthouses, and assisted in the construction of new aids to navigation, notably the Minot's Ledge Lighthouse. She was the nation's first steam-powered lighthouse tender. Her name was changed to Coeur de Lion in 1860.

When the American Civil War broke out, the ship was loaned to the US Navy, which converted her into a gunboat and commissioned her as USS Coeur de Lion. She was primarily employed in interdicting Confederate shipping around Virginia.

The ship was returned to the Lighthouse Service after the war, but was found to be no longer useful. She was sold to a commercial operator in 1867, and renamed Alice. The shipped burned, likely in New Haven in 1870.

== Construction and characteristics ==
Alfred Van Santvoort's hull and upper works were built of wood. She was 100 feet (30 m) long, with a beam of 20.5 feet (6.2 m), and a light draft of 4.5 feet (1.4 m). She had a single coal-fired boiler that provided steam to a walking-beam steam engine. Its cylinder was 16 inches (0.41 m) in diameter and had a stroke of 6 feet (1.8 m). The engine powered two side-mounted paddlewheels. Her tonnage was 110.

The ship was launched in 1853 from a shipyard in Coxsackie, New York. She was first documented to begin coastal trade on 29 March 1854.

== Service history ==
=== Swiftsure Line (1853–1857) ===
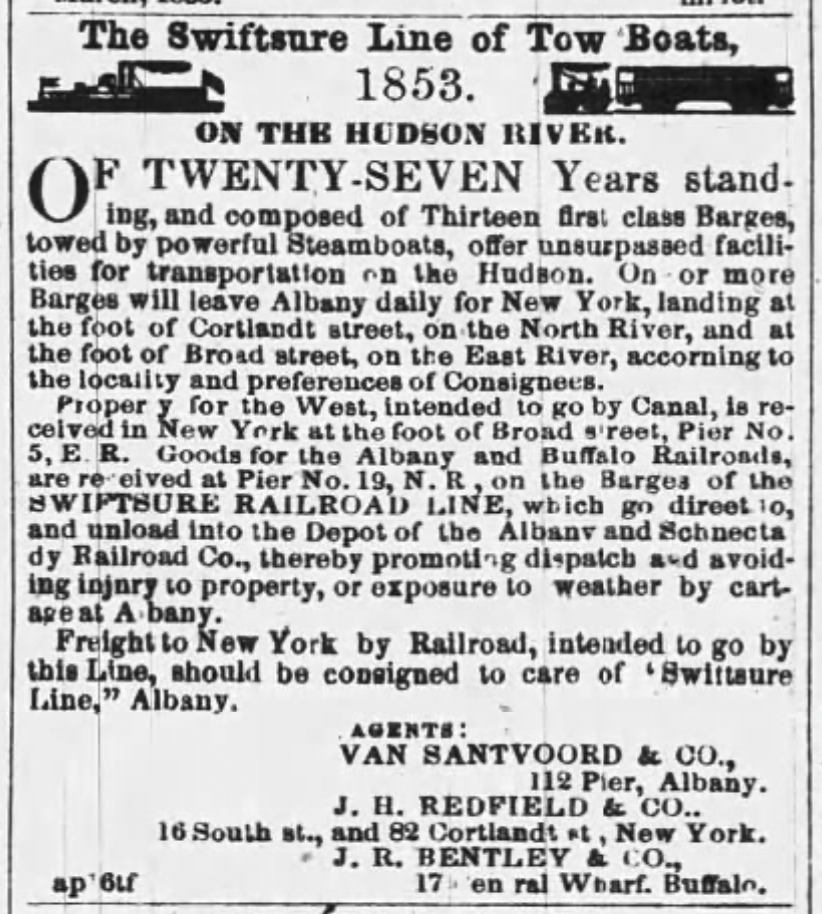
Ad for Van Santvoort's Swiftsure Line in 1853, the year Alfred Van Santvoort was launched

Abraham Van Santvoort was involved in steam navigation on the Hudson River from its earliest days. In the 1820's he became an agent for the Steam Navigation Company in New York. In 1845 he was an organizer and first president of the Hudson River Steamboat Company, known to the public as the "Swiftsure Line." This business towed barges with passengers and freight aboard between Albany and New York City.

Abraham likely commissioned Alfred Van Santvoord as a towboat for the Swiftsure Line's barges. The ship was named for his son, Alfred Van Santvoord.

=== U.S. Lighthouse Service (1857–1861) ===
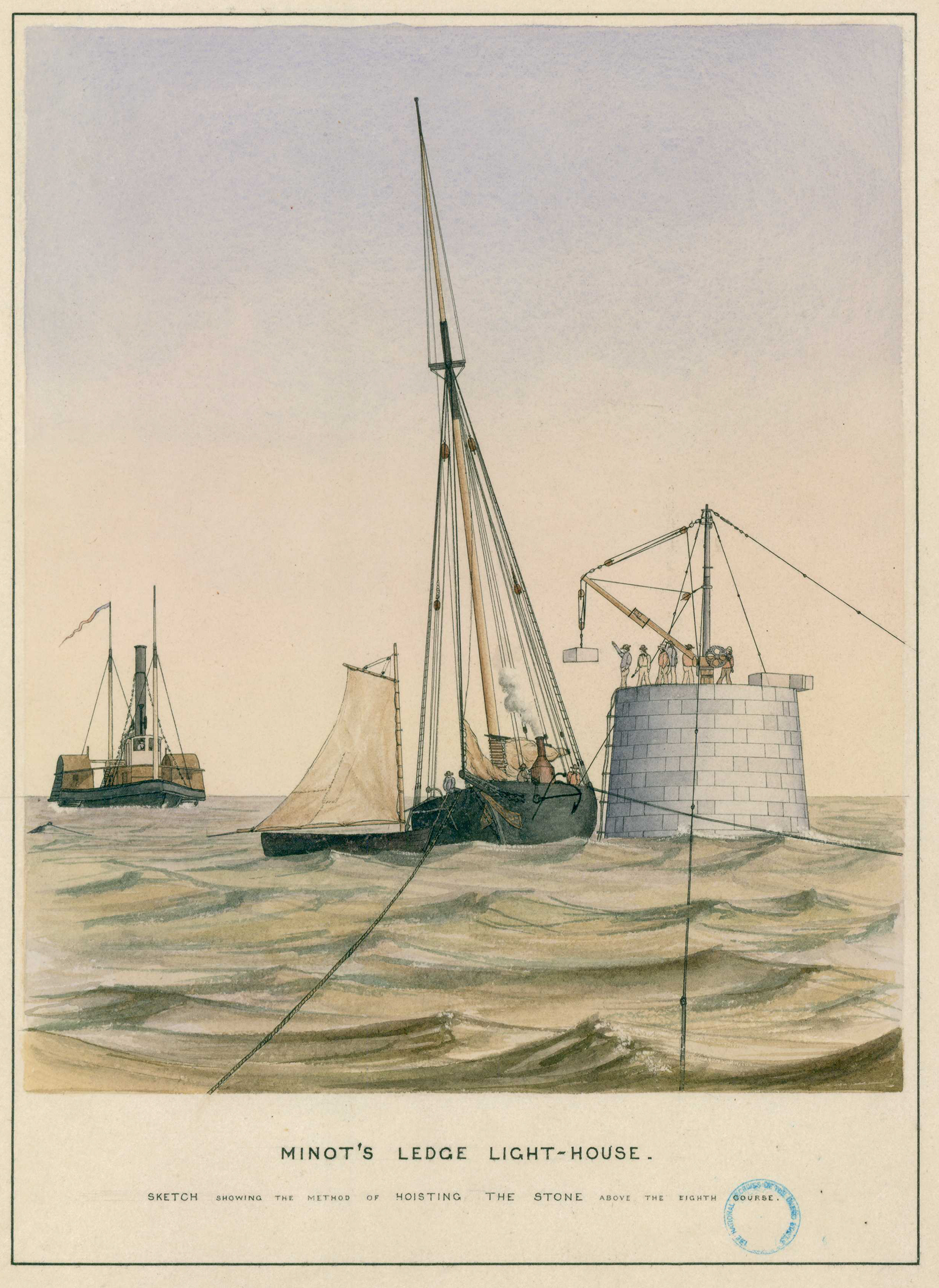
Construction of Minot's Ledge Light. Van Santvoort is on the left of the image. USLHT Minot is next to the lighthouse base.

The Lighthouse Service purchased Van Santvoort in 1857. She was the first steam-powered tender in the United States, which made her not only historic, but more useful than the sailing ships which were used as tenders since she could do her job regardless of the wind. Her shallow draft allowed her to safely work around the reefs and ledges where buoys and lighthouses were placed.

Van Santvoort was initially assigned to the 2nd Lighthouse District, which at the time included the Atlantic coast from Hampton Harbor, New Hampshire to Gooseberry Inlet, Massachusetts. Her most significant role during this assignment was to assist in the construction of the Minot's Ledge Lighthouse, which was at the time the most expensive lighthouse ever built by the United States.

In September 1860 the ship was transferred to the 3rd Lighthouse District which was centered on New York, and her name was changed to USLHT Couer de Lion. She was assigned to the Acting District Engineer, Commander Alexander M. Pennock.

=== U.S. Navy (1861–1865) ===
As the Civil War began, both combatants armed lighthouse tenders to quickly provide additional sea power. Coeur de Lion was loaned to the Navy Department by the Lighthouse Board in April 1861. She was sent to the New York Navy Yard, and outfitted as a gunboat. A 30-pounder Dahlgren rifle, a 12-pounder rifled gun, and a 12-pounder smooth-bore gun were installed. During her Navy career she had a crew of 29 men. She sailed to Washington, D.C. to begin her military career on 2 October 1861. She arrived, towing USS Granite, which had also been lent to the Navy by the Lighthouse Service, on 17 October 1861.

The ship's shallow draft enabled her to enforce the Union blockade of the Confederacy in the rivers and creeks along the Virginia and Maryland coasts, where she spent her entire Civil War service. She was assigned to a number of formations in this area during the war including the North Atlantic Blockading Squadron, the Potomac Flotilla, and the James River Flotilla.

Coer de Lion was effective in enforcing the blockade. She captured the schooner Emily Murray off Machodoc Creek, Virginia on 9 February 1863. Her crew burned the schooners Charity, Gazelle, and Flight in the Yeocomico River on 27 May 1862, and the Sarah Margaret and Odd Fellow on the Coan River on 11 June 1863. On 16 September 1863 the ship captured the blockade runner Robert Knowles. Coeur de Lion took possession of the schooner Melinda on 3 June 1864.

As Couer de Lion cruised the river banks in search of blockade runners, she frequently found herself in range of Confederate troops ashore. She exchanged fire with enemy infantry, artillery, and cavalry on dozens of occasions. For example, Coeur de Lion and a number of other gunboats were sent up the Appomattox River on 24 May 1862 on a reconnaissance, and fired on Confederate soldiers. On 4 December 1862, Coeur de Lion and a number of other gunboats shelled a Confederate position at Port Royal, Virginia. The ship fired her 30-pounder six times, her 12-pounder rifle seventeen times, and her twelve-pounder smooth bore five times. On 17 April 1863 the ship engaged a Confederate battery on the Nansemond River when she was struck four times. The first shot hit the wheelhouse killing her pilot and disabling her steering, and the second hit her bow, briefly setting the ship on fire. The last two shots injured the ship's boats.

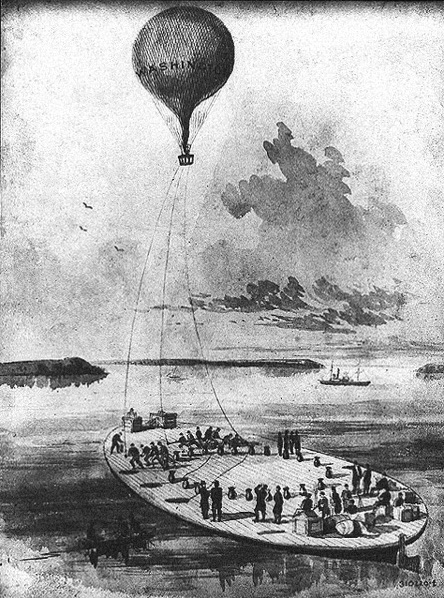
Coeur de Lion towed USS George Washington Parke Custis

The ship was also deployed defensively on occasion. She escorted convoys. On 28 August 1862, Coeur de Lion arrived at Aquia Creek, Virginia with the mission to protect a supply depot for General Ambrose Burnside's IX Corps of the Army of the Potomac. Secretary of the Navy Gideon Welles ordered Coeur de Lion to guard a bridge over the Gunpowder River on 2 July 1863.

On several occasions, Couer de Lion found civilians crossing rivers to escape harm from forces they opposed. The ship took the Confederates they found captive. Union sympathizers escaping from Virginia, on the other hand, were aided. For example, on 4 November 1862, the ship assisted Union-supporting families to sail to safety from Gwynn's Island, Virginia.

One of the ship's most unusual military duties began on 10 November 1861. Coeur de Lion towed the barge USS George Washington Parke Custis down the Potomac River from the Washington Navy Yard. The barge had been converted into the first seagoing ballon tender, arguably the first step towards naval aviation. On 11 November, the Union Army's Chief Aeronaut, Thaddeus S. C. Lowe, accompanied by General Daniel Sickles, ascended to observe Confederate forces near Mattawoman Creek. Coeur de Lion was engaged in balloon duty for at least a month, including a trip to Beaufort, South Carolina.

As the Civil War drew to a close, Couer de Lion was among the two dozen ships which were ordered from the Potomac Flotilla to the Washington Navy Yard for demobilization on 15 May 1865. Coeur de Lion was decommissioned by the Navy on 2 June 1865 and returned to the Lighthouse Board the following day.

=== U.S. Lighthouse Service (1865–1866) ===
Coeur de Lion was administratively attached the 4th Lighthouse District when she was returned to the Lighthouse Service. She was examined by Lighthouse District Inspector John S. Rudd, who considered her useless as a tender. She sailed from Washington to Philadelphia in late March 1866. On 8 November 1866, Coeur de Lion was sold at Wilmington, Delaware for $1,800.

=== Steamship Alice (1866–1870) ===
The ship was redocumented with the new name of Alice on 17 June 1867. The ship was assigned the signal letters H.B.T.P. and Official Number 792. Her new home port was Brooklyn, New York.

She passed out of Federal documentation in 1872, with the notation that she had burned. It is likely that the she was the small steamer named Alice which spent the summer of 1870 carrying excursionists from New Haven, Connecticut to Lighthouse Point. On 17 August 1870, after landing her sixty passengers at the park, Alice burned to the waterline. Her owner was Lorenzo Burhaus of Brooklyn. In December 1870, he commissioned a salvage effort which recovered the ship's walking beam and little else.
