= Pioneer Farms =

Living history museum in Austin, Texas

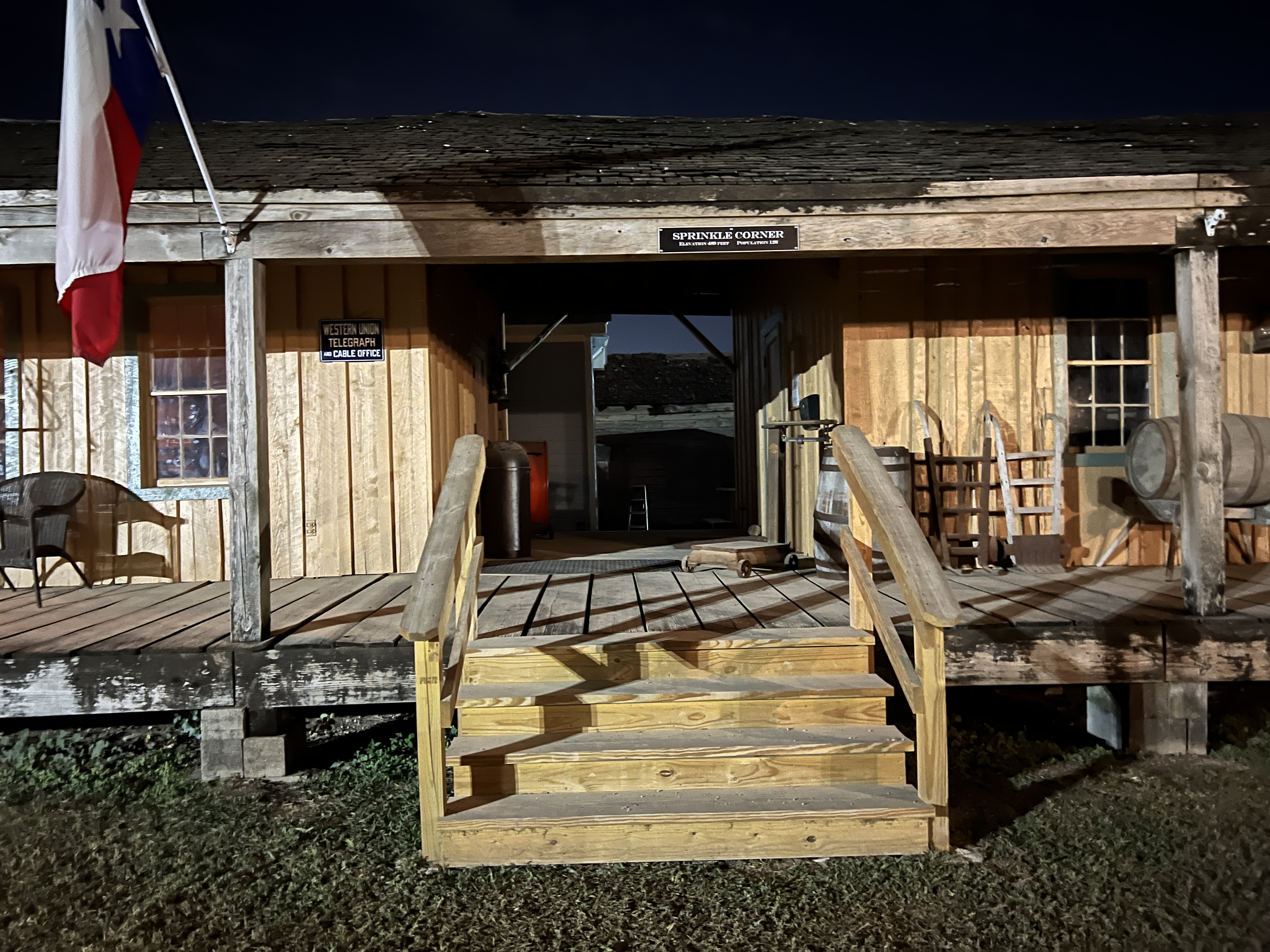
- Sprinkle Corner, a village in the museum

- Location within Texas Pioneer Farms (the United States)
- Established: 1975
- Location: 10621 Pioneer Farms Drive; Austin, Texas
- Coordinates: 30.3684592°N 97.6590796°W
- Type: Living history museum
- Website: Pioneer Farms

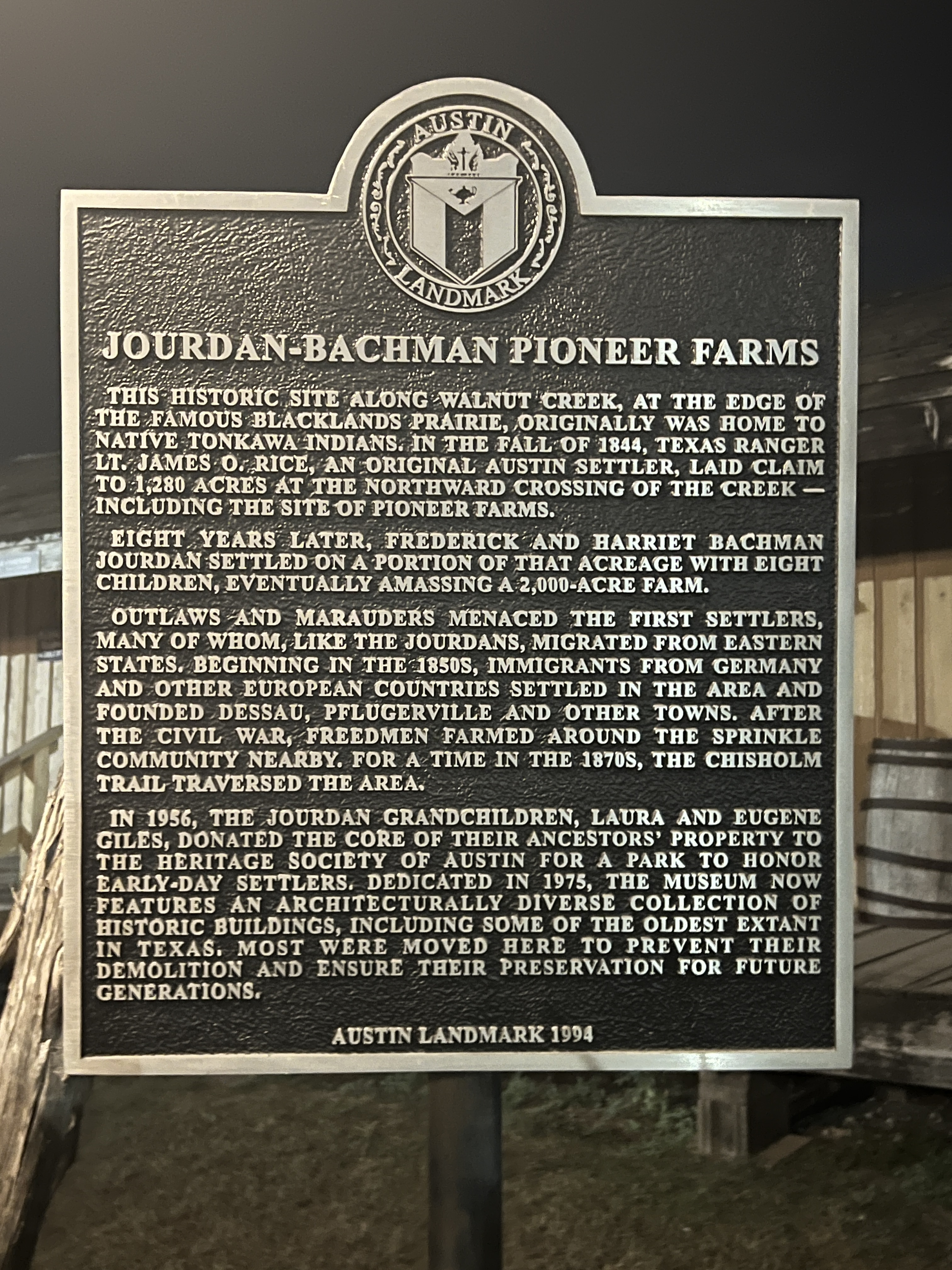
Historical marker for the museum

Pioneer Farms (formerly known as the Jourdan-Bachman Pioneer Farm or pluralized, the Jourdan-Bachman Pioneer Farms) is a living history museum in Austin, Texas. The site was originally granted to a settler, James O. Rice, in the fall of 1844 as part of a larger land acquisition. Frederick and Harriet Jourdan moved into what is now known as Pioneer Farms in 1852 and would later build a farm about 2,000 acres large. Pioneer Farms itself is only about 95 acres in size. In 1956, the site was donated to the Heritage Society of Austin by the grandchildren of Frederick and Harriet for the purpose of establishing a park there. It formally became a history museum in 1975. The museum is open to the public from Tuesday to Friday and hosts themed events for holidays like Halloween, Easter and Christmas. The museum hosts field trips and educational programs for schoolchildren.

Pioneer Farms contains numerous historic locations within its boundaries, along with the Scarborough Barn, a livestock farm. Various animals such as chickens, horses and Texas longhorns can be found in the barn. Some of the structures that are at the farm were originally in separate locations in Central Texas and were moved there to preserve their history. Other in Pioneer Farms include a farm that was inhabited by German immigrant Fritz Kruger in 1868, during a period of economic growth for Texas' agricultural industry. Another location within the museum is a green belt that was designated in 1853. Many other areas are in the museum; a blacksmithery, the James Bell home and the Frederick Jourdan cabin, a stone blockhouse built in 1868, a rural village established in 1899, a stagecoach stop constructed in 1873, an 1864 encampment of the Tonkawa people, and several other farms built throughout the 19th century. Pioneer Farms is home to the historic Aynesworth–Wright House.
