= Coan River =

Coordinates: 37.988771°N 76.465795°W

Location
- Country: United States
- Location: Northumberland County, Virginia

Physical characteristics
- Mouth
  - location: Potomac River
  - elevation: 0 feet (0 m)
- Length: 7.5 mi (12.1 km)

The Coan River is a 7.5-mile-long (12.1 km) river in Virginia's Northern Neck region. It is a tributary of the Potomac River. It flows from its source in Heathsville through Northumberland County and into the Potomac between Lewisetta and Walnut Point.

== See also ==
- List of rivers of Virginia
