= Aynesworth–Wright House =

Historic house in Texas, United States

- U.S. National Register of Historic Places
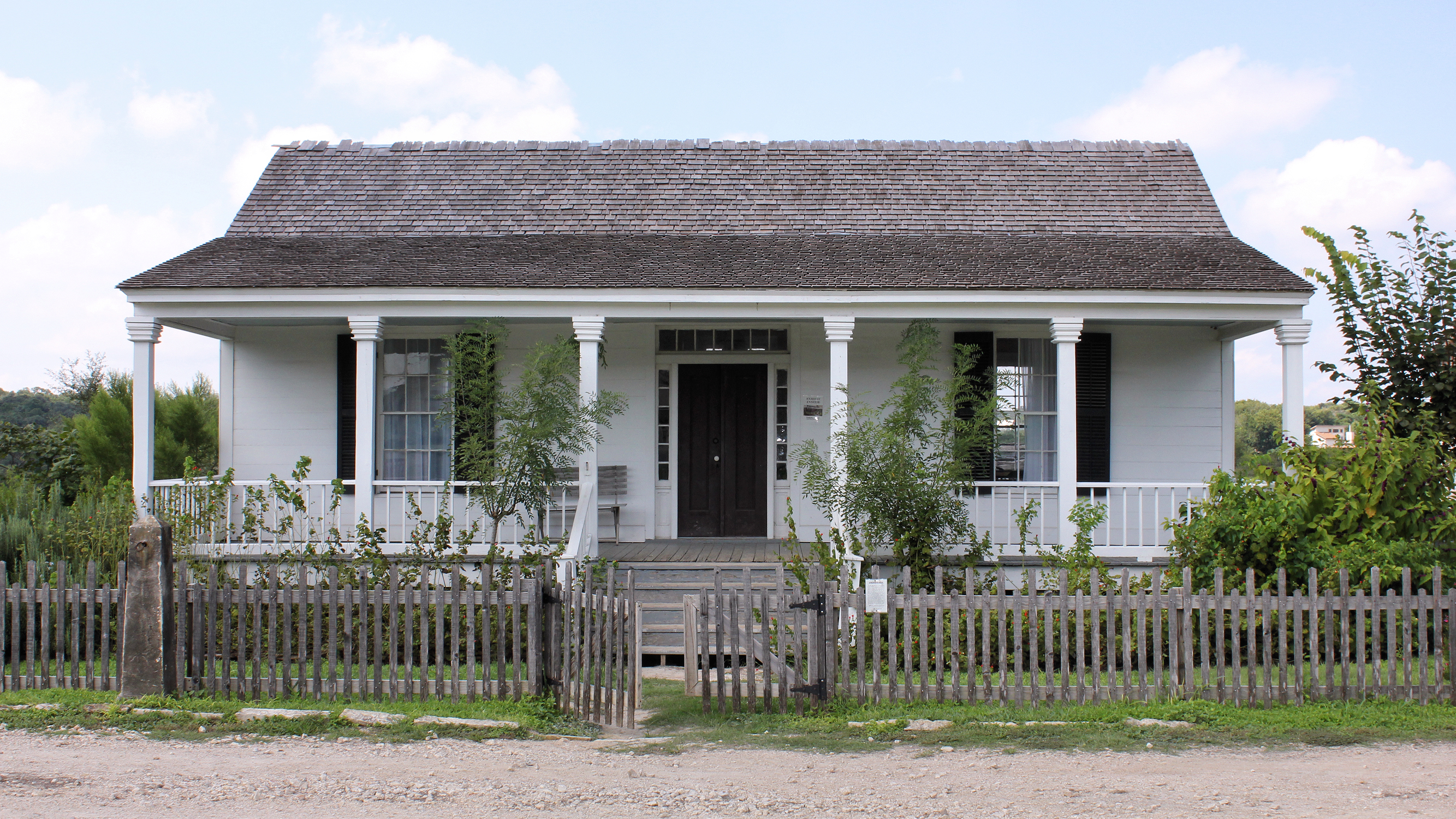

- Location within Texas Location within the United States
- Nearest city: Austin, Texas
- Coordinates: 30°22′5.7396″N 97°39′31.9314″W
- Area: less than one acre
- Built: 1852
- Architect: Isaiah H. Aynesworth
- Architectural style: Greek Revival
- NRHP reference No.: 80004156
- Added to NRHP: September 27, 1980

The Aynesworth–Wright House is a historic Austin, Texas, house, built in 1852 and listed on the National Register of Historic Places. It is now located at Pioneer Farms, 10621 Pioneer Farms Drive.

== Description and history ==
The Texas Historical Commission plaque reads: Isaiah Hezekiah Aynesworth (b. 1797) a Baptist preacher and cabinet maker, constructed this Greek revival residence about 1852. Originally located at 4507 East Avenue, it was a two-room house with an enclosed dog-run hallway. Additional rooms were later attached to the back porch. Dr. Joseph Wright (1798-1898) purchased the property from Aynesworth in 1855. A physician and surveyor, Wright practiced medicine in a log building near his home. The house was moved to this location and restored by Franklin Savings Association.
