= Barnhart–Wright House =

Historic building in Portland, Oregon, U.S.

- U.S. National Register of Historic Places
- U.S. Historic district – Contributing property
- Portland Historic Landmark
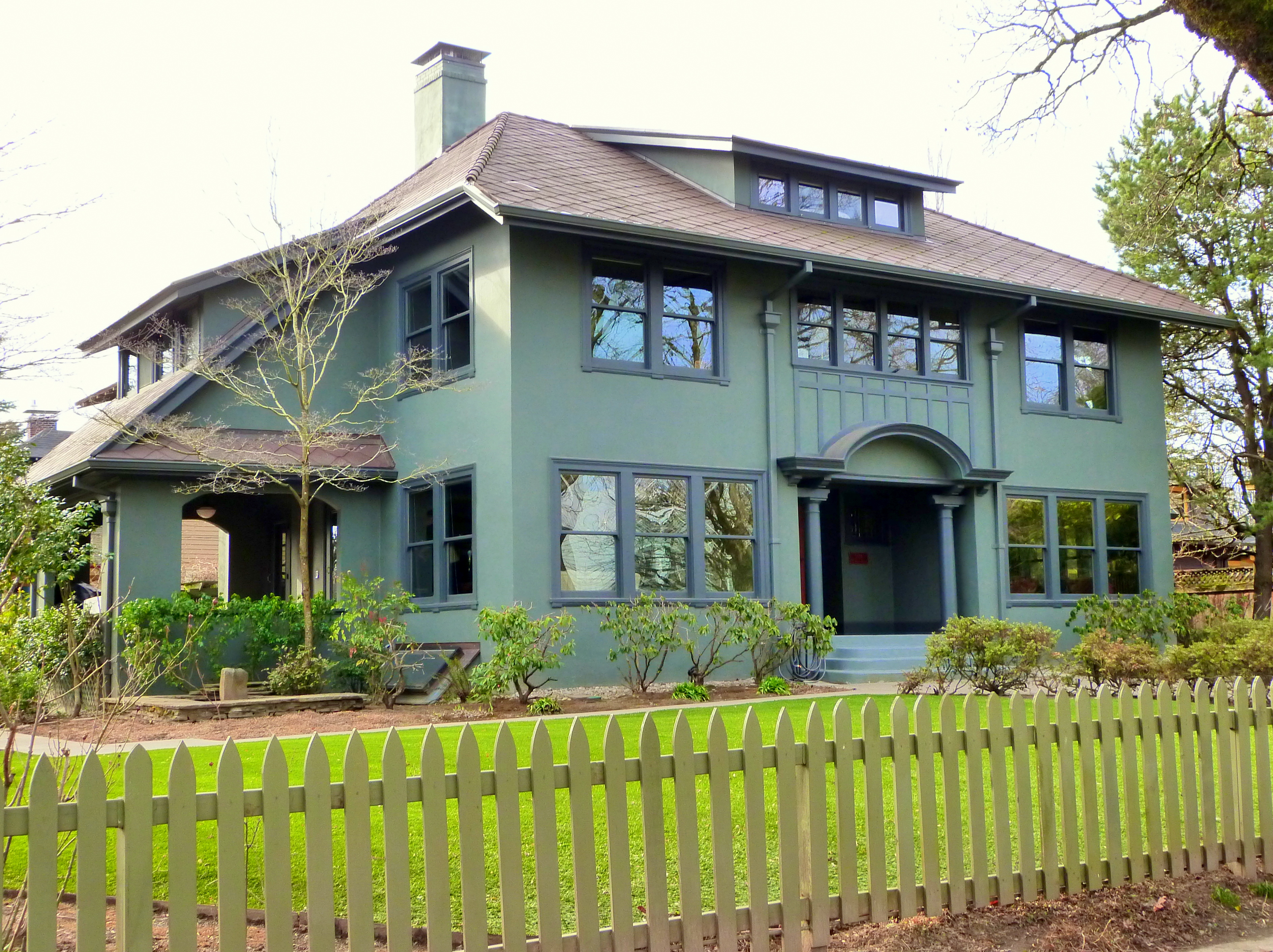
- The Barnhart–Wright House in 2017
- Location: 1828 NE Knott Street; Portland, Oregon
- Coordinates: 45°32′31″N 122°38′48″W
- Area: 0.22 acres (0.089 ha)
- Built: 1914
- Built by: Frederic E. Bowman
- Architectural style: Arts and Crafts, with Prairie School influences
- Part of: Irvington Historic District (ID10000850)
- NRHP reference No.: 97000582

Significant dates
- Added to NRHP: June 13, 1997
- Designated CP: October 22, 2010

The Barnhart–Wright House is a historic house located in the Irvington neighborhood of Portland, Oregon, United States. It was built in 1913–1914 by general contractor Frederic E. Bowman, whose constructions shaped several neighborhoods in the city. It stands as one of the best-preserved and most expensive single-family homes in his body of work, and is an outstanding example of the use of Arts and Crafts architecture with Prairie School influences in an upper-class Portland home.

The house was listed on the National Register of Historic Places in 1997.

== See also ==
- National Register of Historic Places listings in Northeast Portland, Oregon
