= Lewisetta, Virginia =

Unincorporated community in Virginia, United States

Lewisetta
- Unincorporated village
- Location within the state of Virginia Lewisetta (the United States)
- Coordinates: 37°59′52″N 76°27′46″W
- Country: United States
- State: Virginia
- County: Northumberland
- Time zone: UTC−5 (Eastern (EST))
  - Summer (DST): UTC−4 (EDT)

Lewisetta is an unincorporated village on Travis Point in Northumberland County, Virginia, United States. Lewisetta is located on the tidal Potomac River. It is also at the point where the 38th parallel meets the mainland of Virginia.

The community's was named after Etta Lewis, the daughter of the community's first postmaster. The post office, which opened in 1888, was still in operation as of 1983. In the first half of the 20th century, the community's economy was based on facilities which processed oysters, herring, and tomatoes, but those were closed in the 1950s due to economic pressures. Until the 1930s and 1940s, Lewisetta's primary economic ties were with Baltimore, Maryland, before switching to Richmond, Virginia, when road transport supplanted steamboat traffic. Circa 1960, a number of summer cottages were built along the waterfront at Lewisetta; a 1983 article in the Richmond Times-Dispatch noted that the population at Lewisetta was roughly 300 on certain summer weekends and half that in the winter.

== Historic sites ==
- Claughton-Wright House, listed on the National Register of Historic Places
