= Claughton–Wright House =

Historic house in Virginia, United States

- U.S. National Register of Historic Places
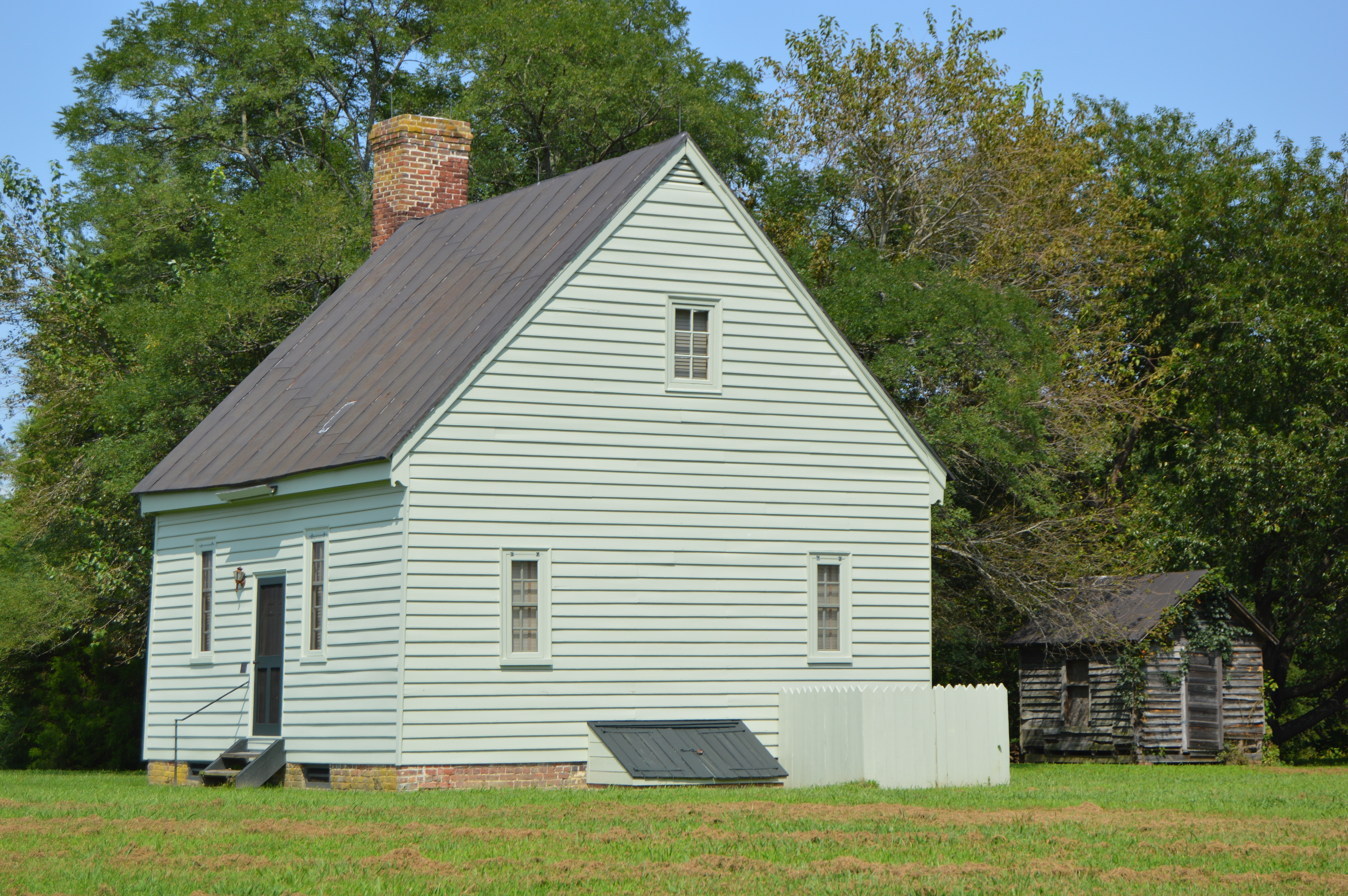
- Front and southern side

- Location within Virginia Location within the United States
- Nearest city: Lewisetta, Virginia
- Coordinates: 37°59′41″N 76°30′47″W
- Area: 4.8 acres (1.9 ha)
- Built: 1787
- Built by: William Claughton
- Architectural style: Federal
- NRHP reference No.: 97000491
- Added to NRHP: May 23, 1997

The Claughton–Wright House is a historic house in rural Northumberland County, Virginia. It is located near Lewisetta, 2 mi. northeast of the junction of VA 623 and VA 624, on Wright's Cove, a tributary of Glebe Creek. The small wood-frame house was built in 1787 by William Claughton, a major landowner in the area. The house is a rare example of a period house in tidewater Virginia. The building was restored in 2009.

The house was listed on the National Register of Historic Places in 1997.

== See also ==
- National Register of Historic Places listings in Northumberland County, Virginia
