= USS George Washington Parke Custis =

US Navy barge used for balloon launches

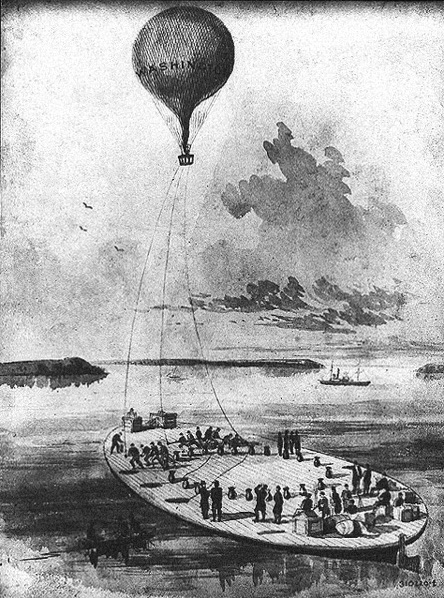
- The Union Army balloon Washington tethered to the barge George Washington Parke Custis

History

United States
- Name: USS George Washington Parke Custis
- Namesake: George Washington Parke Custis
- Laid down: date unknown
- Launched: mid-1850s
- Acquired: August 1861
- In service: 1861
- Out of service: 1865
- Stricken: not known
- Fate: not known

General characteristics
- Type: Barge
- Displacement: not known
- Length: 120 ft (37 m) (net)
- Beam: 14 ft 6 in (4.42 m)
- Depth of hold: 5 ft 6 in (1.68 m)
- Propulsion: none
- Speed: not known
- Complement: not known
- Armament: not known

USS George Washington Parke Custis was a barge acquired by the Union Navy during the American Civil War for use as a balloon-launching platform to spy on Confederate defenses from afar.

This initial balloon experiment by John A. Dahlgren led to intensified balloon spying during the remainder of the war.

== Conversion to balloon barge by John A. Dahlgren ==
George Washington Parke Custis, a coal barge built in the mid-1850s, was purchased by the Union Navy in August 1861; fitted out with a gas-generating apparatus developed by Thaddeus Sobieski Constantine Lowe; and modified by Dahlgren at the Washington Navy Yard for her service as a balloon barge.

=== Balloon launched to view Confederate forces in Virginia ===
Early in the morning of 10 November 1861, steamer Coeur de Lion towed George Washington Parke Custis out of the Navy Yard and down the Potomac River. The next day Lowe, accompanied by General Daniel E. Sickles and others, ascended in his trial balloon from the barge off Mattawomen Creek to observe Confederate forces on the Virginia shore some three miles away.

On the 12th Lowe reported:

We had a fine view of the enemy camp fires during the evening and saw the rebels constructing batteries at Freestone Point.

=== Balloon launches cause technological leap in reconnaissance ===
This operation and John La Mountain's earlier ascension from Fanny began the widespread use of balloons for reconnaissance work during the Civil War and foreshadowed the Navy's future use of the air to extend its effective use of sea power.

== See also ==
- Thaddeus S. C. Lowe
- Union Army Balloon Corps
- Balloon (aircraft)
- Observation balloon
