= Nellie Crockett =

- U.S. National Register of Historic Places
- U.S. National Historic Landmark
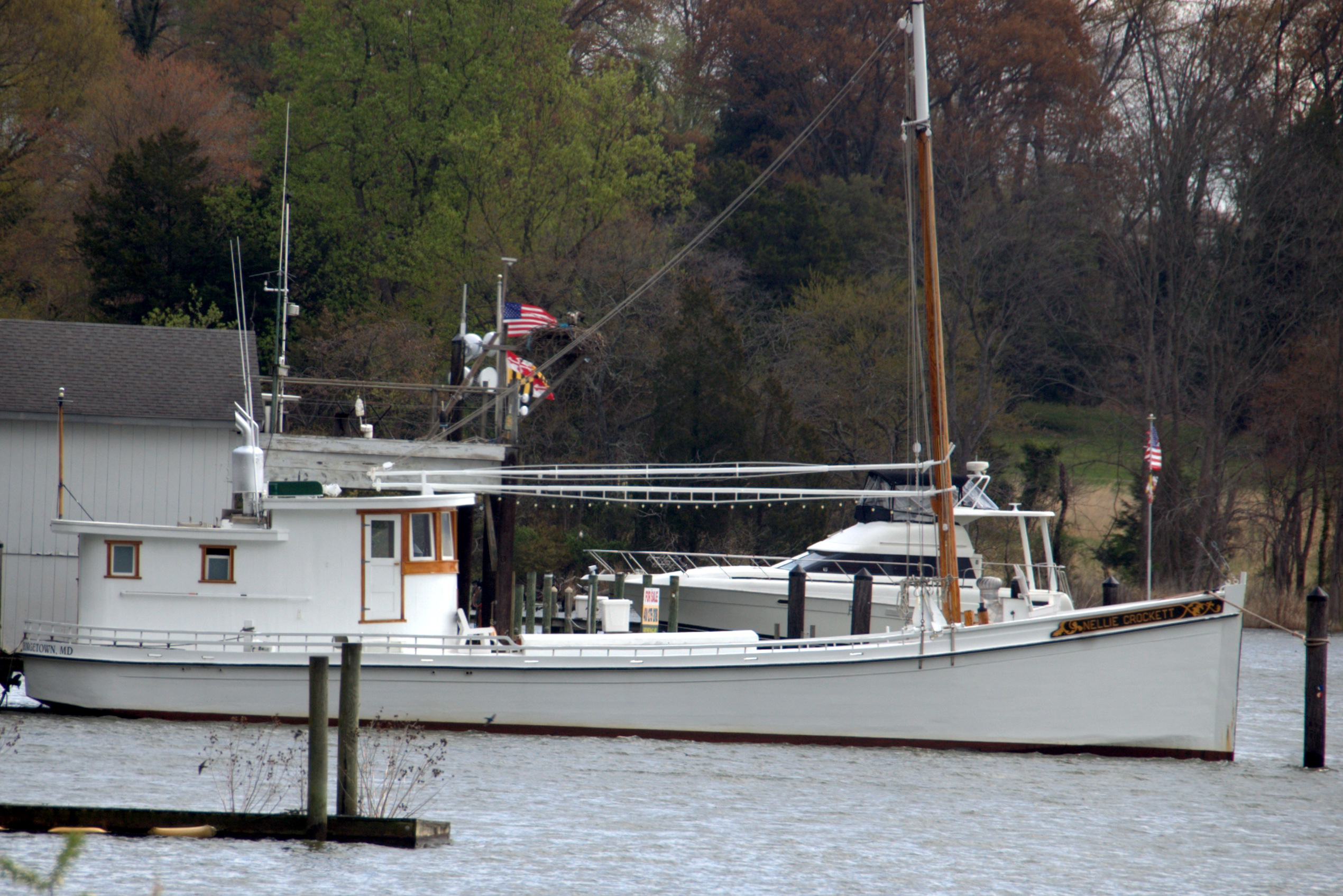

- Location within Maryland Location within the United States
- Location: Georgetown, Maryland
- Coordinates: 39°21′47″N 75°52′55″W
- Built: 1926
- Architect: Dana, Charles A.
- NRHP reference No.: 94001185

Significant dates
- Added to NRHP: April 19, 1994
- Designated NHL: April 19, 1994

The Nellie Crockett is a Chesapeake Bay oyster buy-boat built for Andrew A. Crockett of Tangier, Virginia, in 1925. She is located at Georgetown, Maryland, USA. She was designated a National Historic Landmark in 1994.

The Nellie Crockett was built specifically to operate as a buy-boat, making the rounds of the Chesapeake Bay oyster beds to buy oysters directly from the harvesters, typically sail-powered skipjacks or oyster tongers. This allowed the oyster dredges to remain on the beds, avoiding the need to return to port when full. Buy-boats typically gave a lower price than a dockside sale, but most oystermen considered this a fair trade for not losing time on a run back to the dock. She is considered one of the best-preserved examples of this type of vessel.

== Description ==
The Nellie Crockett is a wooden, traditional Chesapeake bay cross-planked construction, documented measuring 61.6 ft long, 20.33 ft on the beam and 6.42 ft in draft (18.8 m × 6.20 m × 1.96 m). She measures 52 tons gross and 35 tons net. Her wide beam and moderate draft were useful in her business of buying, loading and transporting oysters in the shallow waters of the Chesapeake Bay. The hull is built using wood frames made from the natural crooks of tree limbs and roots. It is planked with 3.5-inch (8.9 cm) pine. The deck planking is sprung fore-and-aft over deck beams on hanging knees. A partially watertight bulkhead is located in the forecastle.

Power is presently provided by a Detroit Diesel 871, dating to 1971 or 1972, fueled from two 150-US-gallon (570 L; 120 imp gal) boilerplate steel tanks. A 90-US-gallon (340 L) water tank is also fitted.

The center of the deck is dominated by a large hold opening, 25 by 13.5 feet (7.6 by 4.1 m), surrounded by a coaming. The 12-inch (30 cm) mast lies just ahead of the hatch, rising 41 feet (12 m). A 1956 quarter and a 1951 nickel were found under the mast, indicating that it was replaced or re-stepped in the 1950s, with a traditional coin placed underneath at the time. The mast has two cargo-handling booms attached at its base. The foc'sle hatch is forward of the mainmast, measuring 4.6 ft long and 3.2 ft wide (1.4 m × 0.98 m). A low railing runs from the foc'sle hatch to the stern, with two rails, one above the other.

The pilot house is rectangular with a rounded front, 20.42 ft long and 8.42 ft wide (6.22 m × 2.57 m). It is covered with vertical tongue-and-groove sheathing. The pilot house is divided into three compartments, each formerly divided from the others by doors, now missing. The wheel room occupies the front compartment, housing the rope-and-pulley-operated wheel, with five windows on the front, two on either side, and doors on either side. A heater stands at the rear. A flush deck hatch gives access to the engine compartment. The next compartment behind the wheel room, and a little lower, is the bunk room, 6.5 feet (2.0 m) long, with three bunks on the port side and a shower on the starboard side, replacing the original head. There is a porthole for the upper bunk. Behind the bunkroom lies the kitchen, 4 feet (1.2 m) long, with a window on each side and a door aft. At the fore, in the foc'sle compartment, two more bunks are provided.

The Crockett is substantially the same as she was built. Apart from the installation of a radar unit two deck manholes were added, a bulkhead was removed in the engine room, and a stove may have been removed from the foc'sle. The hold was not used during the Ward family's tenure, as it was considered too smelly. Oysters were stored on deck in baskets, as many as 2200 bushels at a time, with ten to twelve tons of granite ballast below.

== History ==
The Nellie Crockett was built in 1925 by Charles A. Dana at Crisfield, Maryland for Andrew A. "Shad" Crockett of Tangier, Virginia. She was named for one of Crockett's daughters. Until 1942 she was operated by Crockett, carrying oysters in season and produce and lumber in the off season. In 1942 she was purchased by the U.S. War Shipping Administration for $6,000 as a fireboat in ports along the Chesapeake. Designated CG-65015F, she served until 1945, when Crockett bought her back for $10. Crockett sold a half share in Crockett to William Smith and a quarter share to Charles M. Crockett for a total of $750 in 1946. Her original 45 hp engine was replaced with a 60 hp engine. On Christmas Eve 1947, Priscilla Crocket was given Andrew Crockett's share for one dollar. She was sold in 1950 to Gus Forbush, who changed the engine to a 165 hp model. She was then sold to Gilbert Ashley, who moved her to Baltimore, but then sold her in 1952 to J. Harry Porter and Harry B. Porter of Baltimore, who moved her back to Crisfield. In 1957, the Porters sold her to James H. Ward Sr. and William H. Ward of Reedville, Virginia. William sold his share to James in 1966. James Ward operated Crockett as a buy-boat until his death in 1986. Family members continued to operate her until 1990. She was then bought by Theodore L. Parish of Georgetown. She was still in Parish's hands and visiting Chesapeake Bay and North Carolina ports, such as Oriental, and buy-boat reunions as recently as 2016.

== See also ==
- William B. Tennison, a former bugeye converted to a buy-boat, now also a National Historic Landmark
- List of National Historic Landmarks in Maryland
- National Register of Historic Places listings in Kent County, Maryland
