= Dodlyt, Virginia =

Unincorporated community in Virginia, US

Coordinates: 37°53′49″N 76°30′37″W

Dodlyt is an unincorporated community in Northumberland County, in the U.S. state of Virginia.
