= Bundick, Virginia =

Unincorporated community in Virginia, US

Coordinates: 37°57′38″N 76°29′14″W

Bundick is an unincorporated community in Northumberland County, in the U.S. state of Virginia.
