= Kayan, Virginia =

Unincorporated community in Virginia, US

Coordinates: 37°53′27″N 76°16′12″W

Kayan is an unincorporated community in Northumberland County, in the U.S. state of Virginia.
