= Sunnybank, Virginia =

Unincorporated community in Virginia, US

Coordinates: 37°53′10″N 76°16′02″W

Sunnybank is an unincorporated community in Northumberland County, in the U.S. state of Virginia.
