= Edwardsville, Virginia =

Unincorporated community in Virginia, US

Coordinates: 37.90652°N 76.36523°W

Edwardsville is an unincorporated community in Northumberland County, in the U.S. state of Virginia.
