= Chesapeake Beach, Northumberland County, Virginia =

Unincorporated community in Northumberland County, Virginia, United States

Coordinates: 37°50′27″N 76°15′01″W

Chesapeake Beach is an unincorporated community in Northumberland County, in the U.S. state of Virginia.
