= Gonyon, Virginia =

Unincorporated community in Virginia, US

Coordinates: 37°54′13″N 76°20′19″W

Gonyon is an unincorporated community in Northumberland County, in the U.S. state of Virginia.
