= Lynhams, Virginia =

Unincorporated community in Virginia, United States

- Location within Virginia
- Coordinates: 37°43′06″N 76°20′34″W
- Country: United States
- State: Virginia
- County: Northumberland County
- Elevation: 13 ft (4.0 m)
- Time zone: UTC−5 (EST)
  - Summer (DST): UTC−4 (EDT)
- FIPS code: 51-47730
- GNIS feature ID: 1477508

Lynhams is an unincorporated community in Northumberland County, in the U.S. state of Virginia.
