= Reedville Historic District =

Historic district in Virginia, United States

- U.S. National Register of Historic Places
- U.S. Historic district
- Virginia Landmarks Register
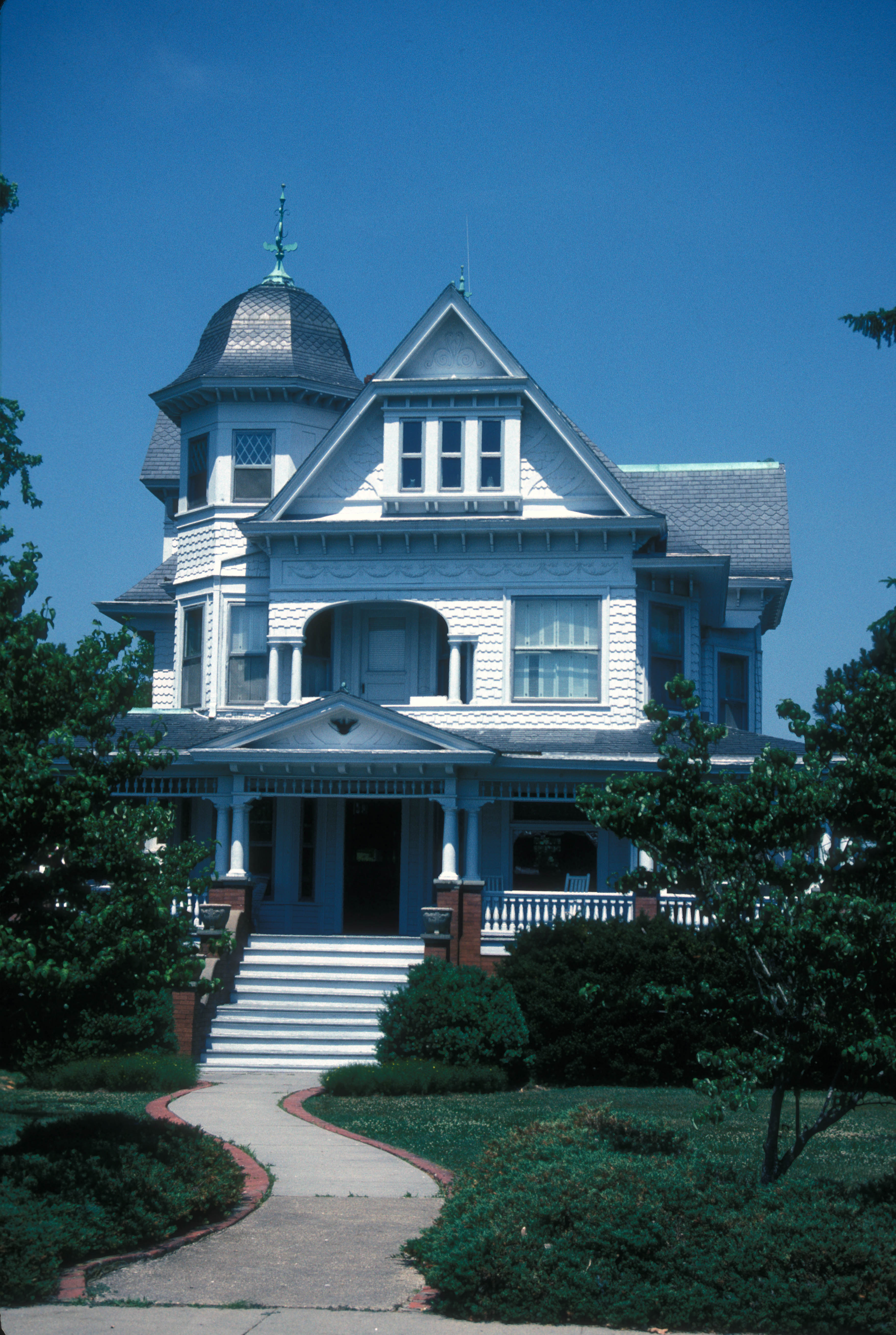
- House in the Reedville Historic District, March 1971

- Location within Virginia Location within the United States
- Location: VA 644 at VA 722, Reedville, Virginia
- Coordinates: 37°50′31″N 76°16′37″W
- Area: 49 acres (20 ha)
- Architectural style: Late 19th And 20th Century Revivals, Queen Anne
- NRHP reference No.: 84003556
- VLR No.: 066-0083

Significant dates
- Added to NRHP: August 16, 1984
- Designated VLR: June 19, 1984

Reedville Historic District is a national historic district located at Reedville, Northumberland County, Virginia. The district includes 64 contributing buildings in the village of Reedville. It is an assemblage of primarily residential buildings dating to the late-19th and early-20th century during the village's predominance in the menhaden fishing industry. Notable buildings include the Reedville Masonic Hall, Bethany Methodist Church (1899), five modified Queen Anne style houses known as "Millionaires Row," Reedville Market (the former Blundon and Hinton Department Store), Reed and Rice Store (1913), and the former People's Bank of Reedville (1910).

It was listed on the National Register of Historic Places in 1984.
