= Tibitha, Virginia =

Unincorporated community in Virginia, US

Coordinates: 37°50′18″N 76°15′44″W

Tibitha is an unincorporated community in Northumberland County, in the U.S. state of Virginia.
