= Browns Store =

Browns Store may refer to:

- Browns Store, Ohio
- Browns Store, Virginia

== See also ==
- Brown-Graves House and Brown's Store
- Brown's Department Store
