= Reedville, Virginia =

Unincorporated community in Virginia, United States

Reedville
- Unincorporated community
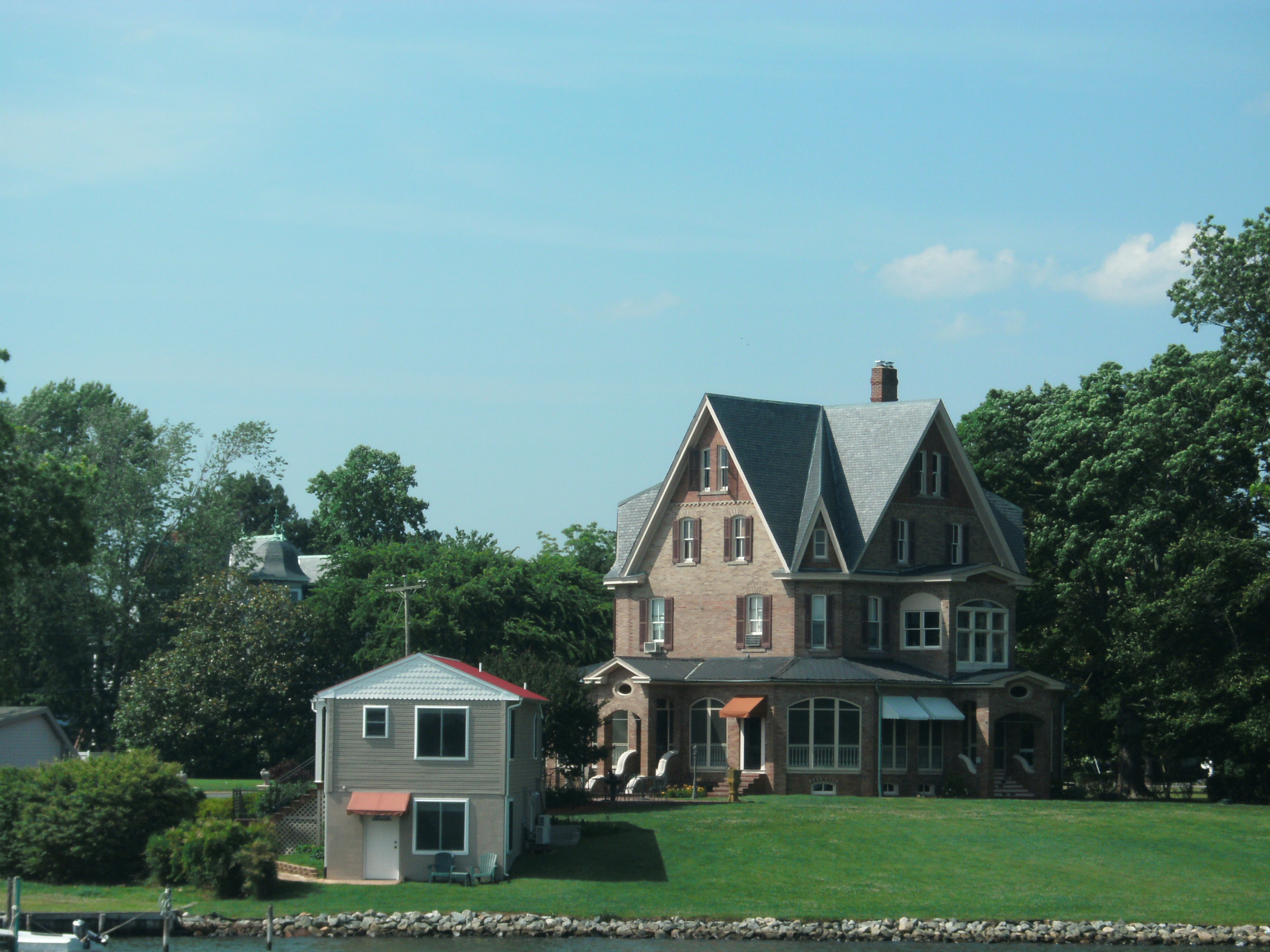
- A house in Reedville, June 2010

- Location within the Commonwealth of Virginia Reedville (the United States)
- Coordinates: 37°50′31″N 76°16′33″W
- Country: United States
- State: Virginia
- County: Northumberland
- Time zone: UTC−5 (Eastern (EST))
  - Summer (DST): UTC−4 (EDT)

Reedville is an unincorporated community in Northumberland County in the Northern Neck region of the U.S. state of Virginia. It is located at the eastern terminus of U.S. Route 360 (Northumberland Highway) east of Heathsville, at the head of Cockrell's Creek on the western shore of the Chesapeake Bay.

Reedville is home to the fishing industry for Atlantic menhaden, a small oily fish found in great abundance in mid-Atlantic coastal waters. The Omega Protein corporation runs many of its vessels and lands much of its catch in Reedville. The town is also a popular place to begin fishing charters and trips to Tangier Island in the Bay. Reedville is a destination itself, steeped in the history of the menhaden fishing industry. Its Millionaire's Row of Victorian-era mansions in the Reedville Historic District and two of the Fishermen's Museum's watercraft are listed on the National Register of Historic Places.

== History ==
Reedville was named for Captain Elijah W. Reed (1827-1888). In 1874, Reed, a sea captain from Maine, came south to the Chesapeake Bay and recognized the potential of the menhaden fishing industry. As early as the 1620s, in the area which became New England, the Native Americans had taught the Plymouth Colony's settlers the value of burying menhaden in each hill of corn, as fertilizer.

Captain Reed moved his business from Brooklin, Maine, to the Northern Neck, and brought to the established community of watermen a method of extracting large quantities of oil from the fish, by rendering them by the millions. Their oil was used as a lubricant and in lighting, as whale oil was; and the leftover bones and carcasses were valuable as fertilizer. He opened the first processing plant. By 1885, Reedville was heavily engaged in the menhaden fishing industry. Menhaden processing factories on Cockrell Creek produced fish oil, meal, and fertilizer from menhaden. The menhaden fishing industry brought tremendous wealth to Reedville and to Northumberland County. Reedville, a town of approximately 500, was once known as the wealthiest town in the United States, due to its large income produced by the menhaden industry.

Fishing boat captains and factory owners, who made their fortunes from menhaden, built homes along what is now Main Street.

Dozens of fish processing factories, most recently Omega Protein Corporation (successor to Zapata Haynie, Reedville Oil and Guano Company, and Haynie Products Company) and Standard Products Company, have dotted the Northumberland County coastline near Reedville and other fishing communities.

== Modern times: fishing, tourism ==
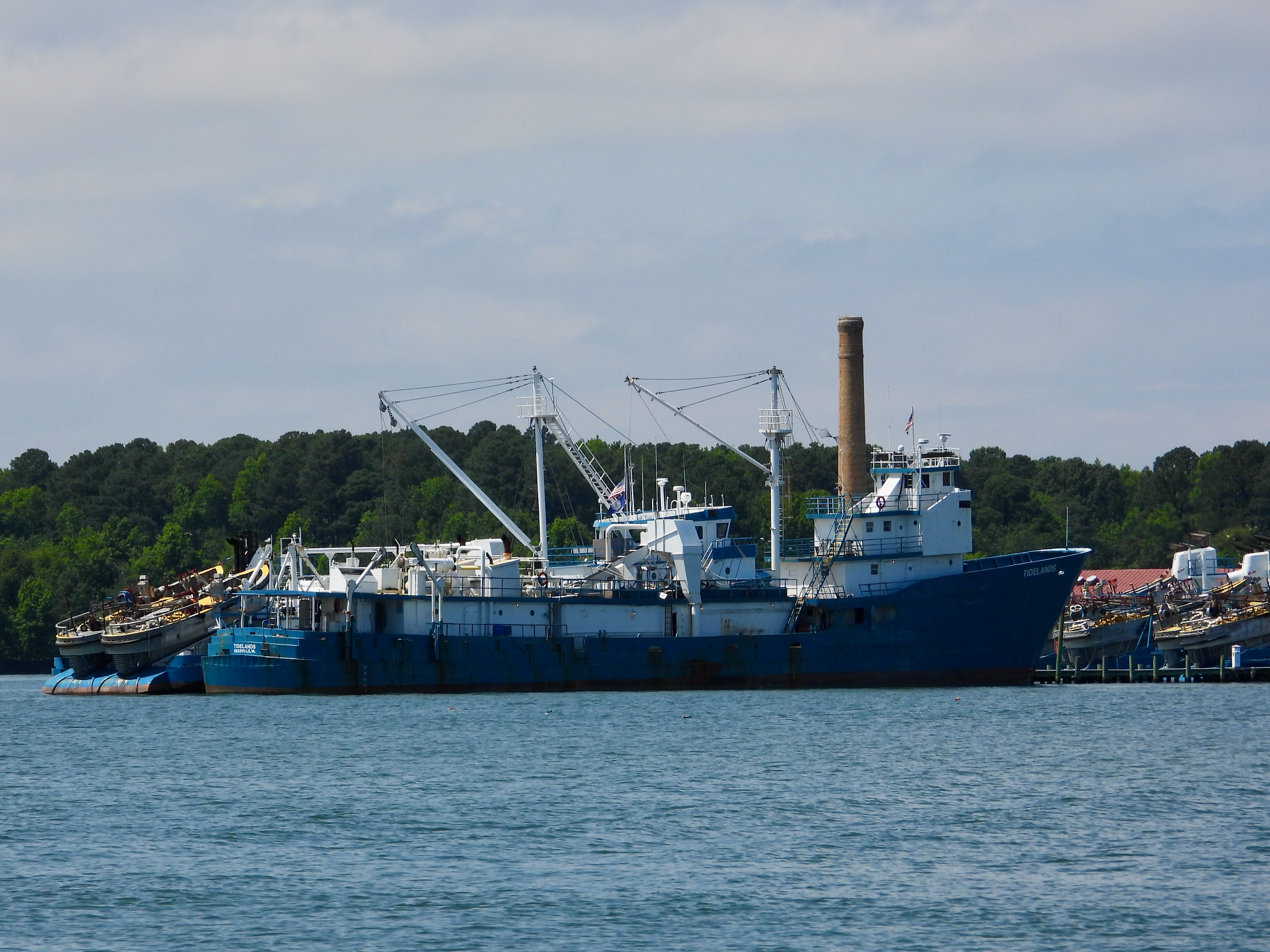
Several fishing boats docked at the Omega Protein plant

Omega Protein remains the largest industrial organization in the area. The company, with several hundred employees, has a fleet of large oceangoing fish-harvesting vessels supported by a number of spotter aircraft. Menhaden, once caught, are cooked in large mass and processed for further use in various applications including as a protein additive for poultry feed; Tyson Foods is a large customer.

Businesses in Reedville also offer sport fishing charters and regularly scheduled cruises to Tangier Island. Lodging in the small community is offered in bed and breakfast establishments and short-term rentals. Several large houses on Millionaire's Row are listed on the National Register of Historic Places. In 2008, newer homes were built in the last-remaining available lots on Millionaire's Row.

The Reedville Fisherman's Museum has restored the oldest home in the community; known as the Walker House, it houses the museum in conjunction with adjacent buildings. The museum also has two vessels, the skipjack Claude W. Somers and the deck boat Elva C, which were entered on the National Register of Historic Places in 2005. The museum, which dedicates itself to preserving the watermen's heritage, has historical information about Reedville, the Chesapeake Bay, and the menhaden fishing industry.
