= Elva C =

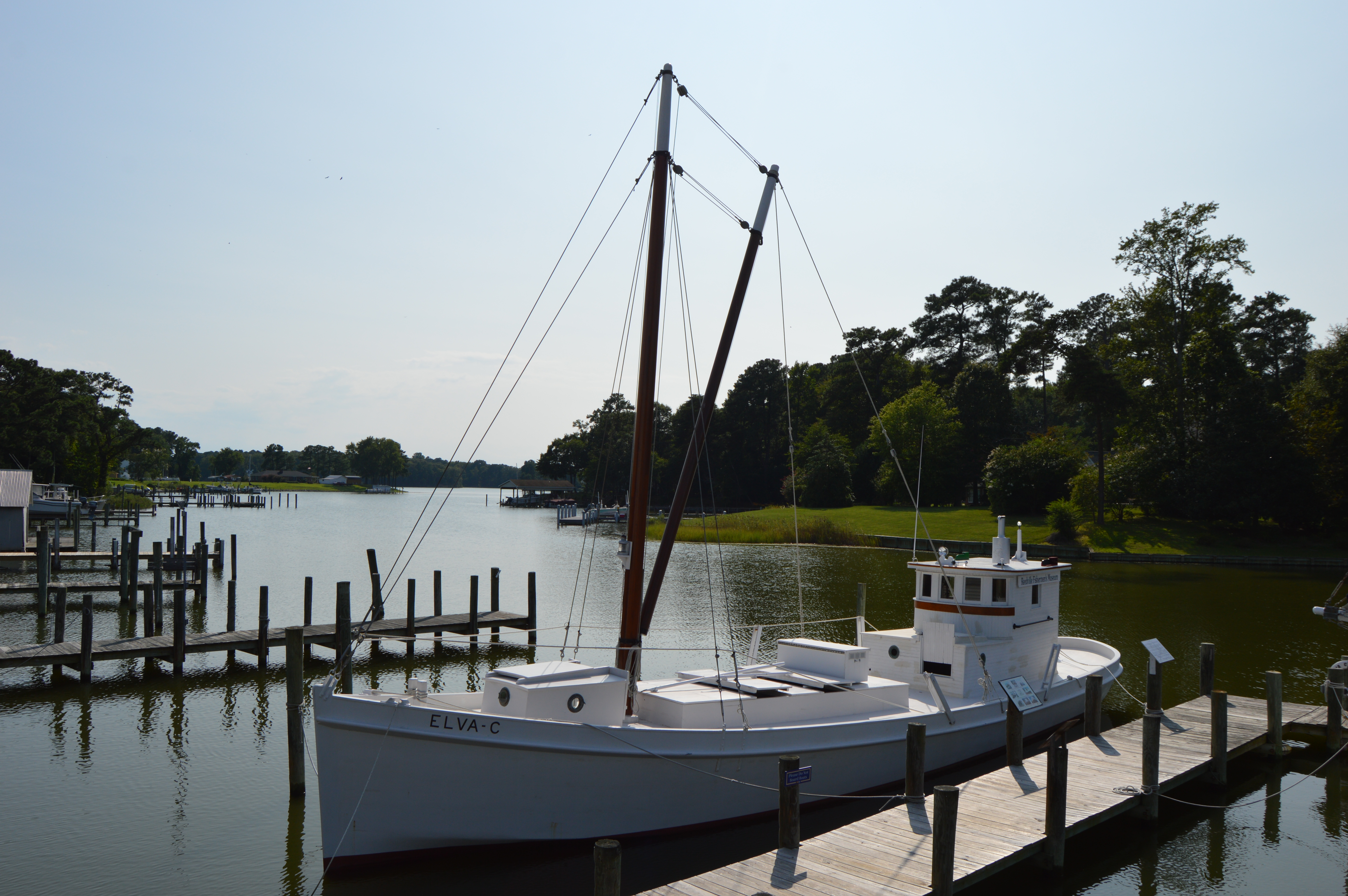
- Bow and port side, docked at Reedville

History
- Owner: Original owner was Captain Lee Abbott, and Final Owner was Captain Ira (Brother) F. Swift
- Builder: Gilbert White
- Launched: 1922

General characteristics
- Tonnage: 9 NRT
- Length: 55 ft 6 in (16.92 m)
- Beam: 13 ft 6 in (4.11 m)
- Draft: 3 ft 8.4 in (1.128 m)
- Notes: Donated to Reedville Fisherman’s Museum in 1989 by the Swift Family. The Elva C was restored by George Butler and is now used by the Reedville Fisherman’s Museum for tourist rides.
- ELVA C (Deck Boat)
- U.S. National Register of Historic Places
- Virginia Landmarks Register
- Location within Virginia Location within the United States
- Location: 504 Main St., Reedville, Virginia
- Coordinates: 37°50′38″N 76°16′35″W
- Area: less than one acre
- Built: 1922
- Built by: White, Gilbert
- Architectural style: Chesapeake Bay Deck Boat
- NRHP reference No.: 05001160
- VLR No.: 066-5048

Significant dates
- Added to NRHP: October 4, 2005
- Designated VLR: June 1, 2005

Elva C is a Chesapeake Bay deck boat, built in 1922 by Gilbert White, one of Virginia's best-known deck boat builders. She worked in fish trapping and in hauling. At one time, she hauled watermelons from North Carolina to Baltimore. She is ported at the Reedville Fisherman's Museum in Reedville, Virginia.

She was listed on the National Register of Historic Places in 2005.
