= Remo, Virginia =

Unincorporated community in Virginia, US

Coordinates: 37°48′57″N 76°21′10″W

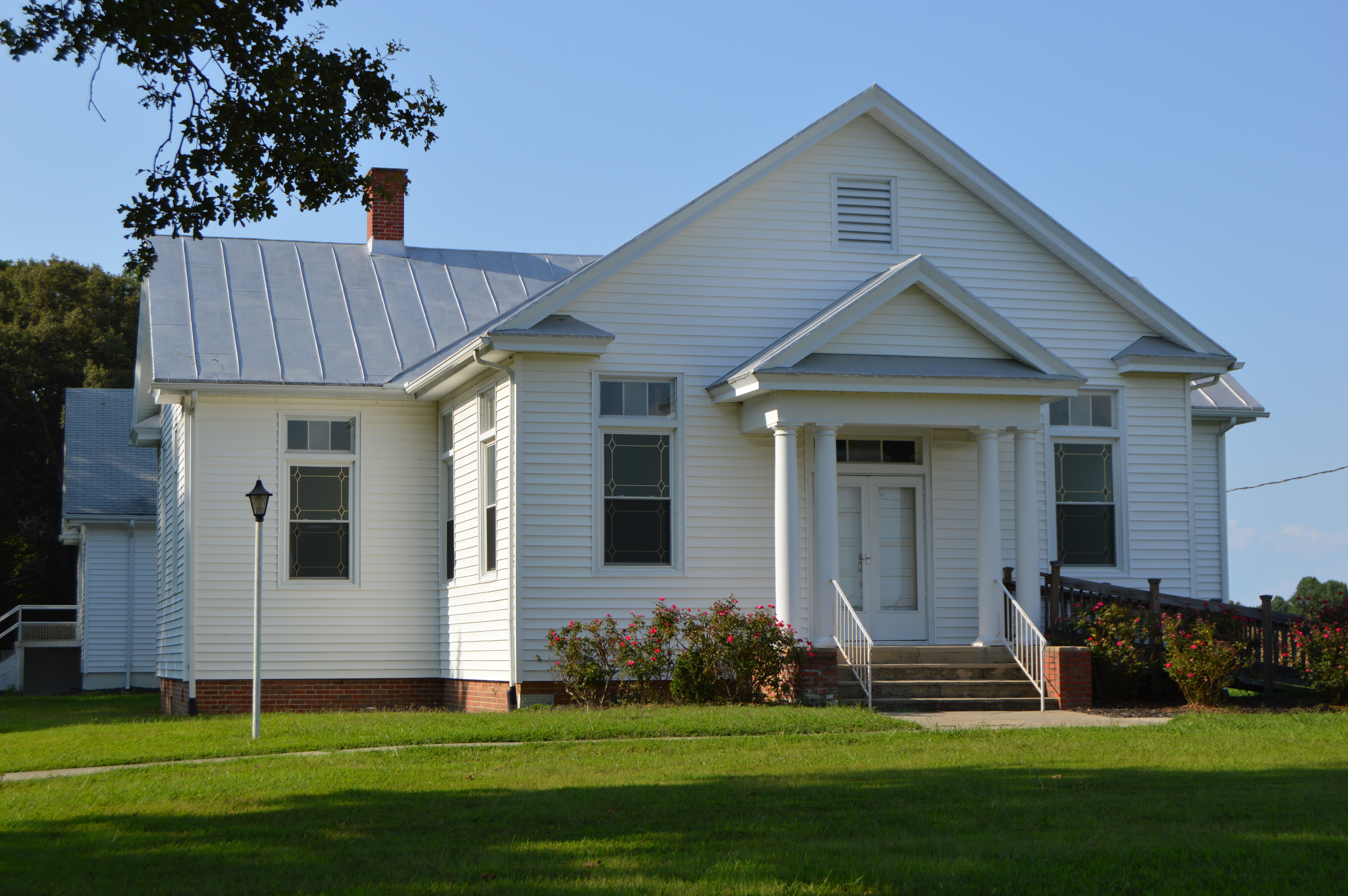
Wicomico Baptist Church

Remo is an unincorporated community in Northumberland County, in the U.S. state of Virginia.
