= Keith Atherton =

American baseball player (born 1959)

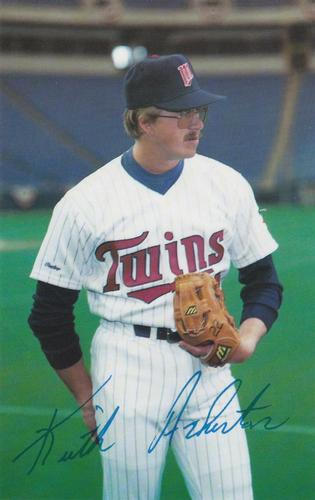
- Atherton in 1987
- Pitcher
- Born: February 19, 1959 (age 66); Newport News, Virginia, U.S.
- Batted: Right Threw: Right

MLB debut
- July 14, 1983, for the Oakland Athletics

Last MLB appearance
- August 5, 1989, for the Cleveland Indians

MLB statistics
- Win–loss record: 33–41
- Earned run average: 3.99
- Strikeouts: 349
- Stats at Baseball Reference

Teams
- Oakland Athletics (1983–1986); Minnesota Twins (1986–1988); Cleveland Indians (1989)

Career highlights and awards
- World Series champion (1987)

Keith Rowe Atherton (born February 19, 1959), is an American former professional baseball pitcher who played in Major League Baseball (MLB), primarily in relief, from 1983–1989. Atherton played for the Oakland Athletics (1983–1986), Minnesota Twins (1986–1988), and Cleveland Indians (1989).

== Biography ==
Atherton attended Mathews High School in Virginia and was drafted in the 2nd round of the 1978 Major League Baseball draft by Oakland. He debuted with the A's on July 14, 1983, and appeared in 29 games that season. He continued with Oakland for two more seasons pitching over 100 innings in both 1984 and 1985, all in relief. In May 1986, Oakland traded Atherton to the Minnesota Twins for a player to be named later and cash. He finished the season with a 6–10 record, but notched 10 saves, which led the Twins that year.

Atherton earned a World Series ring with the Twins in 1987. He appeared in two games in relief. Atherton and Les Straker both committed balks in the Series, which tied the record for most balks in a World Series.

In 1989, Atherton was traded to Cleveland for Carmen Castillo. Atherton struggled in Cleveland which led to the Indians sending him to the minor leagues for a short period. After his recall to the majors, Atherton suffered another rough outing in August that saw Cleveland offer him a chance to return to the minors to work on his pitching. He declined and was released by the club.

After leaving Cleveland, he signed with the Deltaville Deltas semi-pro club while he sought another opportunity in the majors. He signed a minor-league contract with the Montreal Expos in 1990 and later had a tryout with the Twins but left the tryout because of arm problems.

He currently resides in Mathews, Virginia, with his wife Christine.
