= Deltaville Ballpark =

Baseball park in Deltaville, Virginia

Coordinates: 37°33′22″N 76°20′36″W

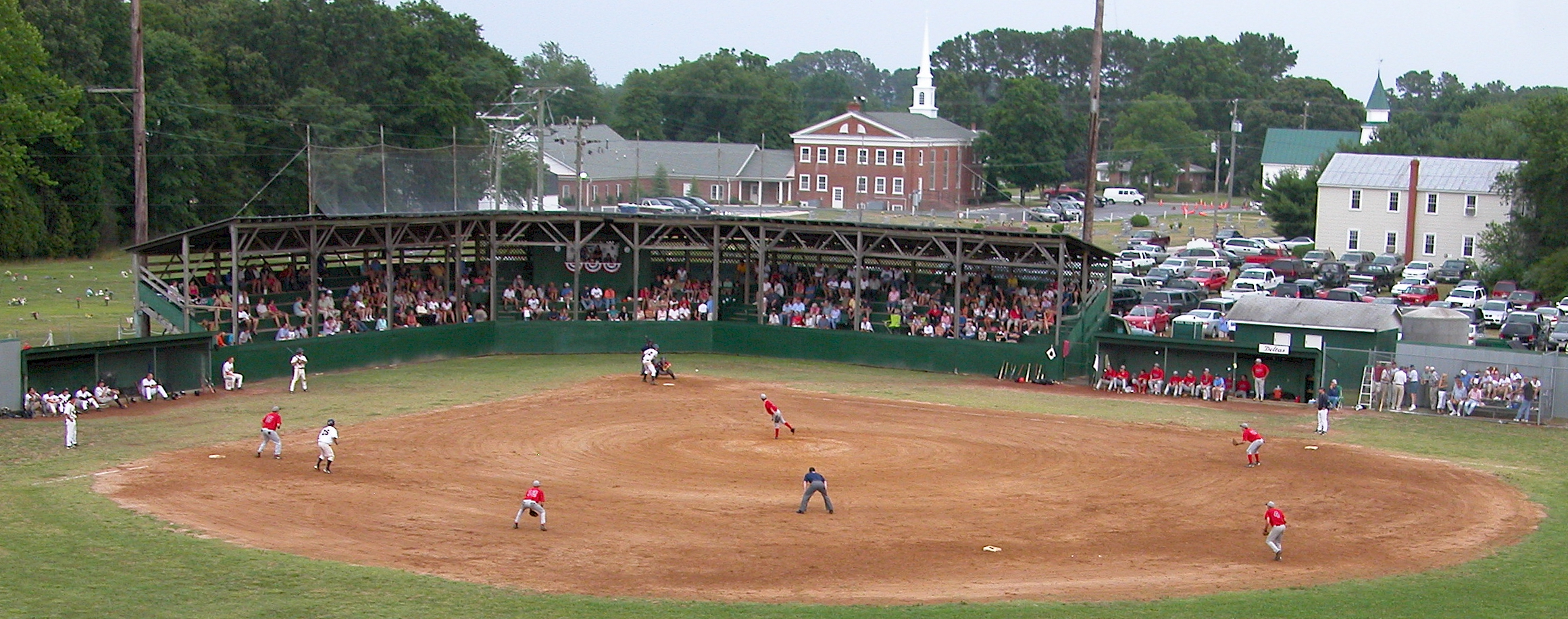
Deltaville Ballpark - Deltaville Deltas vs Navy Baseball, 2007

Deltaville Ballpark was originally built in 1948, and is owned by the Deltaville Community Association. Located at the end of Ballpark Road in Deltaville, Virginia, it hosts baseball games from several different teams and organizations.

== History ==
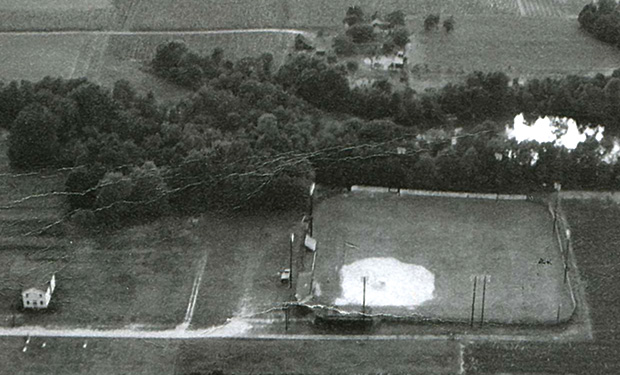
Early 1950s aerial photograph of Deltaville Ballpark

The ballpark was originally constructed in 1948 by local boatbuilders and craftsmen, and hosted its first game in June of that year. In 1976, the first major renovation occurred, when much of the grandstand was rebuilt due to concerns of structural stability. A second renovation occurred in 1996, which saw the construction of new dugouts and replacement of the outfield fence.

Most recently, between 2016 and 2024 a multi-year renovation was undertaken to continue to preserve and appropriately renovate the ballpark. Over the winter of 2016–17, the original 68-year-old roof was replaced. Contractors used custom-cut rough-sawn lumber to emulate the original wood, and metal roofing very similar to the original was installed. In 2020 phase 2 was completed, which primarily involved rebuilding a new concession building, which made way for an ADA-accessible entrance ramp into the grandstand, and refitting a partial row of seats to accept wheelchairs. The outdoor concourse area was also enlarged. Phase 3 was completed in 2022, replacing the antiquated original restrooms with new, enlarged ADA-accessible bathrooms and a family restroom. The lighting system, which contained elements from the original 1950's system and the upgraded 1980's system, was replaced with an LED lighting system custom fabricated to emulate the physical appearance of the original lights.

== Field and stadium ==
The wooden grandstands provide covered seating for approximately 300 fans. They are protected from foul balls by a crab pot wire fence. A small press box sits in the top two rows behind home plate; it has telephone connections to each dugout, scoreboard controls, microphone, and a PA/Music system.

Beside the home team dugout (3rd base line) is a small additional seating area with room for approximately 15–20 spectators.

The infield playing surface is skin, which drains remarkably well for a field of its type. Hundreds of holes are drilled beneath its surface, filled with rock to facilitate drainage. Outfield wall dimensions are 300-365-295, with the metal wall being approximately 9 feet tall. Even with the high wall, the short distance down the lines leads a large number of home runs. One of the light poles is home to an Osprey nest, whose occupants occasionally will leave remains of fish to be found by an unsuspecting player.

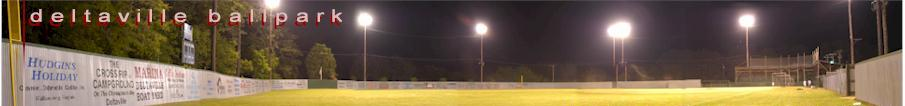
Panoramic shot of Deltaville Ballpark from left field

== Stadium users ==
A number of teams use the ballpark as their home field, and the ballpark sees regular use from late February through early November.

=== Current ===
==== Deltaville Deltas ====
The Deltaville Deltas baseball team is a semi-pro, 18+ wooden bat baseball team that can trace its roots back to before the ballpark was built. The ballpark has been home to the Deltas since its construction. The season typically begins around the second week of May, and continues through early August. Players are mostly college-aged players from the local area, with a number of former college & professional players also among the roster. Many players come from teams at Christopher Newport University, Lynchburg College, Randolph-Macon College, Norfolk State University, The Apprentice School, Old Dominion University, and several others. Two Major League Baseball World Series champions have pitched for the Deltas. Former Minnesota Twins pitcher Keith Atherton, a native of nearby Mathews County, as well as former New York Yankee Jim Coates of Lancaster County, pitched several post-MLB years for the Deltas. Both were members of MLB clubs that won the World Series.

Admission to Deltas games is $7 for adults, $3 for teens, and kids 12 & under free.

==== Middlesex Little League ====
Before the construction of the Middlesex Sports Complex, Deltaville Ballpark was one of the primary sites for playing baseball for Middlesex County youth. Since the construction of the complex, all 12-and-under games are played on the smaller 60-foot diamonds at the complex, as well as most of the 13- to 18-year-old games on the complex's 90' diamonds. However, on certain occasions, sometimes due to scheduling conflicts or just for the heck of it, games for the older group would be played at the ballpark, often with all the music, announcers, and other light fanfare that goes along with a typical game; however, this ceased after 2003.

In 2016, Deltaville Ballpark began an annual tradition of giving children an opportunity to play at the stadium again. "Little League Weekend at Deltaville Ballpark" schedules youth teams from 7–8 year old machine pitch through 15–16 year old Senior League a weekend of games at the stadium. As with all Little League games, admission to the event is free.

==== 241 Baseball ====
241 Baseball replaced American Legion baseball when the latter program ceased operating in the region after 2019. Roughly 150 players between the ages of 13 and 16 make up 10 teams from across 7 area counties. Deltaville Ballpark is one of two host fields for the league, the other being Lancaster County's "Dreamfields". The league typically plays two seasons, a summer season between late June and Labor Day which sees games played 4–5 nights per week, and a fall season in September & October which sees 2–3 games per week played.

=== Former ===
==== Middlesex High School Chargers ====
The local public high school, Middlesex High School, used the ballpark as its home game & practice field for the varsity baseball team between 1996 and 2014. Games began in early March, running through mid-May or later. The high school hosted the Rappahannock General Hospital Invitational Tournament each spring, a warmup tournament for Middlesex and three invited opponents. The ballpark also hosted the Tidewater District tournament, and has played host to Middlesex home games of the Region A tournament, and in 2002, State Group A Quarterfinals.

In 2015, the Syd Thrift Athletic Complex was opened on the campus of the high school, and the baseball teams moved to the new field at the complex.

In 2019, Middlesex High School returned to the ballpark for a one-game stint, with intentions on the game becoming an annual special event. 2020's follow up, along with 2 other scheduled high school games with other area high school teams, were cancelled due to COVID-19. However, when state health regulations allowed later in the summer, the ballpark hosted a "Senior Game" doubleheader. In that event, 46 seniors from 10 area high schools came together to form 4 teams and play a "final game" in their school colors, and were recognized in a "senior walk" with their parents and coaches on the field between games.

==== Middle Peninsula Mariners ====
The Middle Peninsula Mariners team was formed in the 1990s as a second semi-pro team to call Deltaville home. Like the Deltas, played with wood bats & a schedule which ran from May through early August. Players were mostly college-aged or former college players, with many on the roster coming from area Division III college baseball teams. The Mariners played in the Virginia Baseball League until 2009, and won the 2008 & 2009 league titles. The Mariners are no longer active as of the 2011 season. They last played an abbreviated schedule as an independent team in 2010.

For many years from the 1990s until 2010, the "cross-town" Deltas & Mariners played each other at the ballpark. Sometimes dubbed "The Battle for the Ballpark", this event always drew large crowds, and generally, a good baseball game. Area players were in both lineups, and many fans of both teams know a number of players from either side. The teams each played one home game, the opponent having to be "visitor" at their own field once a year.

=== Other uses ===
The ballpark has been used for several other events in the past. These include recreational softball, pickup baseball games, charitable events (memorable charity events include a womanless wedding show, outdoor concerts, and donkey baseball games), as well as other events suited to the ballpark.

== Heritage Day ==
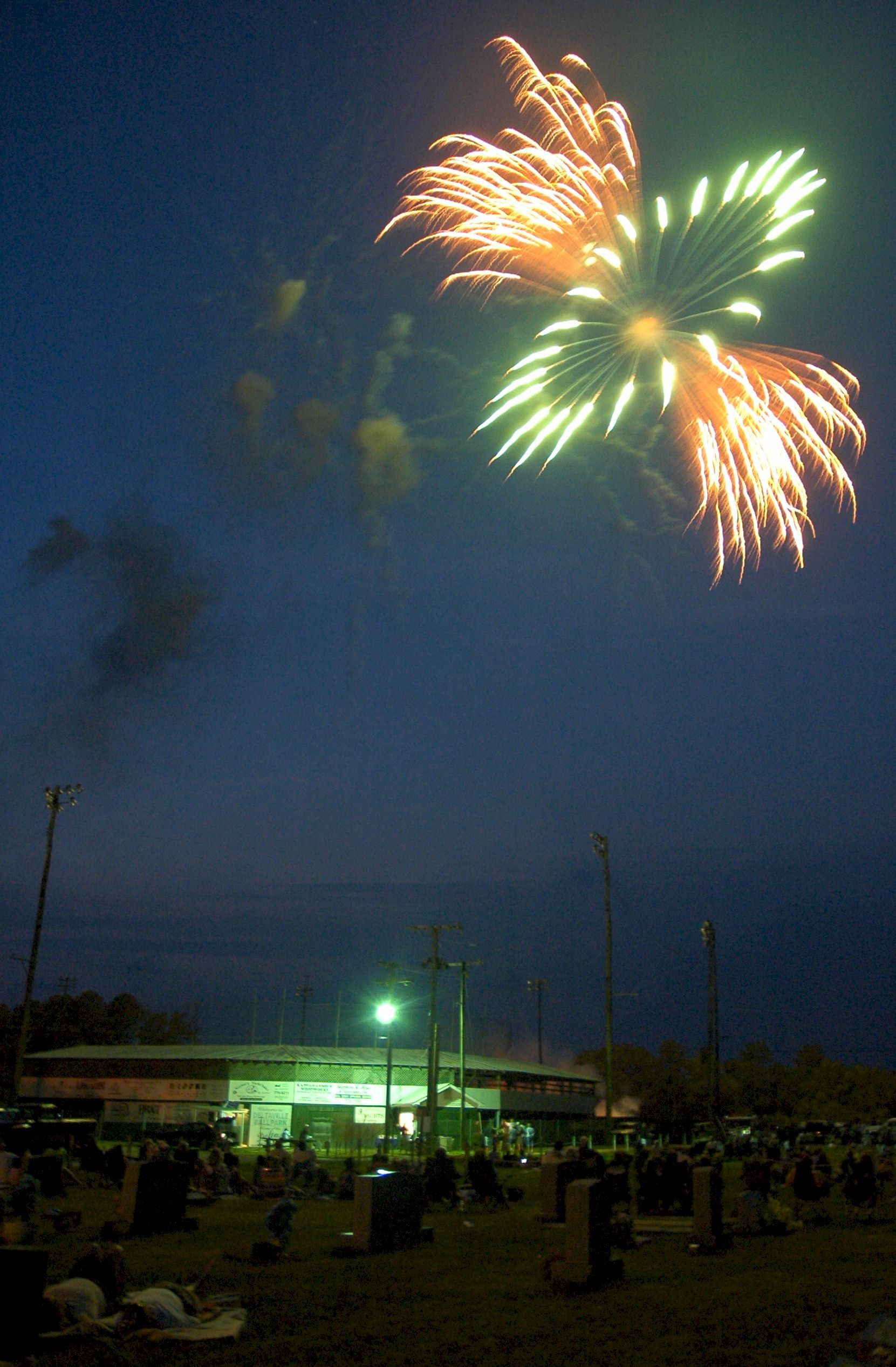
Fireworks at the Ballpark on Heritage Day

For decades, on or about the 4th of July, a Saturday event known as Heritage Day occurred in Deltaville. The day was filled with arts & crafts, crab races, and even a parade, and was capped off each year by a Deltas game at the ballpark. Traditionally the opponent was the longtime Deltas rival Tappahannock Tides, however, from 2007–2013 the opponent was another team from the Deltas league. The game time was moved up from the traditional 7:30pm start time to 5:00pm, and was followed by a short "Old-Timers Game", in which former Deltaville players of all ages relived their playing days for a couple of innings. This was all followed at approximately 8:45pm, with a large fireworks display to celebrate Independence Day. The grandstands are typically filled to capacity for this game, and fans will venture into the infield once the lights go out to watch the fireworks unobstructed. More than a thousand more will bring blankets & lawn chairs to enjoy the fireworks from the large field beside the ballpark.

The Deltaville Community Association abandoned Heritage Day in 2014, in favor of a new event, the Deltaville Seafood Festival, which is held on another weekend, typically in May. Fireworks have not been fired at the ballpark since 2012, though there have been attempts to revive the town's Independence Day celebration.
