= Beverlyville, Virginia =

Unincorporated community in Virginia, US

Coordinates: 37°51′54″N 76°16′52″W

Beverlyville is an unincorporated community in Northumberland County, in the U.S. state of Virginia.
