= F.D. Crockett =

- U.S. National Register of Historic Places
- Virginia Landmarks Register
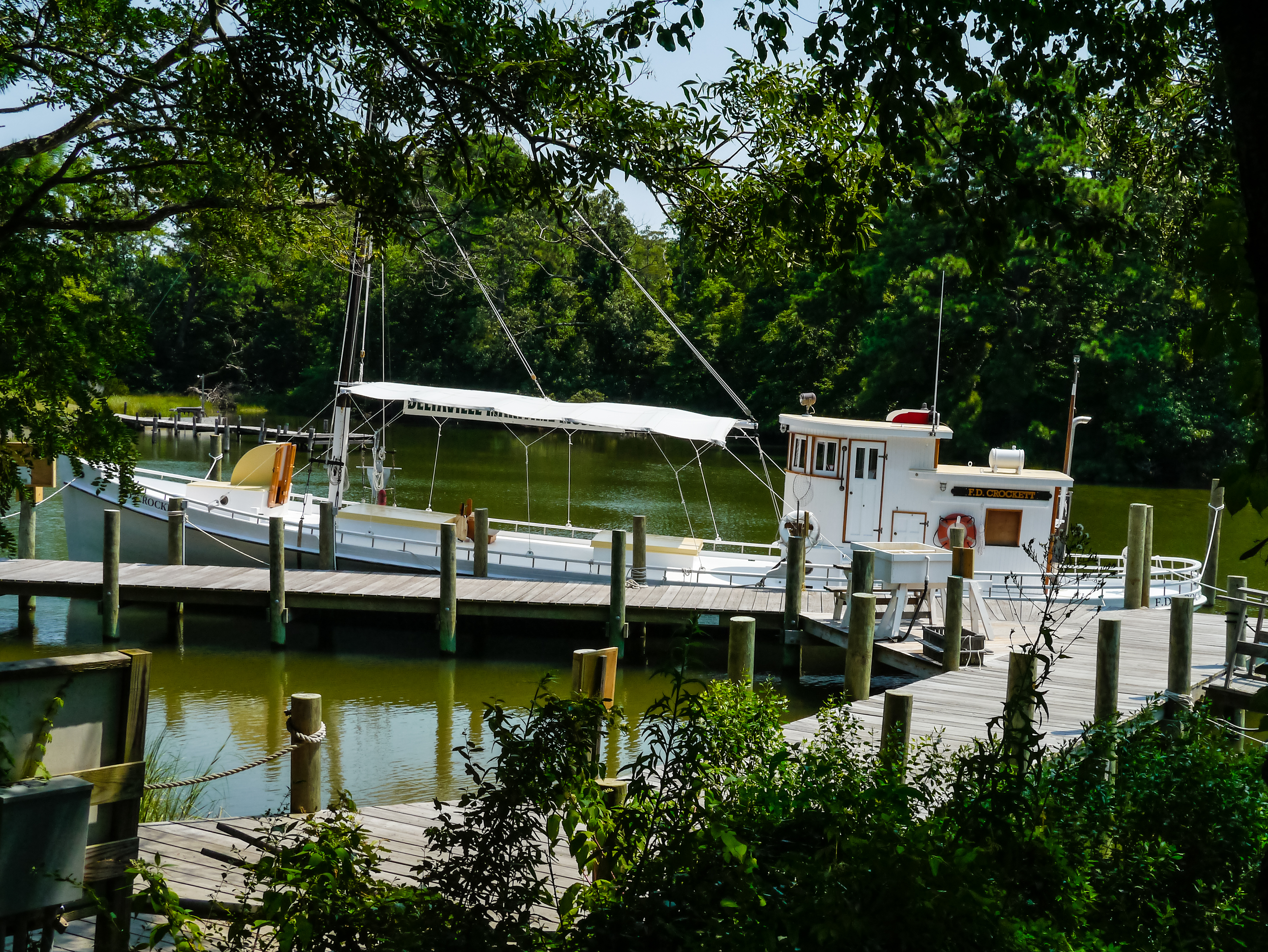
- July 2012

- Location within Virginia Location within the United States
- Location: 287 Jackson Creek Rd. (Deltaville Maritime Museum), near Deltaville, Virginia
- Coordinates: 37°33′10″N 76°19′36″W
- Area: 8 acres (3.2 ha)
- Built: c. 1924
- Built by: Alexander Gaines
- NRHP reference No.: 12000544
- VLR No.: 059-5013

Significant dates
- Added to NRHP: August 22, 2012
- Designated VLR: June 21, 2012

F.D. Crockett is a Poquoson-style Chesapeake Bay log-built oyster buy-boat, built in 1924 in Seaford, Virginia, by Alexander Gaines. The length of the boat is 62.8 feet (19.1 m) overall, 55.8 foot keel length, with a beam of 15.7 feet and draft of 4.6 feet. The gross tonnage is 28, net tonnage 16. The F.D. Crockett was built primarily for freight hauling and the buying and transporting of produce. She is ported at the Deltaville Maritime Museum near Deltaville, Virginia. She is on display for educational purposes and travels the Chesapeake Bay as an ambassador for the museum.

She was listed on the National Register of Historic Places in 2012.
