= Cowart, Virginia =

Unincorporated community in Virginia, US

Coordinates: 37°59′43″N 76°28′19″W

Cowart is an unincorporated community in Northumberland County, in the U.S. state of Virginia.
