= Claude W. Somers (skipjack) =

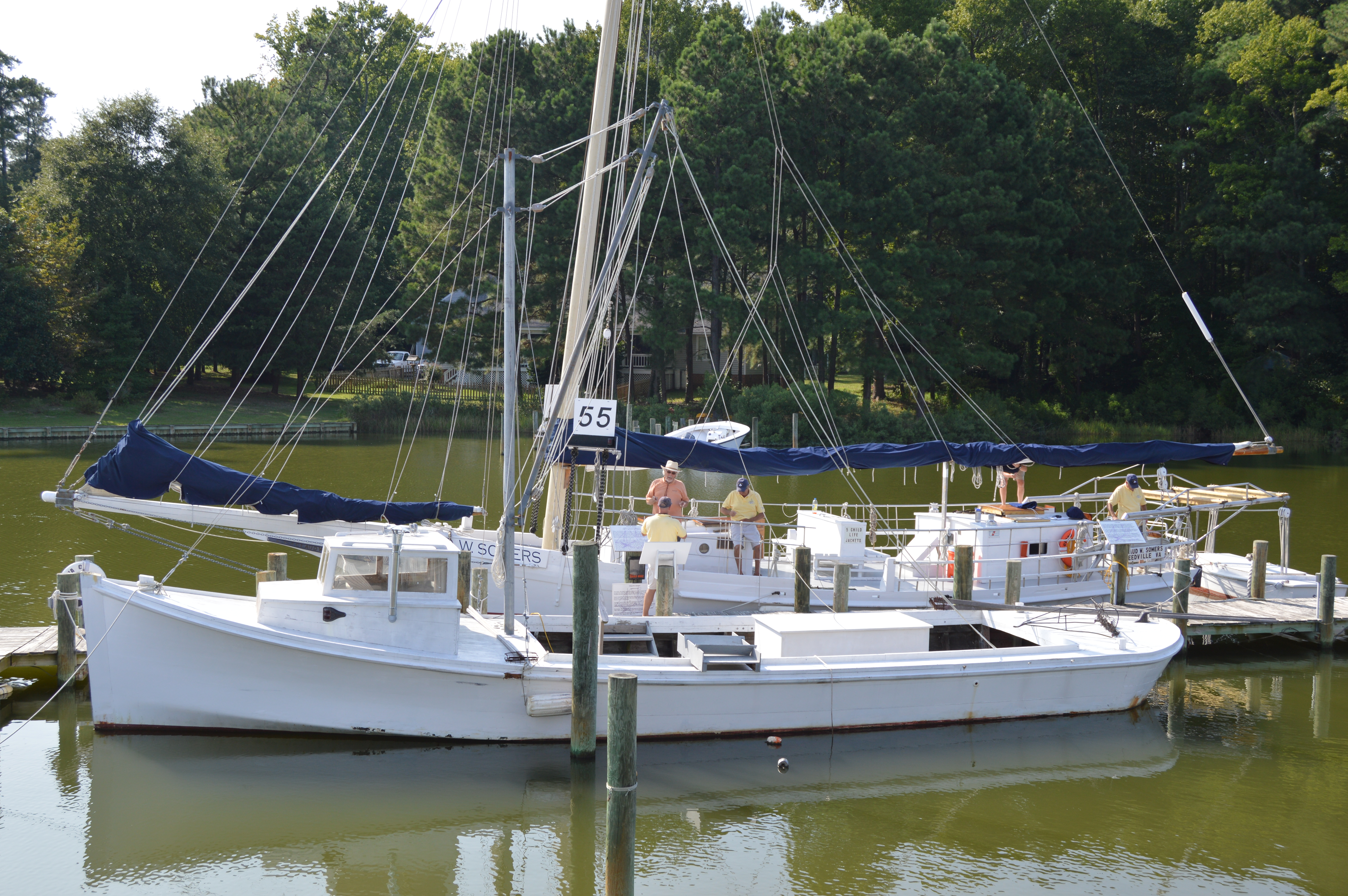
- Docking at Reedville next to another boat

History
- Builder: W. Thomas Young
- Launched: 1911

General characteristics
- Tonnage: 6 NRT
- Length: 42 ft 6 in (12.95 m)
- Beam: 14 ft (4.3 m)
- Depth: 3 ft (0.91 m)
- Claude W. Somers
- U.S. National Register of Historic Places
- Virginia Landmarks Register
- Location within Virginia Location within the United States
- Location: 504 Main St., Reedville, Virginia
- Coordinates: 37°50′37″N 76°16′36″W
- Built: 1911
- MPS: Chesapeake Bay Skipjack Fleet TR
- NRHP reference No.: 85001085 (MD), 05000526(VA)
- VLR No.: 066-5049

Significant dates
- Added to NRHP: 16 May 1985 (MD), 7 October 2005 (VA)
- Designated VLR: March 16, 2005

Claud W. Somers is a Chesapeake Bay skipjack, built in 1911 in Young's Creek, Virginia, by W. Thomas Young of Parksley, who also built Bernice J.. She is ported at the Reedville Fisherman's Museum in Reedville, Virginia. In 1977 Claude W. Somers was struck by a squall near Hooper Strait Light, leaving six drowned, including her owner-captain.

She was listed on the National Register of Historic Places in Maryland in 1985 and in Virginia in 2005. She is an exhibit at the Reedville Fishermen's Museum in Reedville, Virginia. She is assigned Maryland dredge number 55.
