= Avalon, Virginia =

Unincorporated community in Virginia, United States

Avalon
- Unincorporated community
- Location within the Commonwealth of Virginia Avalon (the United States)
- Coordinates: 36°48′15.5″N 76°16′15.1″W
- Country: United States
- State: Virginia
- County: Northumberland
- Elevation: 102 ft (31 m)
- Time zone: UTC-05:00 (Eastern (EST))
  - Summer (DST): UTC-04:00 (EDT)
- GNIS feature ID: 1477085

Avalon is an unincorporated community in Northumberland County, in the U.S. state of Virginia.
