= Reedville Fishermen's Museum =

Fishing museum in Reedville, Virginia

Coordinates: 37.8435°N 76.2753°W

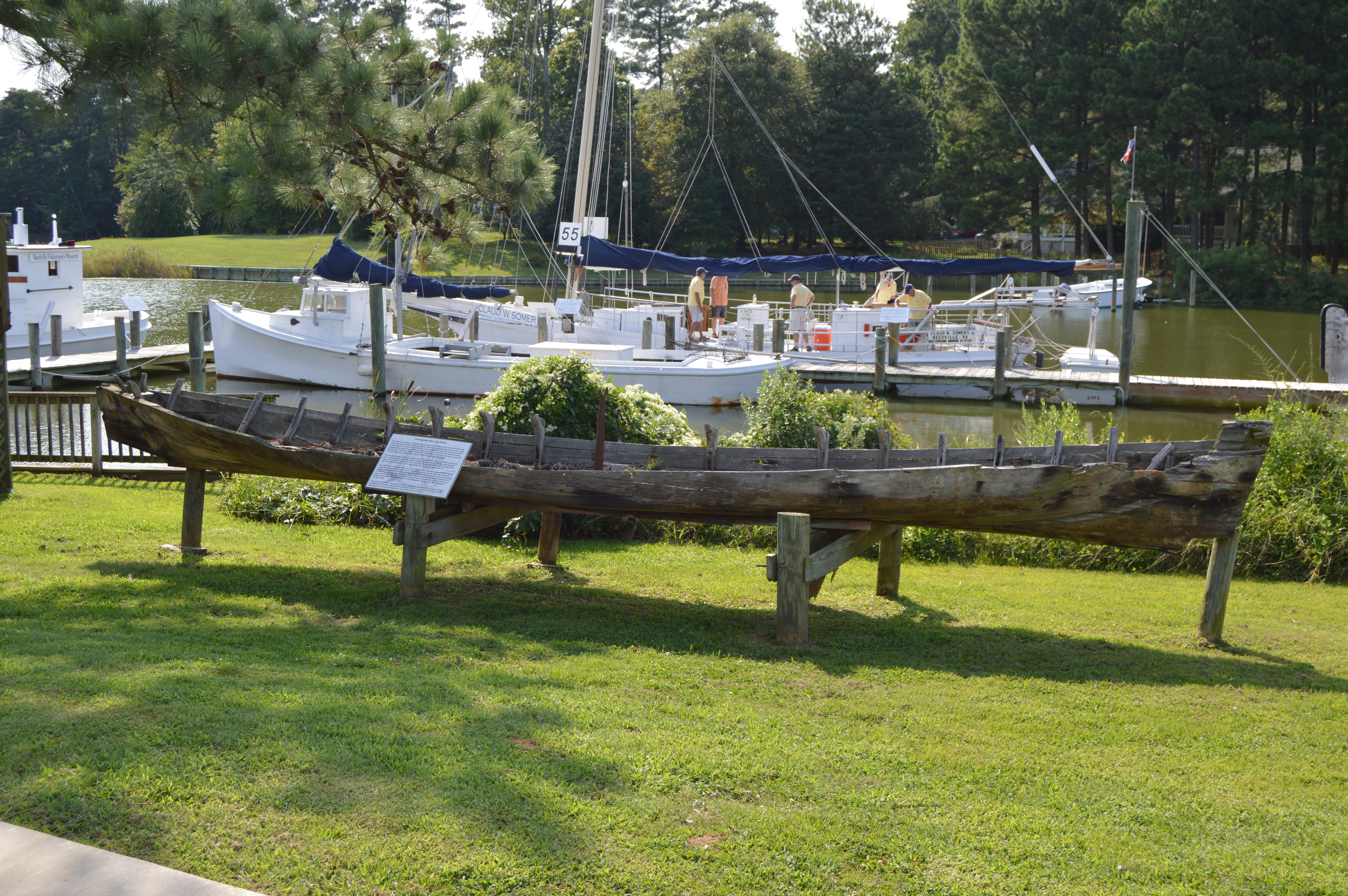
The museum's log canoe, with Claude W. Somers in the background

Reedville Fishermen's Museum is located in the unincorporated town of Reedville along the western shore of the Chesapeake Bay in Northumberland County, Virginia.

Reedville has a long heritage in the Atlantic menhaden fishing industry, and the museum dedicates itself to preserving the watermen's heritage and that of Reedville.

The museum has restored some of the oldest homes on the community's "Millionaire's Row", where wealthy factory owners and fishing boat captains once lived. The mansions are now on the National Register of Historic Places. The museum also has two vessels, the skipjack Claude W. Somers and the deck boat Elva C., which were entered into the National Register of Historic Places in 2005.

Open for tours, the museum also has historical information about the menhaden fishing industry and the history of Reedville.

== See also ==
- List of maritime museums in the United States
