= Fairport, Virginia =

Unincorporated community in Virginia, US

Coordinates: 37°50′00″N 76°17′25″W

Fairport is an unincorporated community in Northumberland County, in the U.S. state of Virginia.
