= Deltaville, Virginia =

Unincorporated village in Virginia, US

Coordinates: 37°33′17″N 76°20′13″W

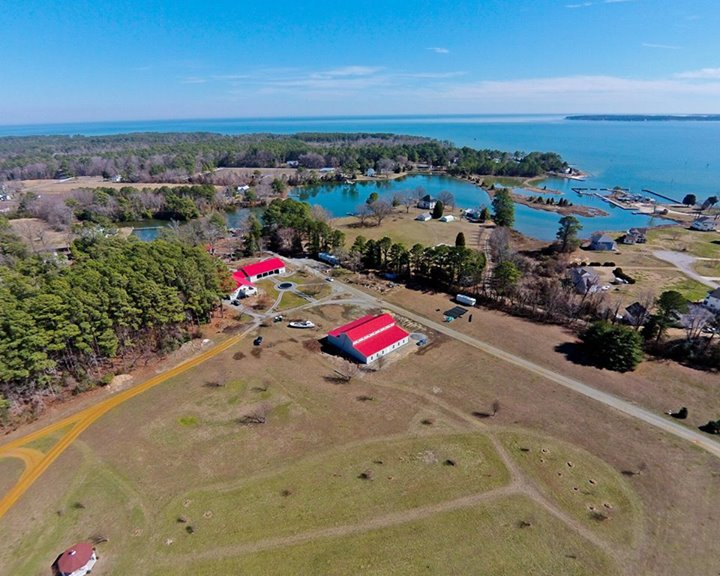
The Deltaville Maritime Museum

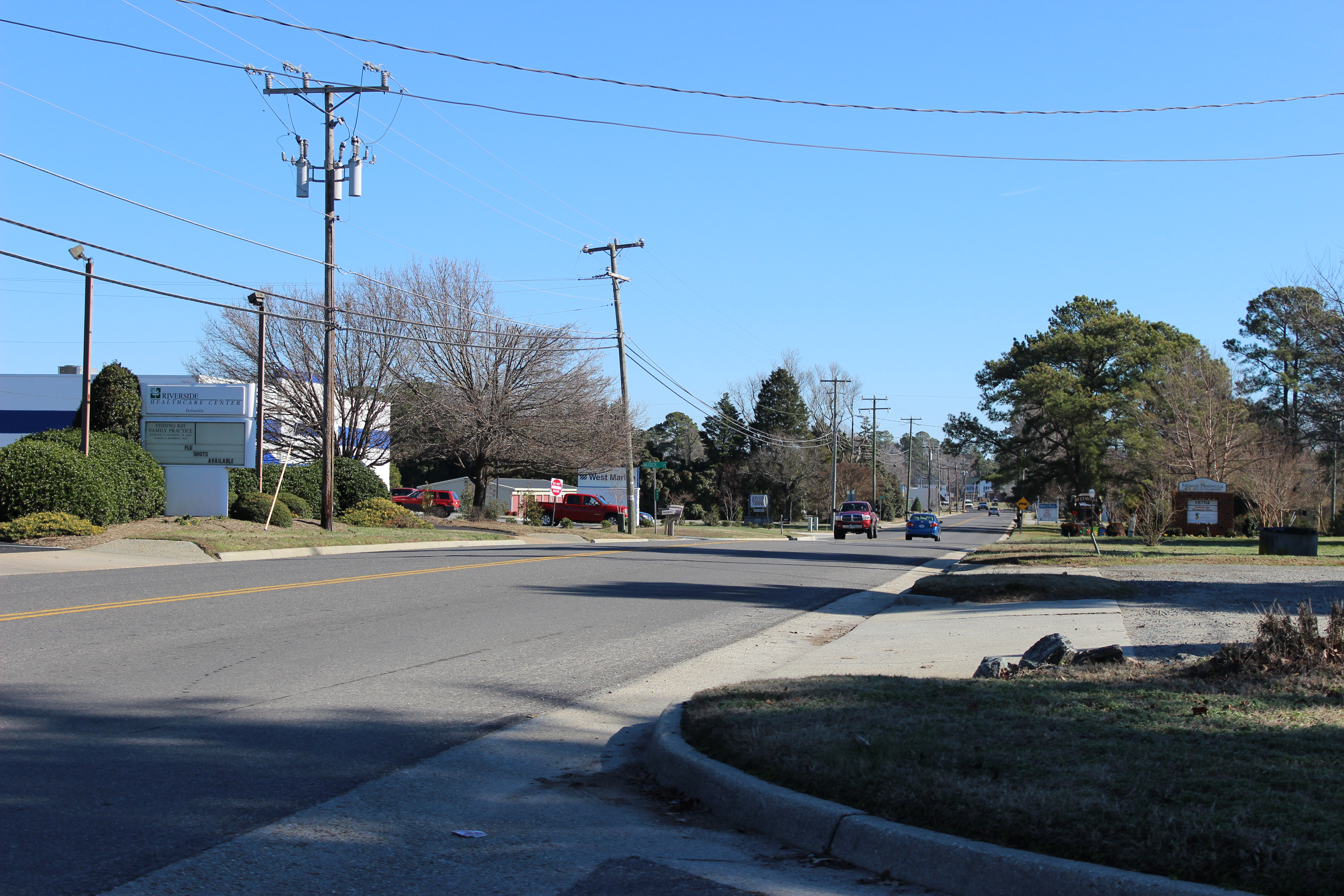
A view of Deltaville

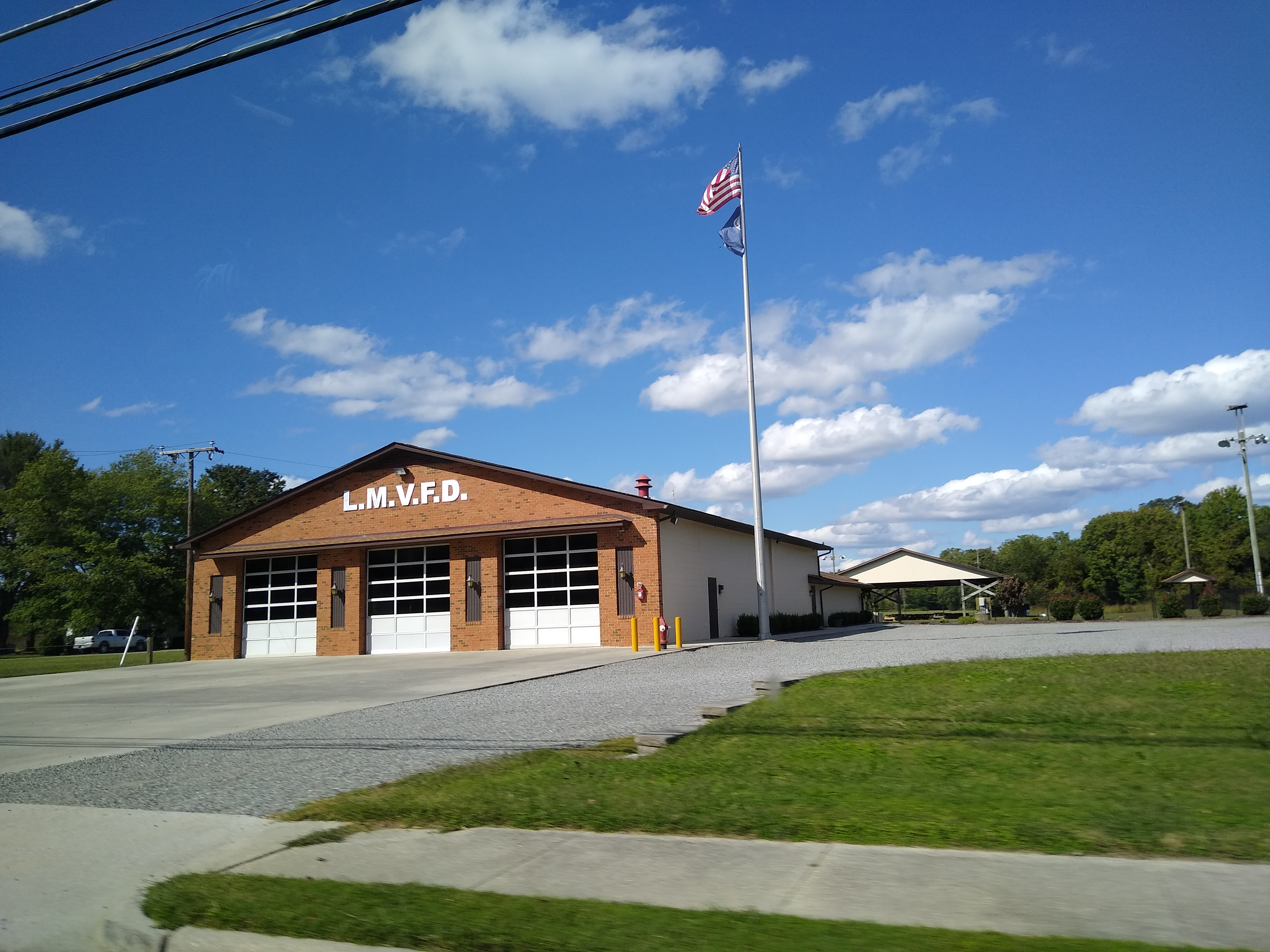
Lower Middlesex Volunteer Fire Department fire station

Deltaville is a small unincorporated community and census-designated place on the eastern tip of Middlesex County in the eastern part of the U.S. state of Virginia. As of the 2020 census, Deltaville had a population of 1,057. It is known for being a vacation spot with sailing, fishing, and other water activities. The town developed around being a large boat building area, mostly for commercial bay watermen. However, those days have passed and the area is now dotted with numerous marinas, boatyards, and marine related businesses. The Deltaville ZIP code is 23043.

== History ==
Originally known as Sandy Bottom, the community decided to change the town name in 1909. The name Delta was proposed, because of the shape of the town, as it is bordered by the Rappahannock River to the North, the Piankatank River to the south, and the Chesapeake Bay to the east. There was a Delta, Virginia already in existence, so "ville" was tacked onto the end.

Deltaville has been home for over a half century to a semi-pro baseball team, the Deltas. The 1948 vintage Deltaville Ballpark is their home field. Other activities in the town include a town pool, tennis courts, basketball court, and playground, and a community center, all built and maintained by a volunteer Board of the Deltaville Community Association, a (501)(c)(3) organization.

The Deltaville Maritime Museum and Holly Point Nature Park, home to the Nationally registered historic buyboat, the F.D. Crockett, is located in Deltaville at 287 Jackson Creek Road. Situated on 36 acres crossing both the waters of Mill Creek and Jackson Creek Road, this water accessible park acts as a setting for the Museum, the multi-purpose events pavilion, outside exhibits and the waterfront performance area. Founded in 2002, the Museum and Park's mission is to preserve and present the history of Chesapeake Bay watermen, their workboats, fisheries, and methods. The Museum and Park also host farmer's markets, plays, concerts, and Holiday events throughout the year.

The tip end of Deltaville is Stingray Point, named by Captain John Smith on July 17, 1608. According to Captain John Smith's Generall Historie:

He was stung by a stingray there while exploring the bay. Captain Smith is said to have given orders for his men to dig a grave because he believed himself to be dying from the sting. Walter Russell, a doctor of physic, and also a member of Smith's crew, applied a "precious oil" to Smith's wound. The Captain recovered sufficiently to eat the stingray for his dinner that evening.

The legend that a cure was given to Smith by local Native Americans, who lived along what is now called Antipoison Creek, has been largely been discredited.

On the evening of April 16, 2011, the community was struck by a devastating tornado. Prior to reaching Deltaville the storm had torn a path from North Carolina to the Chesapeake Bay. With wind gust estimated 135 mph it only took minutes to cause approximately US$6.8 million in damages. The tornado touched down near Porpoise Cove, on the south side of Deltaville, and ran a northeast path, destroying 32 homes, along with Zoar Baptist Church, the Community Association Pool, and severely damaged the community hall. Despite injuries, no one was killed.

The F.D. Crockett was listed on the National Register of Historic Places in 2012.

The Middlesex County Board of Supervisors approved a resolution on October 2, 2012, supporting the efforts of the official naming, "Deltaville, The Boating Capital of the Chesapeake Bay."

== Demographics ==
Historical population
Census	Pop.	Note	%±
2010	1,119		—
2020	1,057		−5.5%
U.S. Decennial Census; 2010 2020

Deltaville was first listed as a census designated place in the 2010 U.S. census.

The Census Bureau defines Deltaville as a census-designated place (CDP) with a population of 1,119 as of 2010. As of the 2020 Census, the town had a population of 1,057. According the 2020 Census as well, Deltaville has a 42.9% employment rate, a median income $66,905 with a 6.1% poverty rate, and a total of 1,188 houses with 394 occupied by families. Of the population, 927 are white, 37 are mixed, 29 are black, 27 are Hispanic, 8 are Native American, 3 are Asian, and 8 are other. 33% of the population is 65 years old or older.

== Sources ==
National Historic Registry Sign in Hartfield, Virginia, "A Portrait of Deltaville 25th Anniversary Edition"
