= Coan, Virginia =

Unincorporated community in Virginia, US

Coordinates: 37°57′30″N 76°28′49″W

Coan is an unincorporated community in Northumberland County, in the U.S. state of Virginia.
