= Browns Store, Virginia =

Unincorporated community in Virginia, US

Coordinates: 37°49′44″N 76°25′44″W

Browns Store is an unincorporated community in Northumberland County, in the U.S. state of Virginia.
