= William B. Tennison (bugeye) =

- William B. Tennison (Chesapeake Bay Bugeye)
- U.S. National Register of Historic Places
- U.S. National Historic Landmark
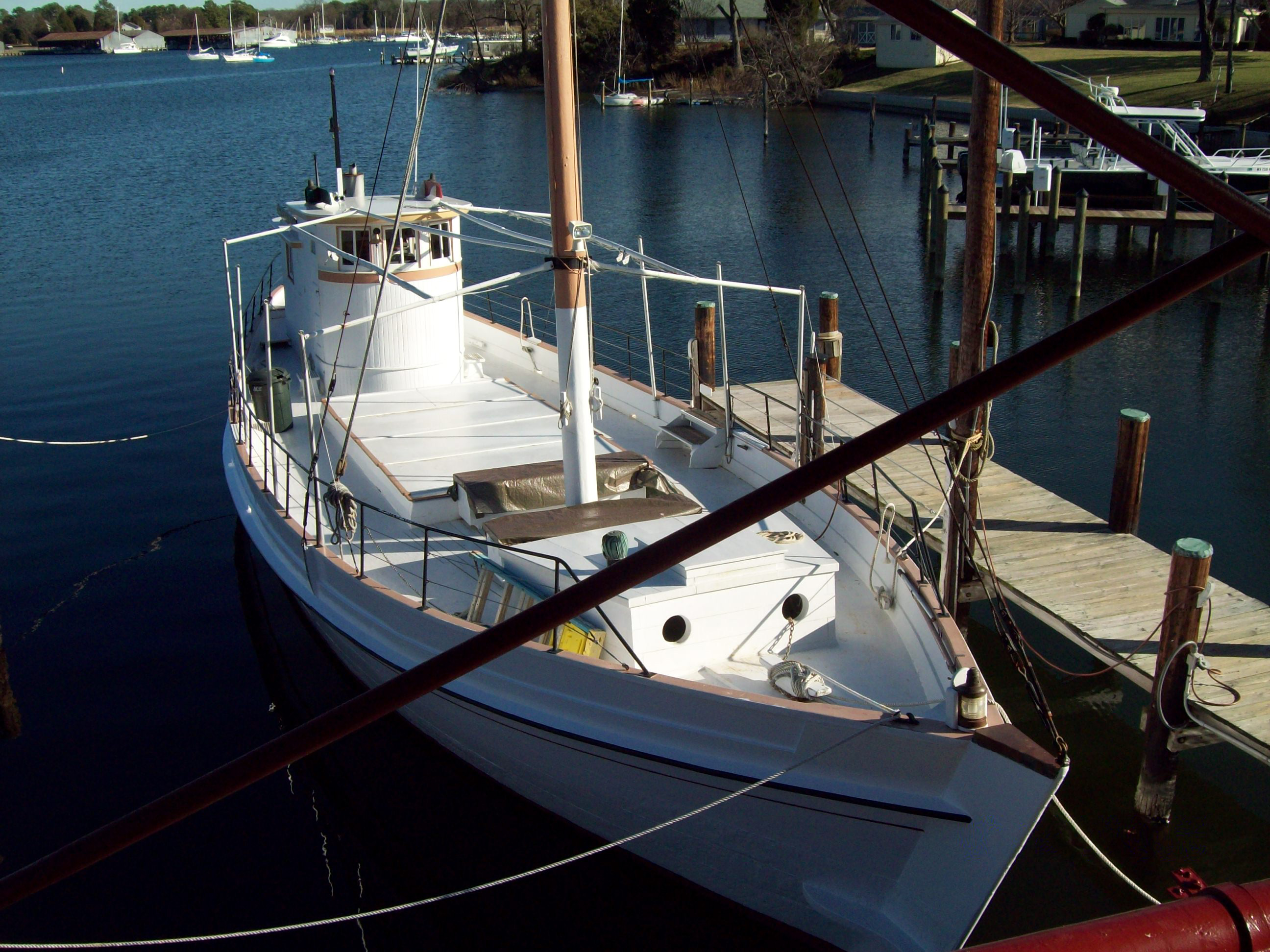
- William B. Tennison Solomons, Maryland, December 2008

- Location within Maryland Location within the United States
- Location: Solomons, Maryland
- Coordinates: 38°19′30″N 76°27′39″W
- Built: 1899
- Architect: B.P. Miles, Frank Laird
- NRHP reference No.: 80001799

Significant dates
- Added to NRHP: March 27, 1980
- Designated NHL: April 19, 1994

The William B. Tennison is a Chesapeake Bay bugeye built in 1899 and converted to an oyster buy-boat in 1906–07. With the conversion her sail rig was removed and an engine inserted, and is the only surviving example of this conversion. Her construction marks a transition between log construction and plank construction. She is homeported at the Calvert Marine Museum in Solomons, Maryland. The Tennison is reputed to be the second oldest licensed passenger vessel in the United States.

It was listed on the National Register of Historic Places in 1980, and as a National Historic Landmark in 1994.

== Description ==
The William B. Tennison was built as a nine-log sailing bugeye, using pitch pine logs, 9 inches (23 cm) thick at the keel and tapering to 6 inches (15 cm) at the outer edges. She is 60.5 feet (18.4 m) long on deck and has a beam of 17.5 feet (5.3 m) with a draft of 4.5 feet (1.4 m). The hull form is flat-bottomed with rounded chines, and is sharp at each end. Framing and planking are built up above the logs for freeboard, using oak frames at approximate 30-inch (76 cm) centers. A bulkhead separates the foc'sle from the hold. A second bulkhead was added when she was converted to power between the hold and the engine compartment. At the same time the centerboard trunk was removed. A "patent stern" was added to square the deck above the sharp stern and add working space. A portion of the rudder has been cut away to allow for a propeller.

For her conversion to a buy-boat the Tennisons mainmast and the running rigging to the foremast, necessary for sailing, were removed. The foremast was then used to hoist bushel-sized oyster baskets from other vessels to the hold using two gaff-rigged booms. A pilothouse with a rounded from was added, as is typical in Chesapeake Bay buy-boats. Three windows occupy the front, with one window and a door on each side. The pilothouse is covered with vertical tongue and groove cypress siding. Two bunks are on the port side aft, along with an enclosed head aft. A floor hatch gives access to the engine compartment. The foc'sle once housed three bunks, a table and a cookstove.

== History ==
The William B. Tennison was built in 1899 by Frank Laird of Monie, Maryland at Crabb Island, near Oriole, Maryland. She was built relatively late for a bugeye, as the type was going out of style in favor of the smaller, cheaper skipjack. Benjamin P. and Rufus L. Miles of Monie used her as an oyster dredge until 1908-09 when she was converted to power. In 1910 the Tennison was sold to Alphonse Lafayette Hazelwood of Eclipse, Virginia who used her to haul produce in the Norfolk and Albemarle Sound area until 1930. During the oyster season she was used as a buy-boat. Her original 37 horsepower engine was replaced with a 60-horsepower engine during this time. She was sold to Barney B. Winnal of Carrollton, Virginia in 1933 for $2050. After her sale to O.A. Bloxom of the Battery Park Fish and Oyster Company near Smithfield, Virginia, she was sold in 1944 to J.C Lore and Sons of Solomons, Maryland. The Lores used Tennison to dredge oysters on their private beds, where power could be used, and as a buy-boat.

The Tennison was partially rebuilt at the H. Krentz Railway in Harryhogan, Virginia in 1952. The pilot house was rebuilt during this time. She was beached by Hurricane Hazel in 1952, and the scar from being dragged over an obstruction to refloat her is reputedly still visible when she is hauled out of the water. In 1955 a Gray Marine 155-horsepower diesel engine was installed, possibly having been taken from a naval landing craft. She was converted to a passenger boat in 1977, with nearly all of the structural frames replaced at that time.

The identity of her namesake, William B. Tennison, remains unknown.

== See also ==
- J. C. Lore Oyster House, where the Tennison is homeported, also a National Historic Landmark
- List of National Historic Landmarks in Maryland
- National Register of Historic Places listings in Calvert County, Maryland

== Gallery ==
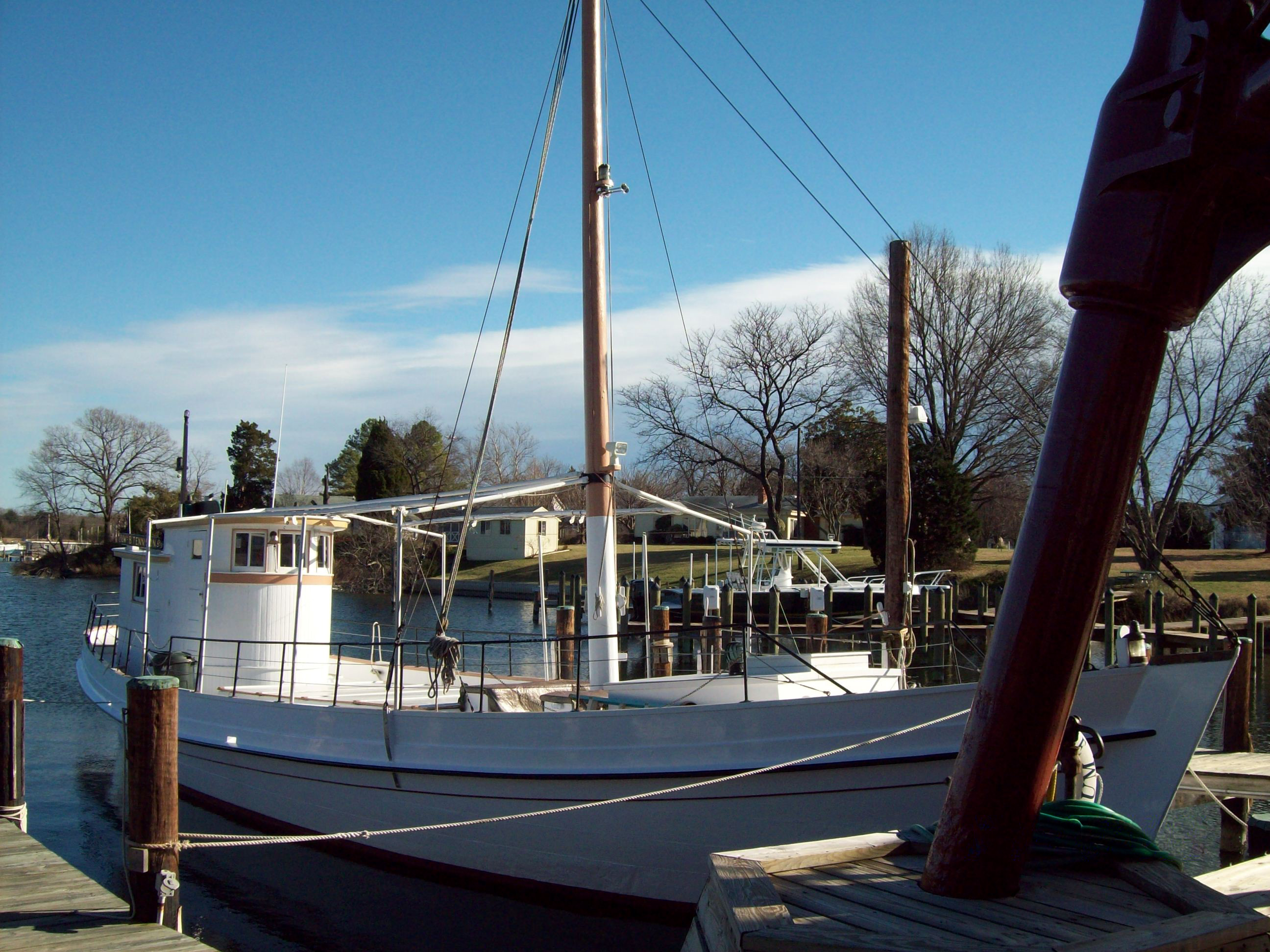
Oyster buy-boats like the Tennison carried sale well into the 20th century

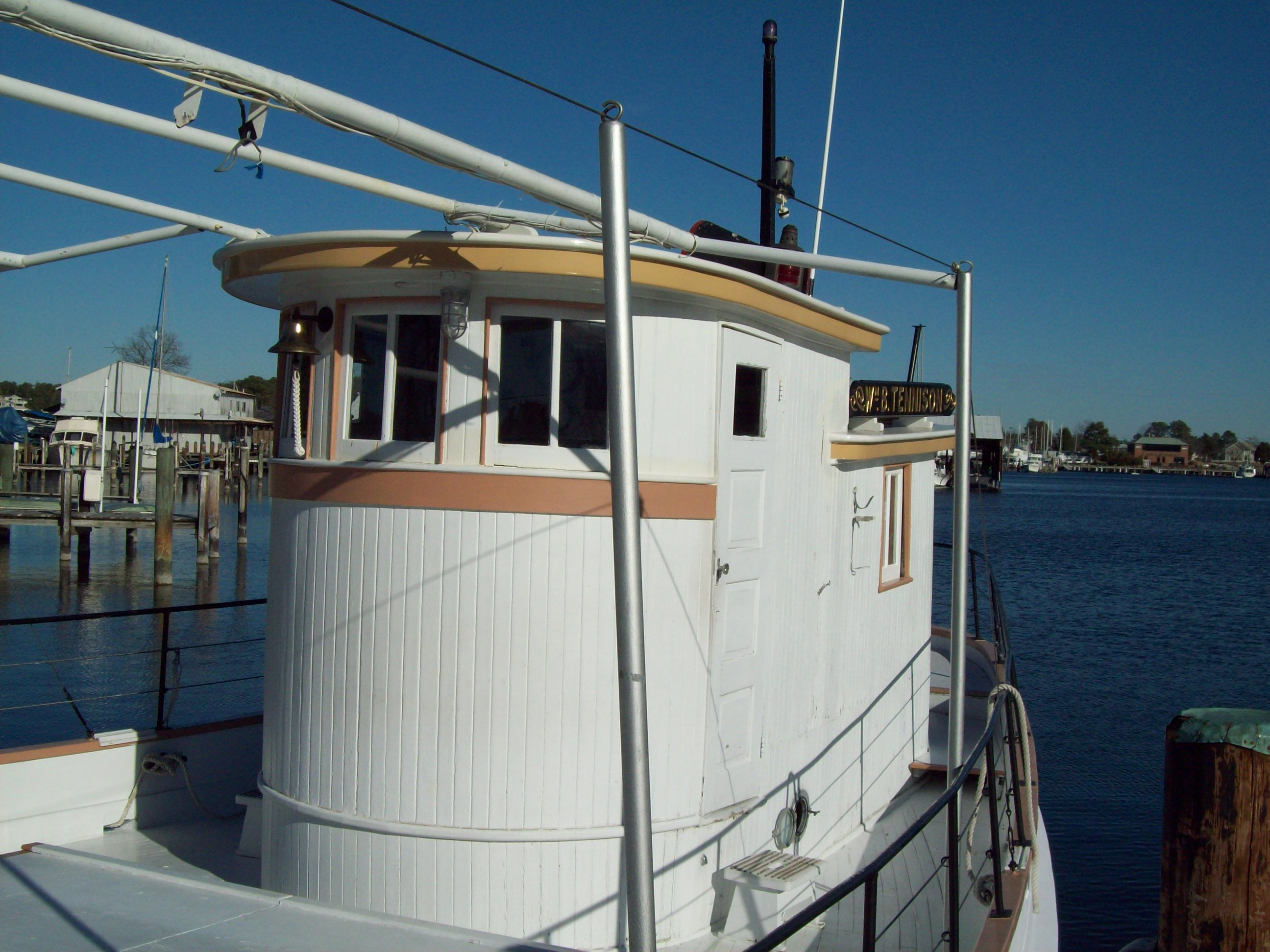
The rounded front of the deck house is a characteristic of an oyster buy-boat
