= Elijah W. Reed =

Elijah W. Reed (November 27, 1827 – January 27, 1888) was a ship captain from Brooklin, Maine, who is credited with establishment of the menhaden fishing industry in Virginia's Northern Neck region.

In 1874, Captain Reed moved his business to Northumberland County, Virginia, along the western shore of the Chesapeake Bay, an area where local watermen had been long established. He introduced a method of extracting large quantities of oil from the fish, by rendering millions of fish. Their oil was used as a lubricant and in lighting, as whale oil was; and the leftover bones and carcasses were valuable as fertilizer. Reed opened the first processing plant in the area. By 1885, Reedville was heavily engaged in the menhaden fishing industry. Menhaden factories on Cockrell Creek produced fish oil, meal, and fertilizer from menhaden. The menhaden fishing industry brought tremendous wealth to Reedville and to Northumberland County.

The unincorporated town of Reedville, Virginia, was named in his honor.
