= Oyster buy-boat =

Type of fishing boat

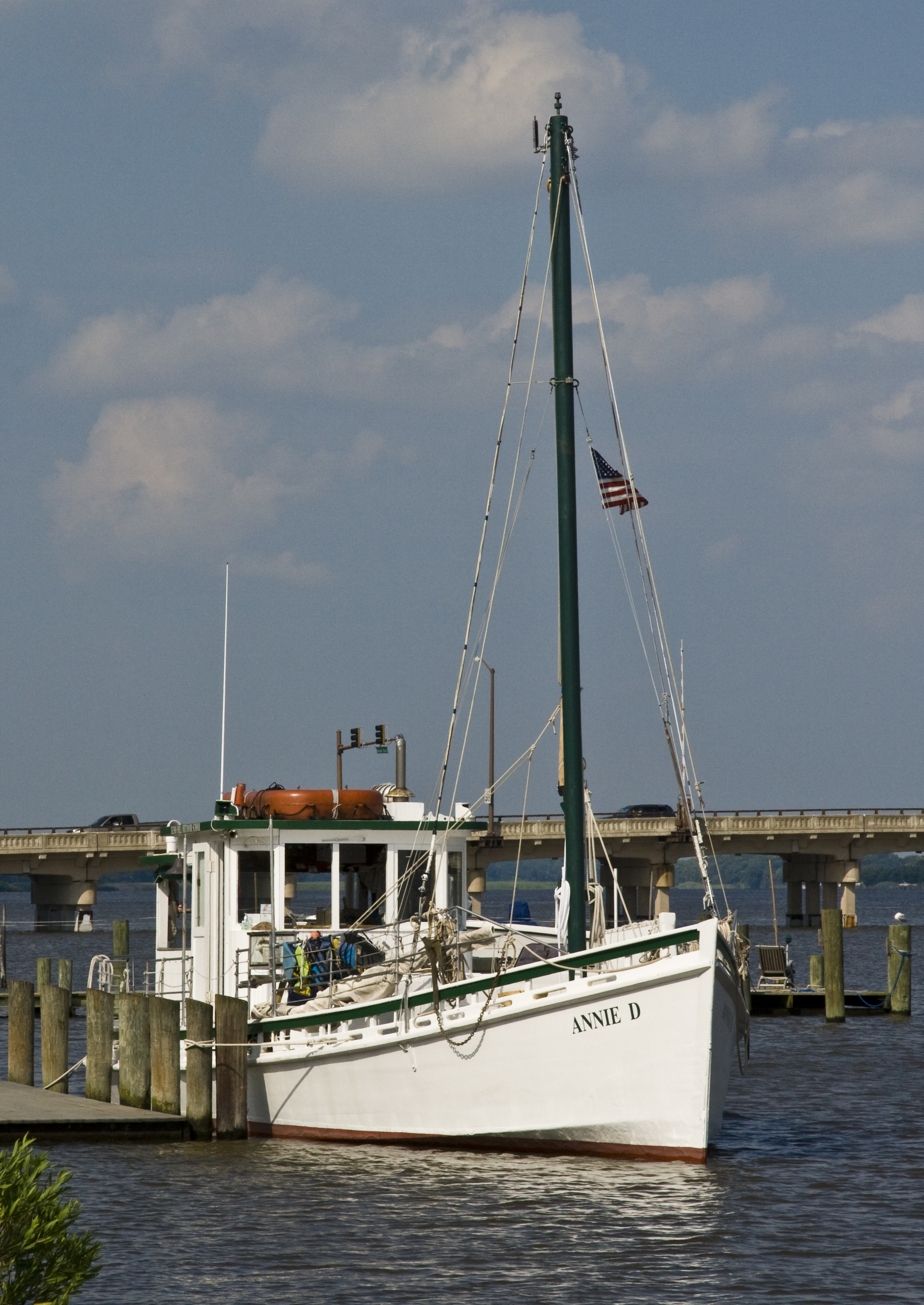
Buy-boat Annie D, owned by the Echo Hill Outdoor School

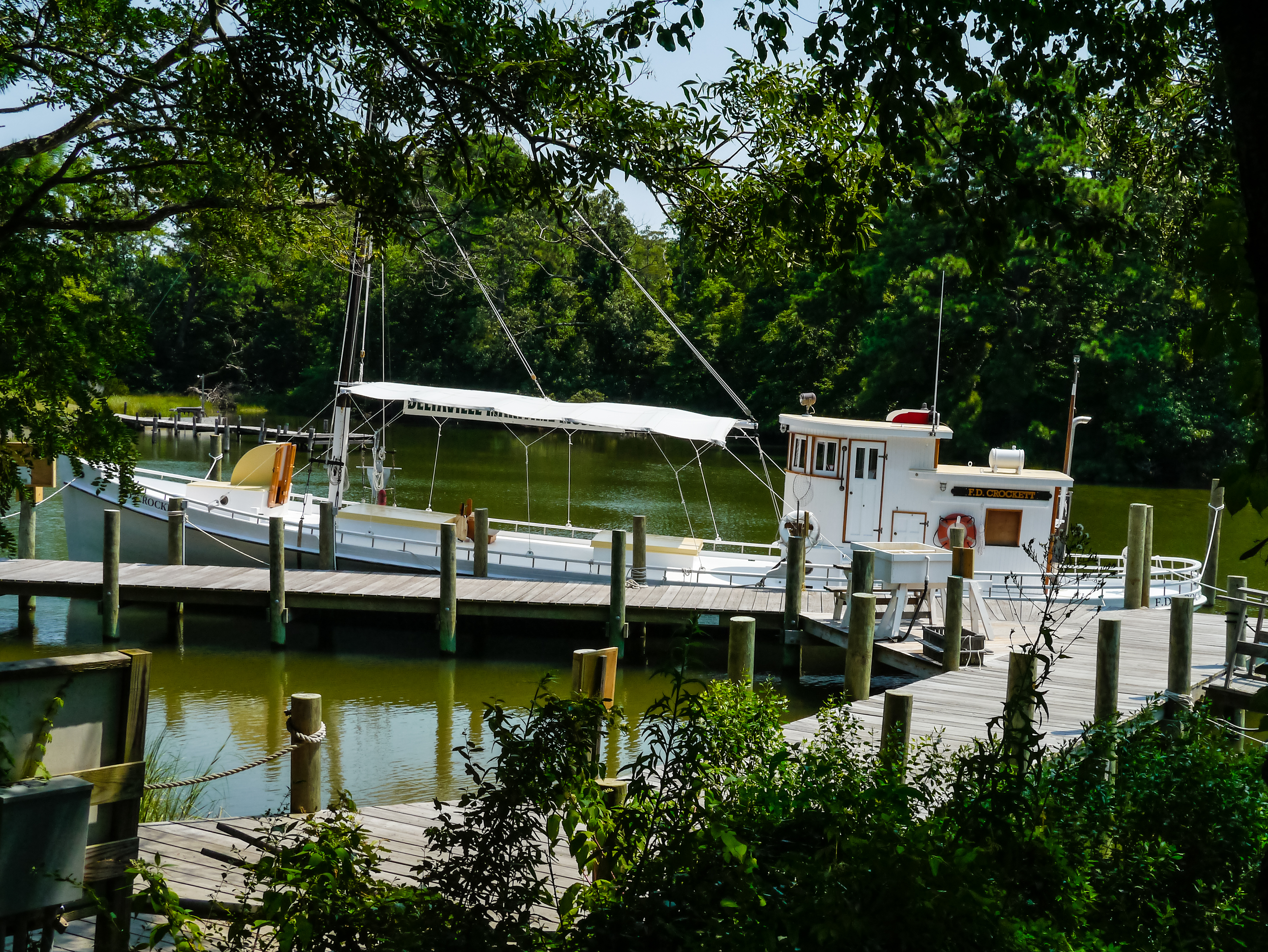
F.D. Crockett is a log-built Chesapeake Bay deck boat built in 1924

An oyster buy-boat, also known as deck boat, is an approximately 40–90 foot long wooden boat with a large open deck which serviced oyster tongers and dredgers. Similar in function to sardine carriers, buy boats circulated among the harvesters collecting their catches, then delivered their loads to a wholesaler or oyster processing house. This spared the fishermen the task and its downtime, allowing them to catch more oysters. Buy-boats also bought seed oysters, or spat, for planting in oyster beds.

== History ==
=== Rise ===
Some Chesapeake Bay buyboats such as the William B. Tennison began their lives as sailing vessels that were converted for power when internal combustion engines became available. Most buyboats, however, including those built for power, retained a single sail into the 1930s when engines became more powerful and reliable. Most Chesapeake Bay buyboats had plank-on-frame hulls like the Nellie Crockett, but a few were built as log canoes, such as the F.D. Crockett, a rare surviving example of this type. Buy-boats had a rear-mounted deck house over the engine that contained the wheel house that typically had a rounded front with three to five windows, a galley, a head, and bunks for the crew. Some boats also had additional bunks up in the fore-peak for crew members.

Buy-boats saw their heyday in the first half of the 20th century when most oysters from the Chesapeake Bay were harvested by tongers in small flat bottomed row boats (who used long tongs to pull oysters from the bottom), or dredged by sail powered skipjacks. Interstate highways, bridges and tunnels such as the Chesapeake Bay Bridge, Chesapeake Bay Bridge Tunnel, the Hampton Roads Bridge-Tunnel, and smaller bridges that span the many tributaries of the Chesapeake Bay were non-existent prior to the 1950s, therefore it was much faster to haul seafood to market by boat than by truck. Many buyboat captains also used their vessels to transport freight such as fresh produce, grain, livestock, and lumber to market during the off-season from May to August when they were not buying oysters.

=== During World War II ===
At the start of World War II German U-boats were wreaking havoc in the shipping lanes just off the Virginia Capes. Desperate to stop these losses, and lacking enough vessels to patrol the coast, the US government commissioned a number of Chesapeake Bay buy-boats for wartime service as patrol vessels to hunt for U-boats just offshore. These patrol boats were lightly armed with machine guns and were usually manned by their former owners and crew who were mustered into the service to operate them for the government.

One of these boats blew up while docked at Cape Charles killing some of its crew. The explosion was believed by many locals to have been the work of German saboteurs, possibly put ashore by a passing U-boat, who were believed to be in the area but this was never proven.

When the war ended, the boats were returned to their former owners.

=== Decline of the oyster industry ===
Only a few buyboats were built after World War II. This was due to vast improvements to transportation infrastructure in the region during the 1950s when most water-borne commerce moved to highways, and the rapid decline of the Chesapeake Bay oyster industry due to decades of over-harvesting and oyster diseases Haplosporidium nelsoni (MSX) and dermo that decimated the bay's oyster population. By the mid-1980s buyboats had all but vanished from the Chesapeake Bay. Today most oysters harvested from the Chesapeake are hybrid triploids raised in cages in aquaculture operations. Most dredgers who still harvest native oysters bring their catch directly to the docks themselves and seafood is hauled to distant markets in refrigerated trucks.

=== Buyboats in the 21st century ===
By 2013 only one buyboat, the Delvin K, operating out of remote Tangier Island, Virginia, was still buying oysters on the Chesapeake Bay, but many of these sturdy but largely obsolete wooden vessels remain afloat. Some were used to dredge crabs into the 1980s, but have since been replaced by smaller Chesapeake Bay deadrise workboats in this role. A few of them were adapted for use in the Chesapeake Bay Menhaden fishery during the 1970s and 80s but have since been retired, and some were used to haul seed oysters to replenish oyster reefs in Virginia and Maryland into the early 2000s. The few boats of this type that are still being operated as commercial fishing vessels in the 21st century are mainly used in the Chesapeake Bay pound net, fishery.

Most of the vessels of this type that are still afloat have found completely new lives as museum pieces, yachts, floating classrooms, and dive charter boats, a few in places far from the Chesapeake Bay such as the Florida Keys, the Bahamas, and Belize. Nearly forty are listed by the Chesapeake Bay Buyboat Association, broken into Northern, Southern, and Far South fleets overseen by a pair of vice commodores. There are annual gatherings in Chesapeake Bay communities such as Urbanna, Virginia, and St. Michaels, Maryland, of restored or partially restored boats currently in use as floating museums and private pleasure craft. Among those expected in Urbanna in 2006 were the Ellen Marie, Muriel Eileen, Nellie Crockett, P.E. Pruitt, Elva C., Ella K., Delvin K., Estelle Leonard, Thomas J, Bessie L., and the F.D. Crockett. Thomas J visited Oriental, North Carolina, with the Nellie Crockett in October 2013.
