= Northumberland County, Virginia =

County in Virginia, United States

- County
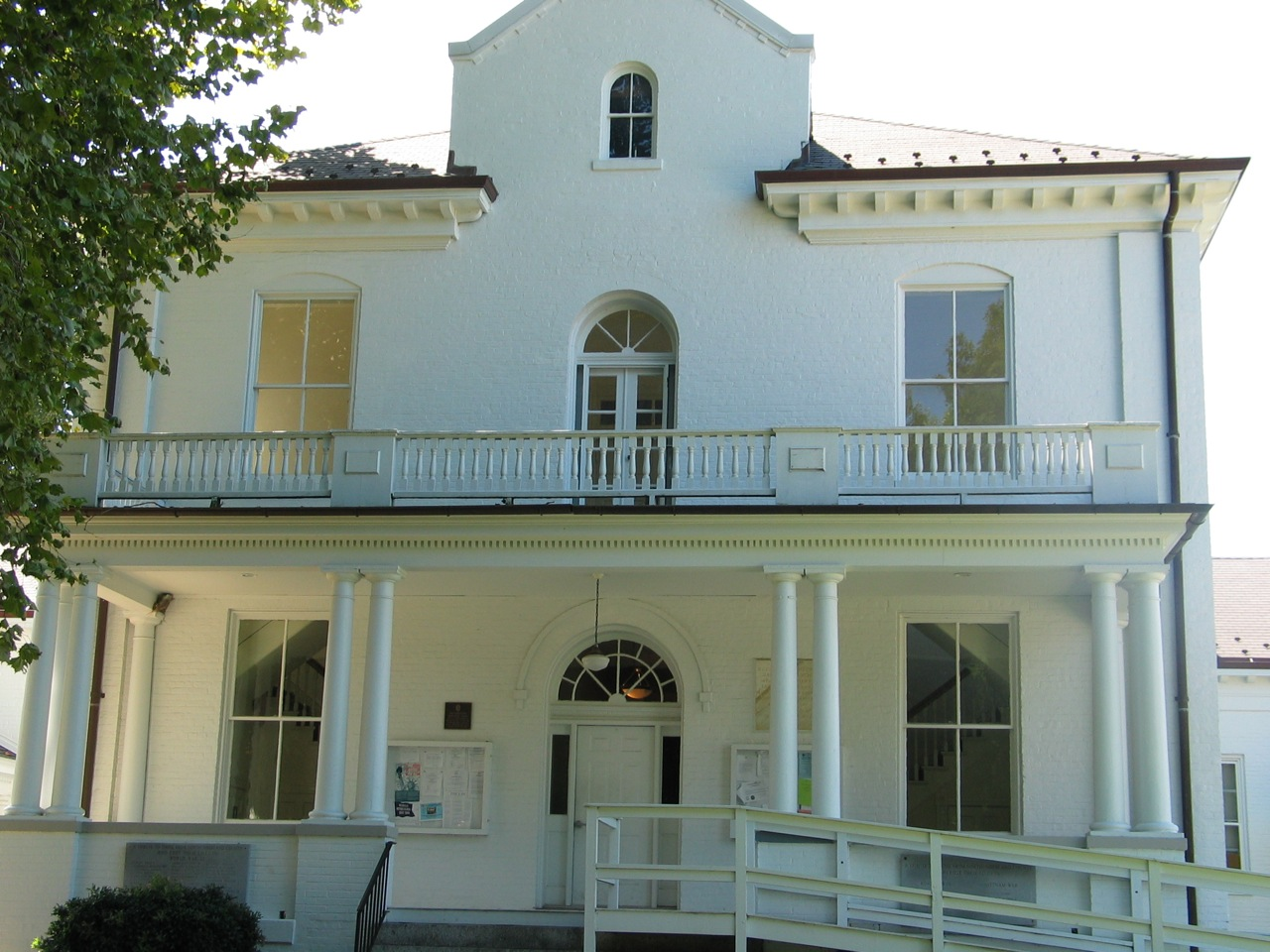
- Northumberland County Courthouse in Heathsville

- Seal

- Location within the U.S. state of Virginia
- Coordinates: 37°52′N 76°23′W
- Country: United States
- State: Virginia
- Founded: 1648
- Named for: Northumberland
- Seat: Heathsville
- Largest community: Heathsville

Area
  - Total: 286 sq mi (740 km^{2})
  - Land: 191 sq mi (490 km^{2})
  - Water: 94 sq mi (240 km^{2}) 33.0%

Population (2020)
  - Total: 11,839
  - Estimate (2025): 12,557 ▲
  - Density: 62.0/sq mi (23.9/km^{2})
- Time zone: UTC−5 (Eastern)
  - Summer (DST): UTC−4 (EDT)
- Congressional district: 1st
- Website: www.co.northumberland.va.us

Northumberland County is a county located in the Commonwealth of Virginia. At the 2020 census, the population was 11,839. Its county seat is Heathsville. The county is located on the Northern Neck and is part of the Northern Neck George Washington Birthplace AVA winemaking appellation.

== History ==
The area was occupied at the time of English settlement by the Algonquian-speaking historic tribes of the Wicocomico, Chickacoan, and Patawomeck. The county was created by the Virginia General Assembly in 1648 during a period of rapid population growth and geographic expansion. Settlement began in this area of the Northern Neck around 1635. Originally, known as the Indian district Chickacoan, the area was first referred to as Northumberland (a namesake of Northumberland County, England) in the colonial records in 1644. The following year, John Mottrom served as the first burgess for the territory in the House of Burgesses, which met at the capital of the Virginia Colony at Jamestown. The county was formed from a part of York County. The land between the Potomac River and the York River was formed into Northumberland County officially in 1648, prior to the creation of Westmoreland County and Lancaster County.

The colonial court ordered the Wicocomico and Chickacoan tribes to merge and by 1655, assigned them a reservation of 4,400 acres (18 km^{2}) near Dividing Creek, south of the Great Wicomico River. The Patawomeck Tribe was hunted nearly to extinction in 1666, and survived only by intermarriage. By the early 1700s, the Wicocomico tribe was greatly reduced, and English colonists took control of their lands. They were believed to be extinct as a tribe as, landless, they disappeared from the historical record. Descendants of the last weroance are working to regain recognition as a tribe, the Wicocomico Indian Nation. Descendants of the Patawomeck achieved tribal recognition from the state of Virginia in February 2010. The size of the county was drastically reduced in 1651 and 1653 when the colonial government organized Lancaster and Westmoreland counties from it.

Of the 172 counties that have ever existed in Virginia's history, Northumberland ended up being an "ancestor" to 116 of these—more than the current 95 counties (several were lost to other states, such as West Virginia).

== Geography ==
According to the U.S. Census Bureau, the county has a total area of 286 square miles (740 km^{2}), of which 191 square miles (490 km^{2}) is land and 94 square miles (240 km^{2}) (33.0%) is water. The county is located between the Rappahannock River to the south and Potomac River to the north. The Chesapeake Bay is immediately east of the county.

=== Adjacent counties ===
- Lancaster County – south
- Richmond County – west
- Westmoreland County – northwest
- St. Mary's County, Maryland – north (not contiguous)

== Demographics ==
Historical population
Census	Pop.	Note	%±
1790	9,163		—
1800	7,803		−14.8%
1810	8,308		6.5%
1820	8,016		−3.5%
1830	7,953		−0.8%
1840	7,924		−0.4%
1850	7,346		−7.3%
1860	7,531		2.5%
1870	6,863		−8.9%
1880	7,929		15.5%
1890	7,885		−0.6%
1900	9,486		20.3%
1910	10,777		13.6%
1920	11,518		6.9%
1930	11,081		−3.8%
1940	10,463		−5.6%
1950	10,012		−4.3%
1960	10,185		1.7%
1970	9,239		−9.3%
1980	9,828		6.4%
1990	10,524		7.1%
2000	12,259		16.5%
2010	12,330		0.6%
2020	11,839		−4.0%
2025 (est.)	12,557	▲	6.1%
U.S. Decennial Census; 1790-1960 1900-1990; 1990-2000 2010 2020

=== Racial and ethnic composition ===
Northumberland County, Virginia – Racial and ethnic composition Note: the US Census treats Hispanic/Latino as an ethnic category. This table excludes Latinos from the racial categories and assigns them to a separate category. Hispanics/Latinos may be of any race.
Race / Ethnicity (NH = Non-Hispanic)	Pop 1980	Pop 1990	Pop 2000	Pop 2010	Pop 2020	% 1980	% 1990	% 2000	% 2010	% 2020
White alone (NH)	6,481	7,361	8,804	8,638	8,310	65.94%	69.94%	71.82%	70.06%	70.19%
Black or African American alone (NH)	3,214	3,082	3,234	3,106	2,673	32.70%	29.29%	26.38%	25.19%	22.58%
Native American or Alaska Native alone (NH)	6	9	17	20	14	0.06%	0.09%	0.14%	0.16%	0.12%
Asian alone (NH)	6	19	24	36	67	0.06%	0.18%	0.20%	0.29%	0.57%
Native Hawaiian or Pacific Islander alone (NH)	x	x	0	2	0	x	x	0.00%	0.02%	0.00%
Other race alone (NH)	2	2	8	7	59	0.02%	0.02%	0.07%	0.06%	0.50%
Mixed race or Multiracial (NH)	x	x	58	139	365	x	x	0.47%	1.13%	3.08%
Hispanic or Latino (any race)	119	51	114	382	351	1.21%	0.48%	0.93%	3.10%	2.96%
Total	9,828	10,524	12,259	12,330	11,839	100.00%	100.00%	100.00%	100.00%	100.00%

=== 2020 census ===
As of the 2020 census, the county had a population of 11,839. The median age was 58.7 years. 14.6% of residents were under the age of 18 and 37.6% of residents were 65 years of age or older. For every 100 females there were 95.9 males, and for every 100 females age 18 and over there were 93.0 males age 18 and over.

The racial makeup of the county was 70.7% White, 22.7% Black or African American, 0.2% American Indian and Alaska Native, 0.6% Asian, 0.0% Native Hawaiian and Pacific Islander, 1.6% from some other race, and 4.1% from two or more races. Hispanic or Latino residents of any race comprised 3.0% of the population.

0.0% of residents lived in urban areas, while 100.0% lived in rural areas.

There were 5,573 households in the county, of which 16.8% had children under the age of 18 living with them and 26.1% had a female householder with no spouse or partner present. About 31.2% of all households were made up of individuals and 19.5% had someone living alone who was 65 years of age or older.

There were 8,947 housing units, of which 37.7% were vacant. Among occupied housing units, 84.4% were owner-occupied and 15.6% were renter-occupied. The homeowner vacancy rate was 3.4% and the rental vacancy rate was 11.7%.

=== 2000 Census ===
As of the census of 2000, there were 12,259 people, 5,470 households, and 3,785 families residing in the county. The population density was 64 people per square mile (25 people/km^{2}). There were 8,057 housing units at an average density of 42 units per square mile (16 units/km^{2}). The racial makeup of the county was 72.18% White, 26.58% Black or African American, 0.15% Native American, 0.20% Asian, 0.33% from other races, and 0.56% from two or more races. 0.93% of the population were Hispanic or Latino of any race.

There were 5,470 households, out of which 20.11% had children under the age of 18 living with them, 57.30% were married couples living together, 8.70% had a female householder with no husband present, and 30.80% were non-families. 27.70% of all households were made up of individuals, and 15.20% had someone living alone who was 65 years of age or older. The average household size was 2.24 and the average family size was 2.70.

In the county, the population was spread out, with 18.60% under the age of 18, 4.80% from 18 to 24, 20.20% from 25 to 44, 30.10% from 45 to 64, and 26.20% who were 65 years of age or older. The median age was 50 years. For every 100 females, there were 91.20 males. For every 100 females aged 18 and over, there were 88.40 males.

The median income for a household in the county was $38,129, and the median income for a family was $49,047. Males had a median income of $30,151 versus $24,116 for females. The per capita income for the county was $22,917. 12.30% of the population and 8.10% of families were below the poverty line. Out of the total people living in poverty, 17.00% are under the age of 18 and 10.70% are 65 or older.

== Government ==
Supervisors of Northumberland county are:

- James W. Brann (District 1, chairman)
- Keith Harris (District 2)
- James M. Long (District 3)
- A.C. Fisher Jr. (District 4)
- Charles H. "Chip" Williams, IV (District 5, vice-chairman)

The County Administrator is E. Luttrell Tadlock.

=== Emergency Services ===
There is no police department in the county. Instead, law enforcement is the responsibility of the county Sheriff, a commonwealth constitutional officer elected every four years, with support from the Virginia State Police. The Northumberland County Sheriff's Office is located in Heathsville. The current Sheriff is John A. “Johnny” Beauchamp.

Northumberland County has two courthouses: an antebellum building and a new building constructed in the late 1990s behind the older structure. The county courts (Circuit Court, General District Court, and Juvenile and Domestic Relations District Court), along with the Clerk of the Circuit Court and the Commonwealth's Attorney, both commonwealth constitutional officers, are located in the new building. The Commissioner of Revenue and the County Treasurer, both commonwealth constitutional officers, have offices in the older building.

The county is served by two fire departments, Callao Volunteer Fire Department in Callao and Fairfields Volunteer Fire Department with buildings in Reedville and Burgess (on Glebe Point). There are four rescue squads that serve the county: Northumberland Emergency Services, Callao Volunteer Rescue Squad in Callao, Mid-County Volunteer Rescue Squad in Heathsville, and Northumberland County Rescue Squad in Reedville and Burgess. Smith Point Sea Rescue performs water, largely boat, rescues in the mid-Chesapeake Bay area, including Northumberland County.

== Education ==
Northumberland County Public Schools instructs about 1,200 students in the county. Northumberland Middle and High School share the same building and campus. Elementary students have their own dedicated building. The Superintendent is Karen Leslie, PhD.

== Politics ==
United States presidential election results for Northumberland County, Virginia
Year	Republican		Democratic		Third party(ies)	
Year	No.	%	No.	%	No.	%
1912	102	16.35%	470	75.32%	52	8.33%
1916	111	17.99%	503	81.52%	3	0.49%
1920	221	28.96%	536	70.25%	6	0.79%
1924	130	17.83%	589	80.80%	10	1.37%
1928	744	72.23%	286	27.77%	0	0.00%
1932	245	27.71%	630	71.27%	9	1.02%
1936	260	29.61%	618	70.39%	0	0.00%
1940	386	35.03%	712	64.61%	4	0.36%
1944	525	43.00%	695	56.92%	1	0.08%
1948	535	46.68%	429	37.43%	182	15.88%
1952	1,230	68.11%	573	31.73%	3	0.17%
1956	1,191	62.68%	428	22.53%	281	14.79%
1960	1,340	60.61%	858	38.81%	13	0.59%
1964	1,423	58.85%	988	40.86%	7	0.29%
1968	1,438	41.18%	1,077	30.84%	977	27.98%
1972	2,332	71.58%	884	27.13%	42	1.29%
1976	2,167	52.52%	1,814	43.97%	145	3.51%
1980	2,598	60.00%	1,551	35.82%	181	4.18%
1984	3,166	68.41%	1,407	30.40%	55	1.19%
1988	2,984	65.14%	1,506	32.87%	91	1.99%
1992	2,667	50.00%	1,862	34.91%	805	15.09%
1996	2,605	51.81%	1,957	38.92%	466	9.27%
2000	3,362	59.98%	2,118	37.79%	125	2.23%
2004	3,832	59.79%	2,548	39.76%	29	0.45%
2008	4,041	54.56%	3,312	44.72%	53	0.72%
2012	4,310	57.03%	3,191	42.22%	57	0.75%
2016	4,302	58.15%	2,852	38.55%	244	3.30%
2020	4,485	57.39%	3,252	41.61%	78	1.00%
2024	4,938	59.99%	3,202	38.90%	92	1.12%

== Reedville, menhaden fishing industry ==
Reedville is a small village in eastern Northumberland County on the western shore of the Chesapeake Bay. Reedville is home to the Atlantic menhaden fishing industry. It is named for Captain Elijah W. Reed (1827–1888), who is credited with bringing the menhaden fishing industry, and the tremendous wealth that resulted from it, to Reedville—and to Northumberland County in general.

Dozens of fish-processing factories, most recently Omega Protein Corporation (successor to Zapata Haynie, Reedville Oil and Guano Company and Haynie Products Company) and Standard Products Company, have dotted the Northumberland coastline near Reedville and adjacent fishing communities.

Today, Omega Protein remains the largest industrial organization in the area. Omega, with a fleet of large oceangoing fish-harvesting vessels, supported by a number of spotter aircraft, is a major industry in the area and on the Eastern seaboard. Menhaden, once caught, are cooked in large mass and processed for further use in various applications, including as a protein additive for poultry feed.

Located at the eastern terminus of U.S. Route 360, Reedville is a popular place to begin fishing charters and trips to Tangier Island in the Bay. Reedville is also a tourist destination itself, steeped in the history of the menhaden fishing industry. The Millionaire's Row of Victorian Era mansions and several watercraft of the Reedville Fishermen's Museum are listed on the National Register of Historic Places.

== Communities ==
=== Town ===
- Kilmarnock in Lancaster County extends into southeastern Northumberland County.

=== Census-designated place ===
- Heathsville

=== Other unincorporated communities ===
- Avalon
- Beverlyville
- Browns Store
- Bryant Corner
- Burgess
- Callao
- Coan
- Cowart
- Fairport
- Fleeton
- Lake
- Lottsburg
- Reedville
- Wicomico Church

== Notable people ==
- Zak Kent, Major League Baseball player

== See also ==
- National Register of Historic Places listings in Northumberland County, Virginia
