= National Register of Historic Places listings in Richmond County, Virginia =

Location of Richmond County in Virginia

This is a list of the National Register of Historic Places listings in Richmond County, Virginia.

This is intended to be a complete list of the properties and districts on the National Register of Historic Places in Richmond County, Virginia, United States. The locations of National Register properties and districts for which the latitude and longitude coordinates are included below, may be seen in an online map.

There are 10 properties and districts listed on the National Register in the county, including 3 National Historic Landmarks. Another property was once listed but has been removed.

This National Park Service list is complete through NPS recent listings posted August 14, 2026.

== Current listings ==
	Name on the Register	Image	Date listed	Location	City or town	Description
1	Chinn House		November 8, 2021 (#100007134)	5554 Richmond Rd. 37°57′31″N 76°45′46″W	Warsaw	
2	Farnham Church	Farnham Church	August 14, 1973 (#73002053)	State Route 3; 37°53′09″N 76°37′31″W	Farnham	
3	Grove Mount	Grove Mount	January 3, 1991 (#90001995)	Junction of Newland and Grove Mount Rds. 38°00′42″N 76°49′58″W	Warsaw	
4	Indian Banks	Indian Banks	March 20, 1980 (#80004218)	Simonson Rd. 37°48′35″N 76°37′55″W	Simonson	
5	Linden Farm	Linden Farm	April 13, 1977 (#77001492)	North of Farnham on State Route 3; 37°53′25″N 76°37′59″W	Farnham	
6	Menokin	Menokin	October 1, 1969 (#69000276)	Northwest of the junction of Menokin and Chestnut Hill Rds. 38°00′30″N 76°48′13″W	Warsaw	
7	Mount Airy	Mount Airy	October 15, 1966 (#66000845)	West of Warsaw on U.S. Route 360; 37°58′15″N 76°47′28″W	Warsaw	
8	Richmond County Courthouse	Richmond County Courthouse	December 5, 1972 (#72001413)	Junction of U.S. Route 360 and State Route 3; 37°57′29″N 76°45′27″W	Warsaw	
9	Sabine Hall	Sabine Hall	November 12, 1969 (#69000277)	South of the junction of U.S. Route 360 and Sabine Hall Rd. 37°56′24″N 76°47′05″W	Tappahannock	
10	Woodford	Woodford	February 24, 1983 (#83003311)	Ivondale Rd. 37°49′59″N 76°40′15″W	Simons Corner	

== Former listing ==
	Name on the Register	Image	Date listed	Date removed	Location	City or town	Description
1	Bladensfield		October 31, 1980 (#80004219)	March 19, 2001	NE of Warsaw off VA 203	Warsaw	Destroyed by fire November 1996

== See also ==
- List of National Historic Landmarks in Virginia
- National Register of Historic Places listings in Virginia
