= Joseph Chinn =

American politician

Joseph W. Chinn

Member of the U.S. House of Representatives from Virginia
- In office March 4, 1831 – March 3, 1835
- Preceded by: John Taliaferro (13th); William F. Gordon (10th)
- Succeeded by: John M. Patton (13th); John Taliaferro (10th)
- Constituency: 13th district (1831-33); 10th district (1833–35)

Member of the Virginia House of Delegates from Lancaster County
- In office December 4, 1826 – November 20, 1828 Serving with Addison Hall, John Meredith
- Preceded by: William Gilmour
- Succeeded by: Charles Leland

Member of the Virginia Senate from Lancaster, King George, Westmoreland, Northumberland, Richmond, Stafford and Prince William Counties
- In office December 7, 1829 – 1832
- Preceded by: St. Leger L. Carter
- Succeeded by: William Basye

Personal details
- Born: November 16, 1798 Nuttsville, Virginia, US
- Died: December 5, 1840 (aged 42) Wilna plantation, near Warsaw, Virginia, US
- Party: Democratic
- Spouse: Marianne Smith
- Relatives: Joseph W. Chinn (grandson)
- Profession: lawyer, politician

Joseph William Chinn (November 16, 1798 – December 5, 1840) was a Virginia lawyer, plantation owner and politician who served in both houses of the Virginia General Assembly and in the United States House of Representatives.

== Early and family life ==
Born at "Epping Forest" near Nuttsville, Virginia, the home of his maternal grandfather Col. Joseph Ball (also a maternal grandfather to George Washington). His father, also Joseph Chinn, had married Elizabeth Griffin, one of Col. Ball's daughters, and represented Lancaster County in the Virginia House of Delegates alongside Henry Towles from 1792 until 1794, when he was elected to the Virginia Senate to represent the Northern Neck counties of Lancaster, Richmond and Northumberland. His paternal grandfather, yet another Joseph Chinn, had served in Virginia's House of Burgesses, representing Lancaster County from 1748 until 1750 (like Col. Ball's grandfather of the same name), when he won election as Lancaster County's coroner and later served as its sheriff.

This Joseph Chinn received a private education locally, then traveled to Schenectady, New York, to continue his education, graduating from Union College in 1819. Upon returning to Virginia, Chinn studied law at the newly opened proprietary Needham Law School run by Judge Creed Taylor in Needham, Virginia.

He married Mary Ann Smith, daughter of Charles Smith of Morattico Hall, who bore a son, also Joseph William Chinn (1836–1908), who inherited the plantation and fought for the Confederacy during the American Civil War, then became a lawyer and fathered Virginia Supreme Court justice Joseph W. Chinn (1866–1936).

== Career ==
Admitted to the Virginia bar in 1821, this Joseph W. Chinn began his legal practice on Virginia's Northern Neck. He also owned land and eventually farmed using enslaved labor. In 1820, his plantation near Stafford, Virginia, included 10 persons and no slaves. In 1830, his family in Lancaster County, Virginia included four white persons and 13 slaves.

Chinn continued his families' political tradition. Lancaster County voters first elected him to the Virginia House of Delegates in 1826 and re-elected him once. Lancaster County voters also joined others from northern Virginia to elect Chinn to the Virginia Senate, where he served from 1829 until 1831, when he resigned because he had been elected to the United States House of Representatives.

A Jacksonian Democrat, Chinn defeated anti-Jacksonian congressman John Taliaferro in 1830 and representing Virginia's 13th congressional district. He won re-election despite being to redistricted Virginia's 10th congressional district. However, in 1834, Chinn lost his second re-election bid to Taliaferro (who would later win re-election as a Whig). During his second term, Chinn was chairman of the Committee on the District of Columbia (1833 to 1835). Afterwards, he moved to Richmond County, Virginia, where he resumed practicing law and operating his plantation.

== Death and legacy ==
Chinn died at his estate called "Wilna" near Farnham, Virginia, on December 5, 1840. His widow and young son Joseph Chinn moved to Tappahannock, Essex County, Virginia, where they lived with the family of merchant Robert Hopkins. By 1860 the boy had reached legal age, claimed his inheritance and married, living with his wife Gabriella in Richmond County. He would leave the University of Virginia in July 1861, enlist as a private in the 40th Virginia Infantry and become the regimental sergeant major in 1862 before transferring to the 9th Virginia Cavalry. He survived the American Civil War and received a presidential pardon after only mentioning his clerical service on September 9, 1865. Eventually, his son (this Joseph W. Chinn's grandson), yet another Joseph William Chinn continued the family's legal tradition and later became a justice of the Virginia Supreme Court. The family's Richmond County home, Wilna, remains a private home. The Chinn family left Wilna in 1890 to relocate to Sunnyside Plantation in nearby Warsaw.

Although several generations of this Chinn family achieved political office, descendants continued prominent on the Northern Neck, and this Joseph Chinn for a time represented Prince William County (and adjoining areas), the historical marker in Prince William County near Minnieville and Old Bridge Roads, as well as the 98-acre Chinn Regional Park, Chinn Regional Library and Chinn Aquatic Center remember the legacy of an early and distinguished African-American family descended from the 19th century emancipated slaves Thomas Chinn and his wife Nancy (who bought 500 acres between Telegraph and Davis Ford Roads at the end of the American Civil War), and their daughter Mary Jane Chinn (1827–1907), who became the family's matriarch.

U.S. House of Representatives
Preceded by John Taliaferro	Member of the U.S. House of Representatives from Virginia's 13th congressional district March 4, 1831 – March 4, 1833 (obsolete district)	Succeeded by John M. Patton
Preceded by William F. Gordon	Member of the U.S. House of Representatives from Virginia's 10th congressional district March 4, 1833 – March 4, 1835	Succeeded by John Taliaferro
