= Samuel Travers =

Member of the Virginia House of Burgesses representing Richmond County
- In office 1696-97 Serving with Alexander Newman
- Preceded by: Arthur Spicer
- Succeeded by: William Colston

Personal details
- Born: circa 1664 Old Rappahannock County, Colony of Virginia
- Died: 1698 Richmond County, Colony of Virginia
- Resting place: North Farnham Episcopal Church, Richmond County, Virginia
- Spouse: Frances Allerton
- Relations: William Travers (father), Raleigh Travers (uncle)
- Children: 3 daughters
- Occupation: planter, politician

Military service
- Branch/service: Virginia militia
- Rank: Captain

Samuel Travers (c. 1664 – 1679) was an early settler and politician of Colonial Virginia. He served the county as a justice of the peace, sheriff, and burgess.

== Early life ==
This son of Rebecca Hussey (1643-1702), whose father Giles Hussey (1614-1668) was an "ancient planter" in the developing area, was born on what became known as the Northern Neck of Virginia. His father William Travers emigrated to the Virginia Colony during the tobacco boom of the 1640s and the English Civil War, as colonists displaced Native Americans north of the Rappahannock River. This boy's uncle Raleigh Travers may have been the paternal family's first emigrant to Virginia, and represented Lancaster County on Virginia's developing Northern Neck for nearly two decades (circa 1651 until 1670). This boy's father served as Speaker of the House of Burgesses in 1677, at the end of Bacon's Rebellion, but died before September 11, 1678, when his widow (this boy's mother) was appointed executor of the estate. He had two brothers, William Jr. and Rawleigh Travers II, but accounts differ as to whether he or William Jr. was the eldest. This boy and his brothers were underage when his father died, and his mother remarried, to merchant John Rice, who defended the estate against the claims of a Dublin merchant.

== Career ==
Upon reaching legal age in 1685, Travers gained control of the land he had inherited (possibly by primogeniture). A legal case concerned whether John Rice should have paid quitrents to the Northern Neck Proprietary (granted vast acreage in 1649 by King Charles II in exile and desultorily enforced until his return to the English throne in 1660 and through the Anglo-Dutch Wars), or whether they were Samuel's responsibility. In any event, Samuel Travers became a justice of the peace in what later became known as Old Rappahannock County, and two years later was captain in its militia (participation in which was required of all white males). He became the county's sheriff in 1689, but refused to take the oath of Crown allegiance and supremacy. Nonetheless, in 1692 Travers became deputy escheator (of estates of traitors or with no known heirs). The following year, Travers re-patented some of the land he had inherited from his father or brother William Jr., then deeded it to his younger brother Raleigh Travers II, who soon sold it.

In 1696, three years after their county's creation by Virginia's legislature with the governor's consent, Richmond County voters refused to re-elect veteran legislators Arthur Spicer and William Tayloe to represent them part-time in the House of Burgesses, but instead elected this man and Alexander Newman, then the next year again replaced both those burgesses, this time replacing them with William Colston and Thomas Lloyd.

== Personal life ==
Travers married Frances Allerton (1668-1702), daughter of Col. Isaac Allerton, who had borne three daughters of this marriage by the time Allerton died, and who may have borne two more daughters before Samuel's death. Their daughter Rebecca (1692-1726) married Capt. Charles Colston (1691-1724)(William Colston was a burgess who began representing Old Rappahanock County in 1691). Her sisters Elizabeth (1689-1721) and Winifred (1694-1749), were also mentioned in Issac Allerton's will as, and both also married, Elizabeth first to Thomas Harwar and after his death to John Tarpley who survived her, and Winifred to Daniel Hornby who died in 1650. However, not all believe that Mary Traverse (before 1700-after 1740) who married Thomas Jeffries (or Geffreys) was their sister; and sister Frances (b. 1697) may have died as an infant.

== Death and legacy ==
Travers died in 1698, and his widow four years later. Both are buried in the North Farnham Episcopal Church in Richmond County At least one man of the same name (1815-1892) was prominent in Taylor's Island in Dorchester County, Maryland, freed at least some slaves in 1855 and may have served in the Maryland legislature, but because this man only had daughters, he cannot be a direct descendant.
