= Richmond County Public Schools =

School district in Virginia

Coordinates: 37°56′52″N 76°44′55″W

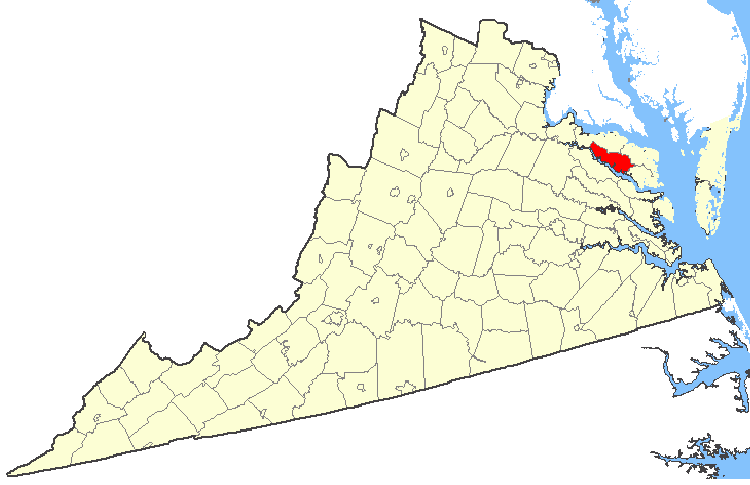
- Map showing Richmond County, Virginia

Address
- 92 Walnut Street Warsaw, Richmond County, Virginia, 22572; United States

District information
- Type: Public
- Grades: Pre-K through 12
- Established: c. 1930
- Superintendent: Bernard S. "Trey" Davis III
- School board: five members
- Chair of the board: Boyd K. Blackley
- Governing agency: Virginia Department of Education
- Schools: 3
- NCES District ID: 5103270

Students and staff
- Students: 1306
- Student–teacher ratio: 15:1

Other information
- Website: www.richmond-county.k12.va.us

Richmond County Public Schools (RCPS), the K–12 public school district in Richmond County, Virginia, serves about 1300 total students. It operates three schools: Richmond County Elementary-Middle school, Rappahannock High School, and Mackey-Thompson Learning Center.

== Facilities ==
The district of Richmond County Public Schools serves a rural area located on the Northern Neck peninsula of eastern Virginia, north of the Rappahannock River. Until 2015, RCPS had operated one elementary school, one intermediate school, and one high school. In 2013, the RCPS Board of Education planned construction projects to allow elimination of the intermediate school.

A construction grant of $6,085,500 from the state's Qualified Zone Construction Bond was secured to plan "additional structures to the elementary and high schools to accommodate Grades 6-8 as well as new sports facilities for varsity and junior varsity teams". Bids were let in July 2013, and a $14.4 million contract was awarded to Southwood Builders. Construction included "new wings ...a 600-seat auditorium with a music room and 1,000-seat gymnasium".

By the 2015 school year, Richmond County Public Schools began operating two reconfigured schools and a learning center:

- Rappahannock High School (grades 8–12)
- Richmond County Elementary-Middle School (grades K–7)
- Mackey-Thompson Learning Center

The Mackey-Thompson Learning Center houses the Virginia Preschool Initiative for 4-year olds, the Gifted & Talented program, and the Academic Recovery Program for remediation and credit recovery. The Center, originally built in 1938 as Richmond County High School, is named for two African-American educators, William H. Mackey and Augustella Yates Thompson, who were "community leaders in the pursuit of educational opportunities for African-American youth of that time".

== Accreditation and academics ==
According to the Virginia Department of Education School Quality Profiles, "Annual accreditation is waived for all Virginia public schools for the 2021-2022 school year due to the continuing impact of the COVID-19 pandemic on schools and students." Richmond County Public Schools had been fully accredited in 2017, results consistent with the RCPS district's 2014–2015 report card on statewide benchmarks. In addition, Niche awarded the district an overall ranking of A− in academics in 2017. Niche's 2022 website ranked the district as B− (above average) overall, based on student-teacher ratio of 16 to 1 and state test scores showing 86% of students proficient in math and 77% in reading.

The Virginia Mathematics and Science Coalition recognized RCPS for its collaborative program with Friends of the Rappahannock, "A River Runs Through Us", a systemic "Meaningful Watershed Education Experience" as its "2016 Program That Works". All sixth grade students investigate, 'How do our daily actions impact the health of the Rappahannock River?' "

Richmond County Public Schools invested in a remote learning "1-to-1 program" in 2020 so "every child in the eighth through 12th grade has a laptop at home". That investment in technology also included provision of mobile hotspots for internet access to students without it.

A much earlier (1976–1978) curricular innovation focused on K–12 arts education, "implemented through art, music, and drama classes, and demonstrations of the Virginia Museum Traveling Exhibition". Researcher Sally Schumacher reported after the 3rd year of the program, "Since 1978, more students participated in the art and music curriculum, with opportunities for instruction in drama and musical productions. Administrators and teachers felt that the arts program increased student awareness and appreciation of the arts, creativity, and self-esteem."

== Funding ==
County residents raised a funding issue in March 2013 over whether "border students", who live outside the Richmond County borders, should be charged tuition to attend school in the county. At the end of March, the Non-Resident Student Committee recommended the district "continue to accept border students without making them pay tuition". A mailer sent to county residents claimed these students "were attending RCPS at a hefty cost to taxpayers", but school funding in Virginia is based on student attendance, a composite index, and required local contributions.

"But on June 18, the school board held a public hearing where a vast majority of citizens in attendance opposed tuition for nonresident students. Their reasons included tradition — nonresident students have been attending Richmond County schools for 83 years without having to pay a dime, they argued — and additional revenue."

The superintendent calculated non-resident students had generated $291,193 of the county's $6,708,570 in state funding, and the loss of the approximately 60 non-resident students could result in the loss of two faculty. Even though the school board "proposed that families of non-resident students pay a fee of $588", the majority of citizens at the June meeting opposed that tuition recommendation. The school board voted to accept an application process and an attendance policy, not including a tuition fee, for non-resident students. The following year, enrollment of non-resident students rose from 57 to approximately 110 students, resulting in additional state revenues to RCPS of $276,638.

In 2018, the district began providing free breakfasts and lunches to all students, funded by a United States Department of Agriculture program called "Community Eligibility Provision", a meal service option for low-income school districts. The federal government reimburses the district for the free meals.

That program has been followed in 2020 by Supplemental Nutrition Assistance Program (SNAP) benefits amounting to $376 annually to each child served by RCPS.

== Administration ==
=== Superintendent ===
Superintendent of Richmond County Public Schools Bernard S. "Trey" Davis III began as superintendent on February 1, 2021.

=== School Board ===
There are five members of the Richmond County Public School board.

- District 1: Vivian G. Wood, Vice Chairman
- District 2: Frank Johnson
- District 3: Patricia P. Pugh
- District 4: Kathleen F. Beane
- District 5: Boyd K. Blackley, Chairman
