= Joseph W. Chinn =

American judge

Judge Joseph W. Chinn

Commonwealth's Attorney of Richmond County
- In office 1891–1915

Judge of Virginia's 12th Judicial Circuit
- In office 1915–1924

Judge of Virginia's Special Court of Appeals
- In office 1924–1927

Justice Virginia Supreme Court

Member of the U.S. House of Representatives from 's 10th district
- In office December 3, 1931 – August 16, 1936
- Preceded by: Robert R. Prentis
- Succeeded by: Claude V. Spratley

Personal details
- Born: February 13, 1866 Tappahannock, Essex County, Virginia
- Died: August 16, 1936 (aged 70) Battle Creek, Michigan
- Resting place: St. John's Episcopal Church, Warsaw, Richmond County, Virginia
- Party: Democratic
- Spouse: Sarah Fairfax Douglas
- Relatives: Joseph Chinn (grandfather)
- Profession: lawyer, judge

Joseph W. Chinn (February 13, 1866 – August 16, 1936) was a Virginia lawyer and judge.

== Early and family life ==
He was born at the Brockenbrough House in Tappahannock, Virginia to Confederate veteran and lawyer Joseph William Chinn and his wife, the former Gabriella Brockenbrough. His grandfather and great-grandfather had both served in both houses of the Virginia General Assembly and his paternal grandfather Joseph Chinn was twice elected to the U.S. Congress, but this Joseph Chinn only continued his family's lawyerly tradition. Judge Chinn was raised at his family home, Wilna, in Richmond County, Virginia south of Warsaw, Virginia. He attended Colonel Council’s School in King and Queen County, Virginia and, after teaching for several years in Louisiana and South Carolina, decided to study law. He entered the University of Virginia Law School and after legal studies in 1889 and 1890, was admitted to the bar in 1890.

== Career ==
Like many in his family, Chinn began a private legal practice, initially near home in Warsaw. However, after one year, he won election as Commonwealth’s Attorney for Richmond County, then continued to win re-election and so served as the county's prosecutor for twenty-four years.

Chinn resigned in 1915 to accept the position of judge of the Twelfth Judicial Circuit of Virginia. The Special Court of Appeals was formed in 1924 and, in 1925, Judge Chinn became a member of that court. He remained on that court until it was dissolved three years later. He also served as Commissioner of Fisheries in 1930–1931.

Governor John Garland Pollard appointed Judge Chinn to the remainder of the term of Justice Robert R. Prentis, so on December 3, 1931, he joined the Supreme Court of Appeals of Virginia. The Virginia General Assembly elected him to a full 12-year term on February 2, 1934, but he died in office.

A lifelong Democrat, Chinn also served for many years on the vestry of St. John's Episcopal Church in Warsaw, where he served would be buried. He also served on the board of directors of the first bank in Warsaw, the Mumford Bank, and on the board of the Northern Neck Telephone and Telegraph. Chinn was also the first president and a director of the Northern Neck State Bank in Warsaw, and served as school superintendent for Richmond County, as well as on the board of directors at University of Virginia.

== Personal life ==
Judge Chinn married Sarah Fairfax Douglas at St. John's Episcopal Church in Warsaw on December 14, 1899. They had five children, Betty Landon (April 22, 1903), Joseph William (June 4, 1904), Sarah Fairfax (September 30, 1905), Austin Brockenbrough (May 8, 1908) and Mary Douglas (October 1, 1910).

== Death and legacy ==
Judge Chinn died in Battle Creek, Michigan, where he had gone for treatment for his emphysema, on August 16, 1936. He is buried in Warsaw in the churchyard of St. John's Episcopal Church.
