= Richmond County Courthouse =

Richmond County Courthouse may refer to:

- Old Government House (Augusta, Georgia), also known as the Old Richmond County Courthouse
- Richmond County Courthouse (Staten Island), New York
  - Third County Courthouse (Staten Island), the previous courthouse on Staten Island
- Richmond County Courthouse (North Carolina), Rockingham, North Carolina
- Richmond County Courthouse (Virginia), Warsaw, Virginia
