= Rappahannock High School =

Secondary school in Virginia, US

Coordinates: 37.9490°N 76.7434°W

Location
- 6914 Richmond Road; Warsaw, Richmond, Virginia 22572; United States

Information
- Established: c. 1930
- School district: Richmond County Public Schools
- NCES District ID: 5103270
- NCES School ID: 510327001409
- Principal: Brian Thrift
- Faculty: 37.49
- Secondary years taught: 8th through 12th grades
- Enrollment: 500 students
- Student to teacher ratio: 13.34
- Colors: Red and gray
- Team name: Raiders
- Website: https://rhs.richmond-county.k12.va.us/

Rappahannock High School (RHS) is a secondary school serving pupils in grades 8–12 of the Richmond County Public Schools in Warsaw, Virginia, on the Northern Neck peninsula.

== Facilities ==
In 2013, the Richmond County Public Schools district planned to eliminate the district's intermediate school by combining grades six and seven with the elementary school, and grades 8–12 in the high school. A new facility was constructed for grades eleven and twelve, while the existing high school building accommodated grades eight through ten. The new construction was described in 2015 as a "90,000 square foot addition to Rappahannock High School". The addition included larger classrooms, a 600 seat auditorium, and a new gymnasium.

The auditorium has been named in honor of Richmond County's retiring superintendent, "Dr. James G. Smith Auditorium".

== Academics ==
In 2013 Virginia public schools had higher than national average SAT scores in critical reading, mathematics, and writing, but schools in the Northern Neck all had scores lower than both the state and national average scores. Rappahannock High School had the closest to average scores, and the highest scores in the Northern Neck.

Niche reported in 2022 that 85% of Rappahannock High School students scored as proficient on state tests in math, 82% are proficient in reading, and 19% of RHS student enroll in Advanced Placement courses.

U.S. News & World Report awarded RHS silver medals for its state rankings of 38th in 2014 and 39th in 2015. Factors considered in the rankings included reading and math proficiency on state Standards of Learning tests, college readiness and student/teacher ratios. RHS student proficiency in 2014 averaged 99% in reading and 74% in math, both higher than the Virginia average; 28% of seniors took Advanced Placement exams, with 22% of seniors passing.

=== Co-curricular activities ===
- Rappahannock's Leadership class was selected in 2015 to participate in Aéropostale's contest, "Teens for Jeans", to support giving used jeans to local homeless shelters. The class arranged for free admission to a basketball game to everyone who donated a pair of jeans, and they also arranged for a Spirit Week competition that had each class donate jeans for homemade baked goods and for points toward the "Spirit Stick" competition.
- In 2015, Rappahannock High School team finished in second place in the Conference 43 Scholastic Bowl Tournament, behind Rappahannock County High School (RHCS) for the second consecutive year. Both RHS and RHCS advanced to the Region 1A tournament.
- In a 2017 mock Shark Tank, students from an entrepreneur class, "StartUP Raider’s Program" answered judges' questions about their business proposals, pitching their ideas for funding. The winning proposal was for "Safe Ride (SR)", the only not-for-profit. Students were judged on "appearance, clarity, business soundness, and visual presentation".
- Old Dominion University's Tim Seibles, poet laureate of Virginia spoke in 2018 at Rappahannock High School, to students, parents, and community members, about his poetry, poetry from the Harlem Renaissance, and Black History Month.
- In 2019 the honor society Beta Club participated in "27 service projects... including packing 32,000 meals for Haiti, tutoring students at Richmond County Elementary Middle School, ringing the Salvation Army Bells, helping with the Healthy Running series, volunteering in Warsaw’s Santa Land, and staffing the rides at WarsawFest".

== Athletics ==
In 2022, athletes in three RHS sports won regional championships, in soccer, baseball, and softball. The Raiders soccer team won their third Region 1A title in a row and their fourth in five seasons. The baseball team beat rival Lancaster in the final game to secure the title. In softball, the 2022 Lady Raiders beat the Chincoteague Lady Ponies team in eight innings to become regional champs.

The RHS Lady Raiders had previously won the state championship in 2014.

== Notable alumni ==
- Cal Bowdler – Irish American basketball player
