= Northern Neck Regional Jail =

Jail in Warsaw, Virginia, United States

Coordinates: 37°57′52″N 76°47′29″W

Northern Neck Regional Jail is a jail in Warsaw, Virginia, which is located in Virginia's Northern Neck. The jail was completed in 1995. It employs 100 people and has a capacity of 460 inmates with its most recent addition completed in 2000.

Notable inmates of the jail have included Chris Brown in 2014, Paul Manafort in 2018, Daniel Hale in 2021, and Michael Vick.
