= Tidewater, Richmond County, Virginia =

Unincorporated community in Virginia, US

Coordinates: 37°51′18″N 76°41′55″W

Tidewater is an unincorporated community in Richmond County, in the U.S. state of Virginia.

It is home to the Belmont Canning Factory, which produced canned goods such as vegetables, fruits, and seafood, and was a vital economic engine for the community in Richmond County.
