= Pomona, Virginia =

Unincorporated community in Virginia, US

Coordinates: 38.225847°N 77.027346°W

Pomona is an unincorporated community in Westmoreland County, in the Northern Neck of Virginia, United States. The area was likely named Pomona after the largest of the Orkney Islands by St. John Shropshire, a Scottish immigrant, who purchased the land in 1736. Another Scot, the Reverend Archibald Campbell (who tutored John Marshall and James Monroe as boys at his parish school) purchased the property in 1761, and a large Federal style house, also named Pomona, stands there today.
