= Totuskey, Virginia =

Unincorporated community in Virginia, US

Coordinates: 37°56′38″N 76°37′02″W

Totuskey is an unincorporated community in Richmond County, in the U.S. state of Virginia. The Totuskey Creek flows through the area.
