= Woodford (Simons Corner, Virginia) =

Historic house in Virginia, United States

- U.S. National Register of Historic Places
- Virginia Landmarks Register
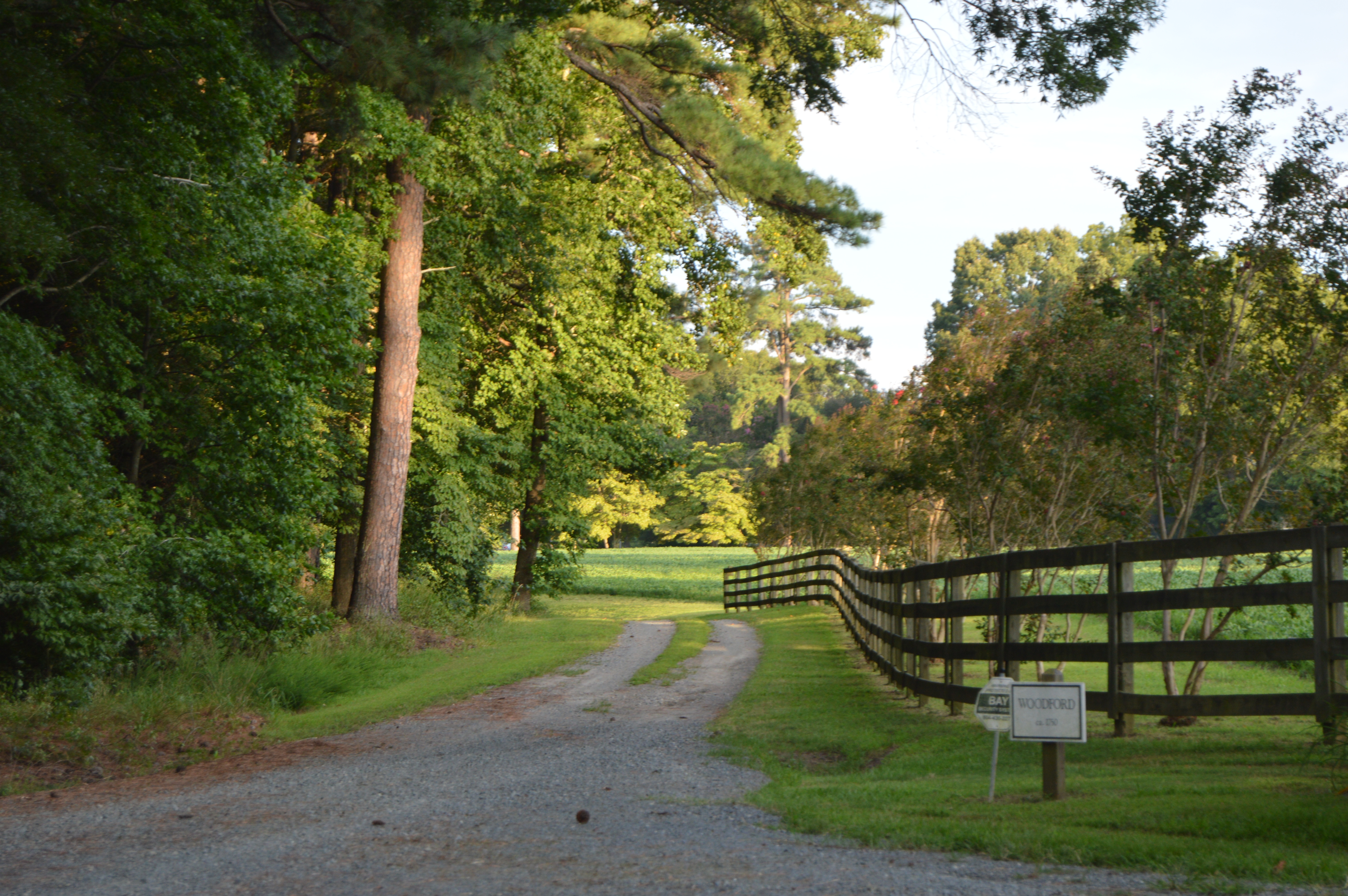
- Property entrance

- Location within Virginia Location within the United States
- Location: VA 610, Simons Corner, Virginia
- Coordinates: 37°49′56″N 76°40′19″W
- Area: 53 acres (21 ha)
- NRHP reference No.: 83003311
- VLR No.: 079-0020

Significant dates
- Added to NRHP: February 24, 1983
- Designated VLR: July 21, 1981

Woodford is a historic home located at Simons Corner, Richmond County, Virginia. It dates to the mid-18th century, and is a small 1 1/2-story, three-bay, vernacular brick dwelling. It features a clipped gable roof and exterior end chimneys. The house was restored in the 1930s. At that time, a 1 1/2-story frame wing and porch were added.

It was added to the National Register of Historic Places in 1983.
