= Newland, Virginia =

Unincorporated community in Virginia, US

Coordinates: 38°02′59″N 76°52′18″W

Newland is an unincorporated community in Richmond County, in the U.S. state of Virginia.

== Landmarks ==
There are two religious in Newland, the non-denominational Newland street Church of Christ and the Welcome Grove Baptist Church.
