= Rappahannock River Valley National Wildlife Refuge =

United States National Wildlife Refuge in Virginia

- IUCN category IV (habitat/species management area)
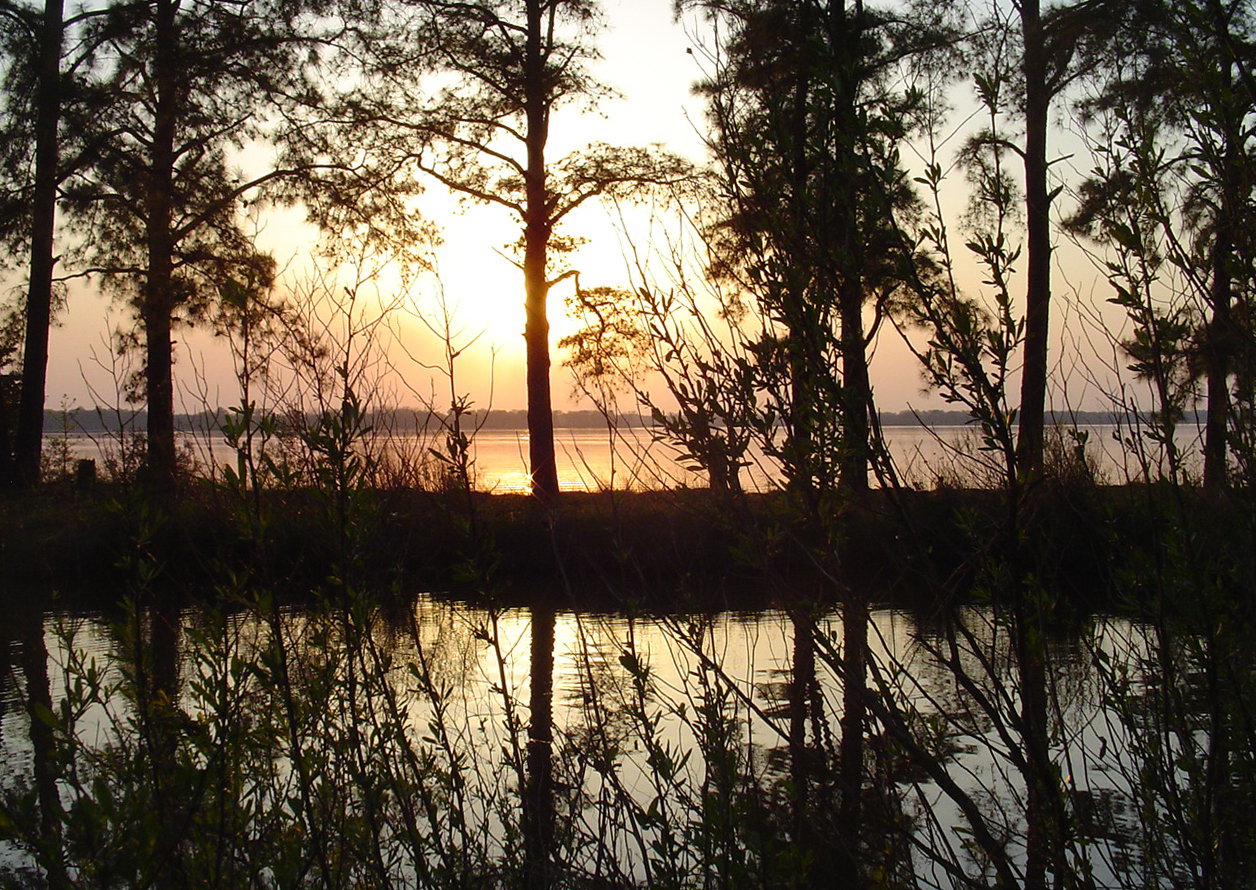

- Location within Virginia Location within the United States
- Location: Rappahannock River, Virginia, United States
- Nearest city: Warsaw, Virginia
- Coordinates: 38°00′00″N 76°53′00″W
- Area: 9,030 acres (36.5 km^{2})
- Established: 1996
- Governing body: U.S. Fish and Wildlife Service
- Website: Rappahannock River Valley National Wildlife Refuge

The Rappahannock River Valley National Wildlife Refuge is a National Wildlife Refuge in Warsaw, Virginia, United States that was established in 1996. It is managed by the United States Fish and Wildlife Service.

== Location ==
The refuge comprises several non-contiguous units along the Rappahannock River in King George, Caroline, Essex, Westmoreland, and Richmond counties. The majority of the units are in Richmond County.

Rappahannock River Valley is part of the Eastern Virginia Rivers National Wildlife Refuge Complex. The complex comprises four refuges:

- Rappahannock River Valley National Wildlife Refuge
- Presquile National Wildlife Refuge
- James River National Wildlife Refuge
- Plum Tree Island National Wildlife Refuge

== Purpose ==
This refuge was created as a haven to protect fish and wildlife, wetlands and especially threatened and endangered species. In particular the goal of the refuge is to protect the wetlands and streams of the Rappahannock River watershed. The Fish and Wildlife service is also making restoration efforts for the flora and fauna as well as the wetland ecosystem as a whole.
