= Simonson, Virginia =

Unincorporated community in Virginia, US

Coordinates: 37°48′24″N 76°38′01″W

Simonson is an unincorporated community in Richmond County, in the U.S. state of Virginia.

Indian Banks was added to the National Register of Historic Places in 1980.
