= Daniel Hale =

Former US National Security Agency analyst (born 1987)

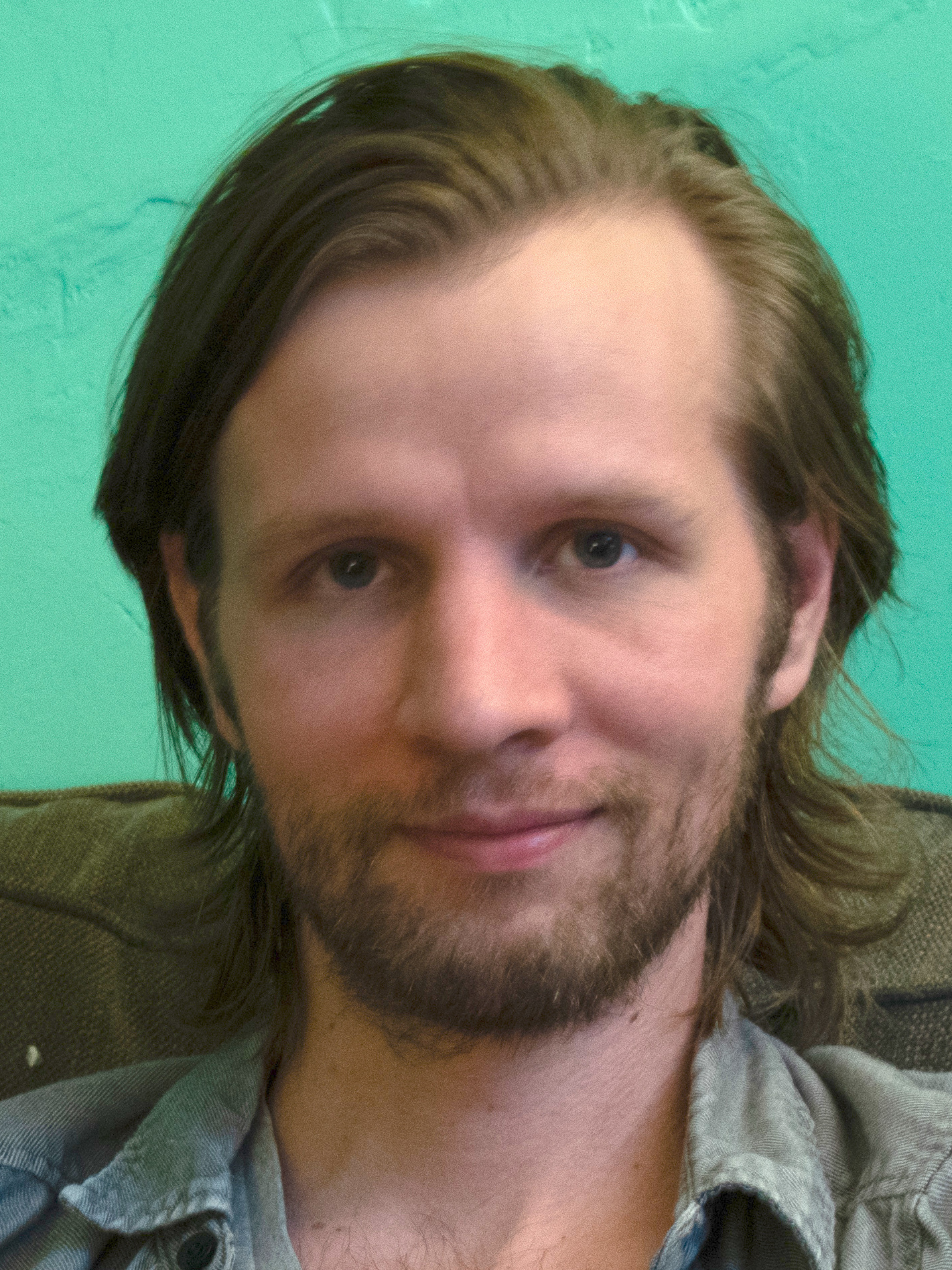
- Hale in 2020
- Born: August 1, 1987
- Awards: Sam Adams Award (2021)

Daniel Everette Hale (born August 1, 1987) is an American whistleblower and former National Security Agency (NSA) intelligence analyst who sent classified information about drone warfare to the press. Hale served in the United States Air Force 2009–2013 before joining the National Security Agency and leaking classified documents to The Intercept. In 2021, he pled guilty to retaining and transmitting national defense information and was sentenced to 45 months in prison. He was incarcerated at United States Penitentiary, Marion, Illinois. He was released on July 5, 2024.

== Government service ==
Hale served in the United States Air Force from July 2009 to July 2013. He was an enlisted airman. In 2013, he was assigned to the NSA and the Joint Special Operations Command at Bagram Airfield, the largest U.S. military base in Afghanistan, where he helped identify targets for assassination.

== Leaks to The Intercept ==
In February 2014, after leaving the Air Force and becoming a contractor at the National Geospatial-Intelligence Agency, Hale leaked 17 classified documents to The Intercept. The documents contained details about U.S. kill lists and civilian casualties of drone strikes, and in some cases revealed actions that, if proven, would amount to war crimes. Over one five-month period covered by the documents, nearly 90 percent of the people killed in U.S. drone strikes were not the intended targets. In an article published by Truthout, Marjorie Cohn wrote that "civilian bystanders were nonetheless classified as 'enemies killed in action' unless proven otherwise." The documents formed the basis of a series of articles, the Drone Papers, published by The Intercept in October 2015.

Hale also leaked unclassified guidelines for the US terror watch list. People whose names appeared in the US No Fly List were able to use the guidelines to request their removal from the list.

== Government investigation and prosecution ==
On August 8, 2014, the FBI raided his home in Lorton, Virginia, in what he described as retribution for his political activism. In 2016, he appeared in the documentary film National Bird, where he described his crisis of conscience and the FBI raid.

In 2019, Hale was charged with disclosing intelligence information and theft of government property. He was arraigned in the U.S. District Court for the Eastern District of Virginia. In March 2021, he pleaded guilty to retaining and transmitting national defense information. On July 27, 2021, citing the need to deter others from disclosing government secrets, U.S. District Judge Liam O'Grady sentenced Hale to 45 months in prison for violating the Espionage Act of 1917. "You are not being prosecuted for speaking out about the drone program killing innocent people", O'Grady told Hale. "You could have been a whistleblower ... without taking any of these documents." In court, Hale said he accepted punishment for taking the documents, and for taking innocent lives during his participation in the drone program. Noting that he is a descendant of Nathan Hale executed for spying on the British for the Continental Army during the American Revolutionary War, Hale paraphrased his ancestor's reported last words, saying, "I have but this one life to give in service of my country."

== Incarceration ==
Following sentencing, Hale was transferred from Alexandria City Jail to temporary confinement at Northern Neck Regional Jail in Virginia to await further disposition. U.S. Representative Ilhan Omar (D-MN) wrote to President Biden in August 2021, requesting a full pardon or commutation of sentence for Hale. In early October 2021, Hale was transferred to a communications management unit in the United States Penitentiary, Marion, Illinois.

== Awards ==
In August 2021 he received the Sam Adams Award for Integrity in Intelligence from a group of retired CIA officers, for "performing a vital public service at great personal cost—imprisonment for truth-telling".

The Australian charity Blueprint for Free Speech awarded Hale its international prize in December 2021. In its citation, the charity said Hale's actions "prompted greater openness from the Obama administration about their drone policy, and greater demands for ongoing accountability to the public".

In October 2024, Hale received the inaugural Ellsberg Whistleblower Award, named for Pentagon Papers whistleblower Daniel Ellsberg. Shortly before his passing, Ellsberg expressed his wish that Hale be the first recipient.

== Publications ==
- Hale, Daniel (as "Anonymous") (2016). "Why I Leaked the Watchlist Documents". In Scahill, Jeremy (ed.). The Assassination Complex: Inside the Government's Secret Drone Warfare Program. New York. ISBN 978-1-5011-4415-8.
