= Grove Mount =

Historic house in Virginia, United States

- U.S. National Register of Historic Places
- Virginia Landmarks Register
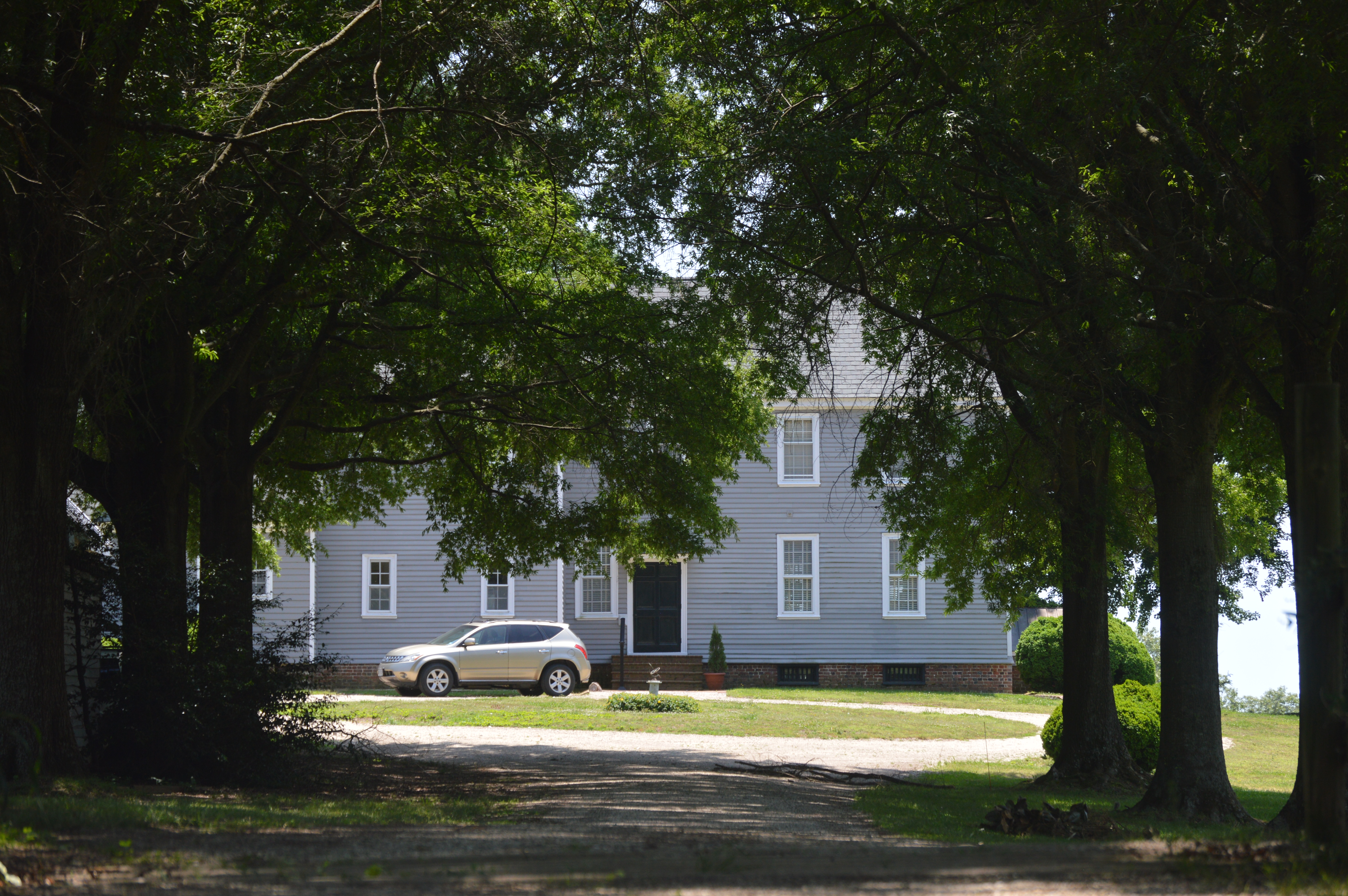
- Front of the house

- Location within Virginia Location within the United States
- Location: Jct. of VA 635 and VA 624, near Warsaw, Virginia
- Coordinates: 38°00′33″N 76°49′58″W
- Area: 101.6 acres (41.1 ha)
- Built: c. 1780-1800
- Architectural style: Georgian
- NRHP reference No.: 90001995
- VLR No.: 079-0005

Significant dates
- Added to NRHP: January 3, 1991
- Designated VLR: December 12, 1989

Grove Mount is a historic plantation house located near Warsaw in Richmond County, Virginia, United States. The main house was built about 1780–1800 by Robert Mitchell with the profits of forced labor; by 1808, he had enslaved 76 people. It is a large, two-story, five-bay Late Georgian-style frame dwelling. It has a hipped roof and interior end chimneys. A kitchen wing was added in 1952 and an orangery added in 1989. Also on the property are the contributing late-18th century dairy, a log corn crib, and a late-19th or early-20th century frame outbuilding. There is also the archeological site of the former kitchen and possibly other outbuildings adjacent to the old kitchen.

It was added to the National Register of Historic Places in 1977.
