= Cal Bowdler =

Irish-American basketball player

Personal information
- Born: March 31, 1977 (age 49) Sharps, Virginia, U.S.
- Listed height: 6 ft 10 in (2.08 m)
- Listed weight: 245 lb (111 kg)

Career information
- High school: Rappahannock (Warsaw, Virginia)
- College: Old Dominion (1995–1999)
- NBA draft: 1999: 1st round, 17th overall pick
- Drafted by: Atlanta Hawks
- Playing career: 1999–2005
- Position: Forward
- Number: 3, 6

Career history
- 1999–2002: Atlanta Hawks
- 2002: Kinder Bologna
- 2002–2003: Montepaschi Siena
- 2003–2004: Lottomatica Roma
- 2004–2005: Casti Group Varese

Career highlights
- First-team All-CAA (1999)
- Stats at NBA.com
- Stats at Basketball Reference

James Calloway "Cal" Bowdler II (born March 31, 1977) is an Irish American former professional basketball player. A 6 ft 10 in, 245 lb power forward from Old Dominion University, Bowdler was selected by the Atlanta Hawks in the 1st round (17th overall) of the 1999 NBA draft and played for the Hawks for three seasons from 1999 to 2002. He has last played professionally in Italy for Kinder Bologna (2002), Montepaschi Siena (2002–2003), Lottomatica Roma (2003–2004) and Casti Group Varese (2004–05).

Bowdler attended Rappahannock High School in Warsaw, Virginia.

Bowdler is the only player in the modern era of basketball to commit seven personal fouls during an NBA game. This happened because the scorekeeper did not realize seven fouls had been committed until after the game was over.

== Career statistics ==
Legend
GP	Games played	GS	Games started	MPG	Minutes per game
FG%	Field goal percentage	3P%	3-point field goal percentage	FT%	Free throw percentage
RPG	Rebounds per game	APG	Assists per game	SPG	Steals per game
BPG	Blocks per game	PPG	Points per game	**Bold**	Career high

=== NBA ===
Year	Team	GP	GS	MPG	FG%	3P%	FT%	RPG	APG	SPG	BPG	PPG
1999–00	Atlanta	46	0	9.2	.426	.000	.632	1.8	**0.3**	**0.3**	0.2	2.7
2000–01	Atlanta	44	0	8.5	**.465**	**.200**	.825	1.8	0.1	0.2	**0.5**	**3.2**
2001-02	Atlanta	**52**	0	**11.3**	.351	**.200**	**.830**	**2.1**	0.2	**0.3**	0.3	3.1
Career		142	0	9.7	.404	.182	.768	1.9	0.2	0.3	0.3	3.0

=== College ===
Year	Team	GP	GS	MPG	FG%	3P%	FT%	RPG	APG	SPG	BPG	PPG
1995–96	Old Dominion	23	-	8.9	.340	.308	.692	1.7	0.6	0.1	0.5	2.1
1996–97	Old Dominion	33	11	19.0	.433	**.318**	.488	4.9	0.3	0.3	1.3	5.5
1997–98	Old Dominion	28	-	29.6	.421	.179	.556	8.8	0.5	**0.5**	2.4	10.2
1998–99	Old Dominion	**34**	**34**	**30.0**	**.492**	.257	**.731**	**10.0**	**1.3**	**0.5**	**2.9**	**14.7**
Career		118	45	22.7	.451	.264	.625	6.6	0.7	0.4	1.9	8.6
