= Farnham Church =

Historic church in Virginia, US

- U.S. National Register of Historic Places
- Virginia Landmarks Register
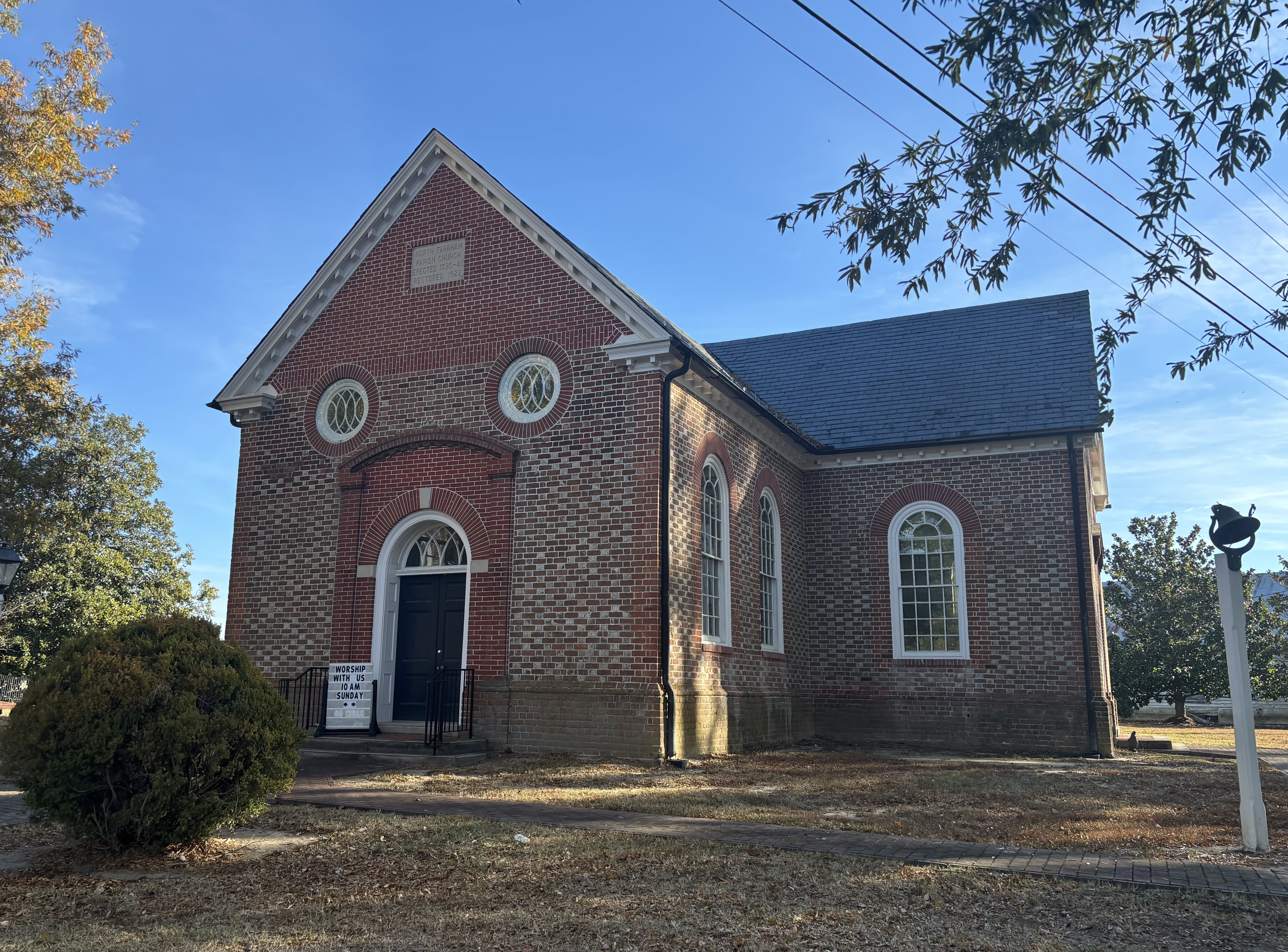
- Farnham Church in 2025

- Location within Virginia Location within the United States
- Location: VA 3, Farnham, Virginia
- Coordinates: 37°53′9″N 76°37′32″W
- Area: 9.9 acres (4.0 ha)
- Built: 1737
- Architectural style: Georgian Revival, Colonial
- NRHP reference No.: 73002053
- VLR No.: 079-0014

Significant dates
- Added to NRHP: August 14, 1973
- Designated VLR: September 19, 1972

Farnham Church, also known as North Farnham Episcopal Church, is a historic Episcopal church located in Farnham, Richmond County, Virginia. It is the parish church of North Farnham Parish, created in 1683.

The church was built in 1737 in the Colonial style, and renovated in 1921 in the Georgian Revival style. As it stands, the church is a one story, cruciform-shaped brick building with a gable roof. The interior includes a barrel-vaulted ceiling and a Georgian-style pulpit and altarpiece. Due to the church being abandoned and gutted multiple times, the brick walls are the only surviving aspect of the original 1737 building. The dimensions are 63.8 ft. by 58.2 ft.

Farnham Church was added to the National Register of Historic Places in 1973.

== History ==
The church was first built in 1737 as a replacement for an older church built around 1660. The original building likely had a hipped roof. Early parishioners included the Carter family of Sabine Hall and the Tayloe family of Mount Airy.

The building was left abandoned in the late-18th century after the disestablishment caused churches associated with the Church of England to fall out of favor; during this time it may have been used as a barn and distillery. Two years into the War of 1812, bullet holes were left in the walls during a conflict between the Virginia militia and the British fleet led by Admiral George Cockburn. This event was called the Skirmish at Farnham Church, and it was an American victory. The church used as a stable by Union soldiers during the Civil War. It was later restored to service in 1873, but a fire gutted the building in 1887. The church was last renovated in 1921.

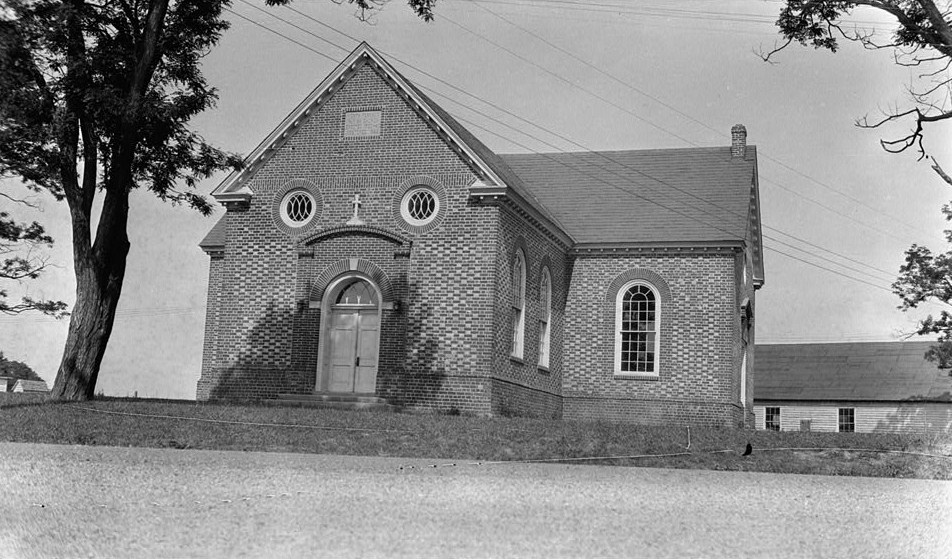
HABS photo of Farnham Church
