= Linden Farm =

18th century American farm and historic landmark

- U.S. National Register of Historic Places
- Virginia Landmarks Register
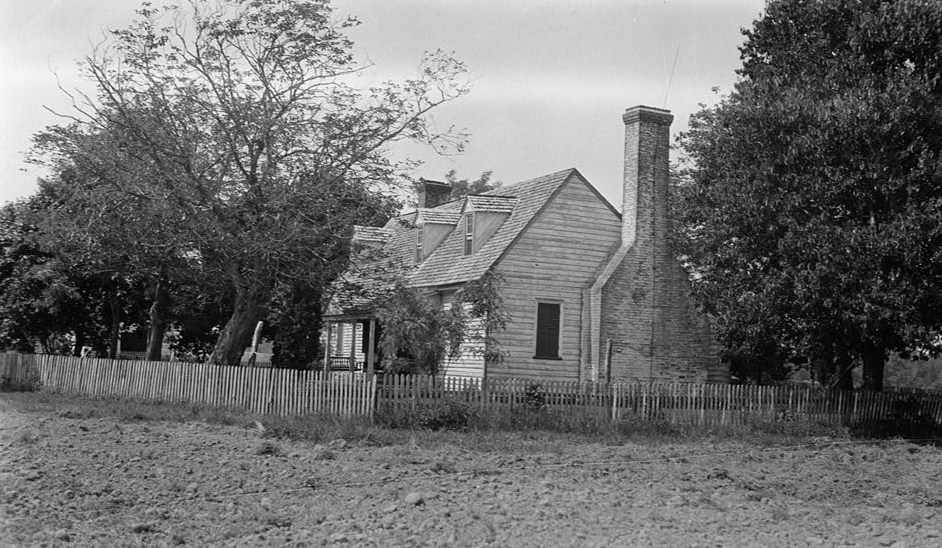
- Linden Farm, HABS Photo

- Location within Virginia Location within the United States
- Location: N of Farnham on VA 3, near Farnham, Virginia
- Coordinates: 37°53′28″N 76°38′01″W
- Area: 28.2 acres (11.4 ha)
- Built: c. 1700-1725
- Built by: Dew, Andrew
- Architectural style: Colonial, Vernacular
- NRHP reference No.: 77001492
- VLR No.: 079-0010

Significant dates
- Added to NRHP: April 13, 1977
- Designated VLR: September 21, 1976

Linden Farm, also known as Linden and Dew House, is a historic home located near Farnham, Richmond County, Virginia. It was built in two stages between about 1700 and 1725, and is a small 1 1/2-story Colonial era frame vernacular dwelling. It is clad with beaded weatherboards and has an asymmetrical gable roof. The house features tall, asymmetrical, pyramidal brick chimneys.

It was added to the National Register of Historic Places in 1977.
