= Indian Banks (Simonson, Virginia) =

Historic house in Virginia, United States

- U.S. National Register of Historic Places
- U.S. Historic district
- Virginia Landmarks Register
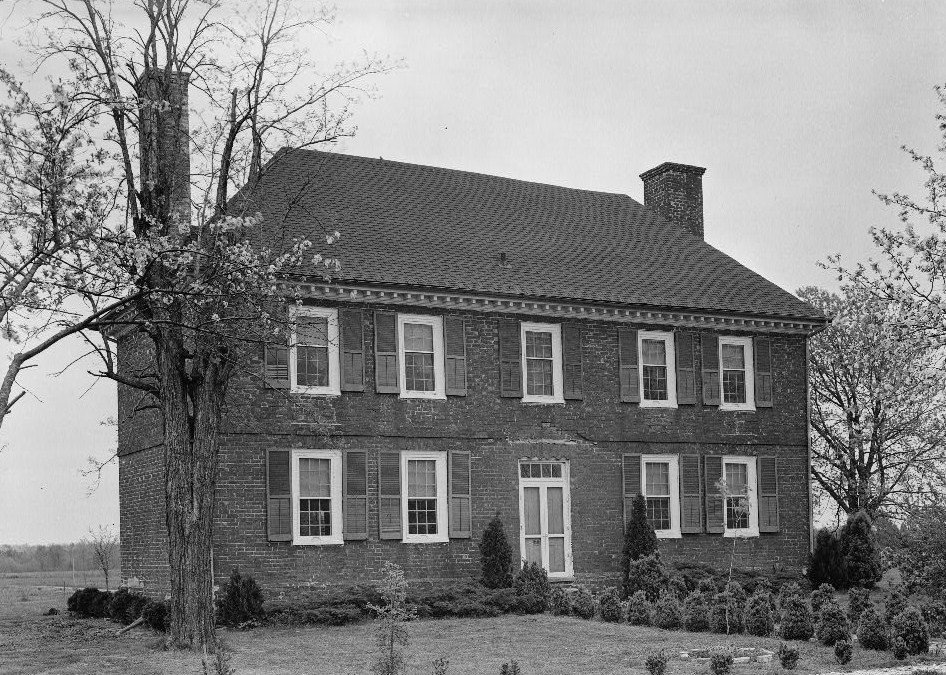
- Indian Banks, HABS Photo
- Nearest city: Simonson, Virginia
- Area: 25 acres (10 ha)
- Built: 1609, 1728
- Architectural style: Colonial
- NRHP reference No.: 80004218
- VLR No.: 079-0009

Significant dates
- Added to NRHP: March 20, 1980
- Designated VLR: January 21, 1975

Indian Banks is a historic home and archaeological site located near Simonson, Richmond County, Virginia. It was built in 1699, and is a two-story, five-bay, Colonial era brick dwelling with a hipped roof and interior end chimneys. The front facade features bricks that are molded or carved into a wavy pattern. A one-story wing was added in 1975. The original Indian Banks was built in 1699 on the site of a Moraughtacund Indian village visited by Captain John Smith (1580–1631), in 1608, but the name, Indian Banks, was not recorded until 1822.

It was added to the National Register of Historic Places in 1980.

== Today ==
It remains a private residence.
