= Simons Corner, Virginia =

Unincorporated community in Virginia, US

Coordinates: 37°51′07″N 76°41′11″W

Simons Corner is an unincorporated community in Richmond County, in the U.S. state of Virginia.

Woodford was added to the National Register of Historic Places in 1983.
