= Menokin =

Historic house in Virginia, United States

- U.S. National Register of Historic Places
- U.S. National Historic Landmark
- Virginia Landmarks Register
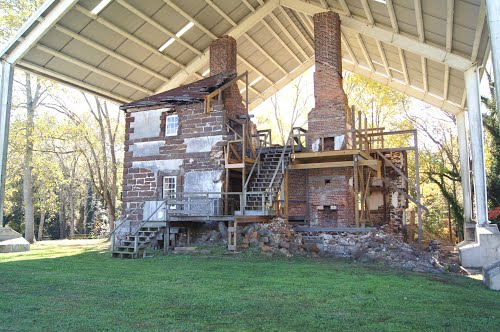
- The plantation in 2014

- Location within Virginia Location within the United States
- Location: NW of jct. of Rtes. 690 and 621, near Warsaw, Virginia
- Coordinates: 38.00842°N 76.80368°W
- Area: 590 acres (240 ha)
- Built: 1769
- Architect: John Ariss
- Architectural style: Georgian
- NRHP reference No.: 69000276
- VLR No.: 079-0011

Significant dates
- Added to NRHP: October 1, 1969
- Designated NHL: November 11, 1971
- Designated VLR: November 5, 1968

Menokin, also known as Francis Lightfoot Lee House, was the plantation of Francis Lightfoot Lee near Warsaw, Virginia, built for him by his wife's father, Col. John Tayloe II, of nearby Mount Airy, the wealthiest planter in the country. Lee, a Founding Father, was a signer of the United States Declaration of Independence. Menokin was declared a National Historic Landmark in 1971.

Historic American Buildings Survey (HABS) documentation, including photos from the 1940s, shows the house standing and reported that it was in poor condition, awaiting a restorer. The National Park Service webpage shows the house in ruins, but reports that woodwork had been removed and placed in storage in the 1960s. Although the house has partly collapsed, the Menokin Foundation has developed a plan to restore the house using glass segments to fill missing portions of the building instead of trying to restore the house to its original condition.

== Native American settlement ==
Before the Menokin plantation was ever developed, this area along Cat Point Creek (also called Rappahannock Creek) was home to the Rappahannock Indian Tribe. In 1608, Capt. John Smith explored the creeks that feed into the Rappahannock River and recorded his meetings with the Rappahannocks, which gives us a written glimpse into the area and its people at that time. The general plantation site was referred to as "Menokin" by the Rappahannocks. The meaning of the word is unknown today. Francis Lightfoot Lee kept the name for his home.

== Construction of Menokin and subsequent decline ==
Menokin was built c. 1769 on the occasion of the marriage of Francis Lightfoot Lee and Rebecca Tayloe. Rebecca was the daughter of John Tayloe II, who built neighboring Mount Airy. John Tayloe II gave the couple the large plantation on Cat Point Creek, approximately five miles upstream from the Rappahannock River, and financed the construction of the two-story stone Menokin and its dependencies. Soon after, Francis Lightfoot Lee joined the cause of American independence, serving in the Continental Congress from 1775 to 1779 and signing the Declaration of Independence (together with his brother Richard Henry Lee) and the Articles of Confederation. Both Francis Lightfoot and Rebecca Tayloe Lee died in the winter of 1797. Menokin was then owned by Rebecca's nephew John Tayloe III, who lived at Mt. Airy and later built the Octagon House in Washington, D.C. Between 1809 and 1819, John Tayloe Lomax, another of John Tayloe II's grandsons, lived at Menokin with his family. Lomax would later become the first Professor of Law at the University of Virginia and a circuit judge for counties of Virginia's Middle and Northern Necks, based at Fredericksburg. During the 19th and 20th centuries, Menokin passed hands several times and went into serious decline around 1935 when it lay, for the most part, vacant and crumbling before coming into possession of The Menokin Foundation in 1995.

== Francis Lightfoot Lee ==
The full story of Francis Lightfoot Lee, and the mark that he made on both the Commonwealth of Virginia and the developing United States of America has not been told. Bits and pieces come from many sources: his letters, letters about him, comments by friends and relatives, and the fact that he was a signer of both the Westmoreland Resolves (February 27, 1766) and the Declaration of Independence (1776). He served in the Virginia House of Burgesses, first from Loudoun, and then from Richmond County. He was in Philadelphia in 1776 as a Virginia delegate to the second Continental Congress, returning to Virginia in 1779. He served briefly in the Viate after that, but for the most part he was content to be at home at Menokin with his books and his farm and his beloved wife, Becky Tayloe. Research concerning the life and work of Francis Lightfoot Lee is an ongoing project of the Menokin Foundation.

== Architectural significance ==
Although Menokin is now in ruin, a remarkable collection of Colonial architectural elements remains. Approximately 80 percent of Menokin's original materials have survived, including: original stones, brick and mortar; queen posts and dragon beams; intact framing assemblages; and the interior woodwork. In 1940, while the house and one outbuilding were still standing, the Historic American Buildings Survey produced detailed photography and comprehensive measured drawings of the property. In 1964, the original pen and ink presentation drawings for Menokin were discovered among some Tayloe family papers in the attic of Mount Airy. Four years later, as the house was in serious trouble of collapsing, the interior woodwork was removed by the owner and put into storage. The surprisingly intact woodwork is back at Menokin and can be viewed at the Foundation's King Conservation and Visitors Center. Menokin's dining room paneling was on loan to the Virginia Historical Society where it was on display in their "Story of Virginia" exhibit; the dining room paneling is now back at Menokin. In 1971, Menokin was designated a National Historic Landmark by the U.S. Department of the Interior. In 2014, the Menokin Foundation embarked on an $8.5 million (~$11.1 million in 2024) capital campaign to replace the missing walls and roof of the ruin with structural glass. The project is slated to be completed by 2024.

In 2018, the Menokin Foundation built the Remembrance Structure, the second example of what they call "Dynamic Preservation," which is defined by a fluid and abstract interpretation of the past that connects the archaic to the modern. The wood-framed structure was built in a preservation workshop using historic methods. It uses modern translucent siding allowing the structure to glow as a memorial to the enslaved and their descendants.

== Timeline ==
- 1657 John Stephens patents the Menokin Tract.
- 1734 Francis Lightfoot Lee born in Westmoreland County, VA on October 14.
- 1743 Charles Grymes leaves Menokin Tract to Philip and Frances Grymes Ludwell
- 1751 John Tayloe II acquires Menokin Tract.
- 1758 Francis Lee and Phillip Ludwell Lee among founders of Leesburg, VA.
- 1758-1769 Francis Lee serves in House of Burgesses from Loudoun County, VA.
- 1766 Francis Lee signs the Westmoreland Resolves against the Stamp Act.
- 1769 Francis Lee marries Rebecca Tayloe of Mt. Airy, Richmond County, VA.
- 1769 1,000 acre Menokin plantation a wedding gift from Colonel John Tayloe II.
- 1769 Menokin plans completed and mansion construction begun.
- 1769-1776 Francis Lee represents Richmond County in the Virginia House of Burgesses.
- 1771 Francis and Rebecca Lee move into Menokin.
- 1775-1779 Francis Lee a member of the Continental Congress.
- 1776 Francis Lee and Richard Henry Lee sign Declaration of Independence.
- 1779 Francis Lee retires from Congress and returns to Menokin "with delight."
- 1780-1782 Francis Lee serves in the Virginia State Senate.
- 1797 Francis and Rebecca Lee die in January and are buried at Mount Airy.
- 1797 Menokin descends to heir of Francis Lightfoot Lee.
- 1799-1800 In a series of seven court-recorded transactions, John Tayloe III gains title to the entire Menokin property.
- 1809-1818 Menokin is home of John Tayloe Lomax, first professor of law at the University of Virginia.
- 1823 John and Anne Tayloe sell Menokin to Benjamin Boughton.
- 1836 Benjamin Boughton sells Menokin to Richard Henry Harwood
- 1872 Estate of Richard H. Harwood sells 700 acres (2.8 km^{2}) of Menokin to John L. Irgens
- 1879 John L. Irgens defaults on payment and Menokin is bought at public auction by the Belfield family
- 1928 Virginia historical marker placed at Menokin.
- 1935 Menokin is inherited by E. Stuart Omohundro as specified in Alfred H. Belfield's will
- 1940 Historic American Buildings Survey documentation begun.
- 1964 Original pen and ink drawing of Menokin found among Tayloe family papers in the attic of Mt. Airy
- 1968 Paneling and interior woodwork removed by Omohundro family for safekeeping.
- 1968 Menokin placed on the Virginia Landmarks Register.
- 1969 Menokin listed on the National Register of Historic Places.
- 1971 Secretary of the Interior designates Menokin a National Historic Landmark.
- 1995 T. E. Omohundro gives the mansion, woodwork and 500 acres (2.0 km^{2}) to The Menokin Foundation in his name, and as a memorial to his deceased sister Dora O. Ricciardi.
- 2002 The Menokin Foundation receives a Save America's Treasures Grant from the National Park Service to aid in preservation of the ruin.
- 2004 The Martin Kirwan King Conservation and Visitors Center is dedicated and opened to the public.
- 2005 Original interior woodwork returns to Menokin by Preservation Virginia
- 2006 Storage Facility is completed and opens to the public.
- 2015 The Glass House Project is launched.
- 2018 The Menokin Remembrance Structure is completed, honoring the enslaved and their descendants.

== See also ==
- List of National Historic Landmarks in Virginia
- National Register of Historic Places listings in Richmond County, Virginia
