= Bladensfield =

Historic house in Virginia, United States

- Formerly listed on the U.S. National Register of Historic Places
- Virginia Landmarks Register
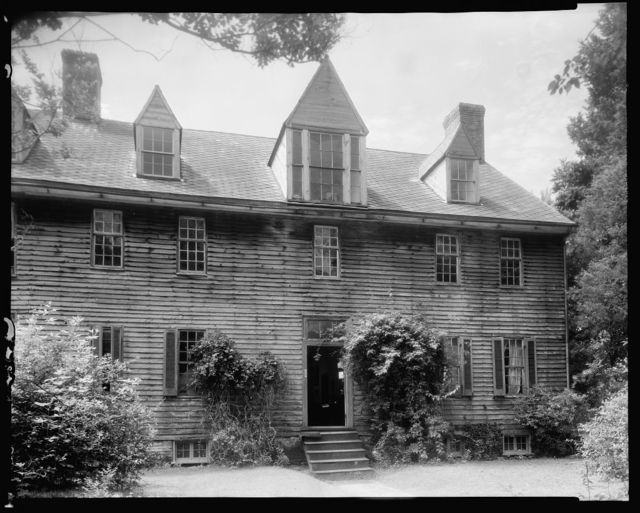
- A photograph of Bladensfield taken by Frances Benjamin Johnston between 1930 and 1939
- Location: NE of Warsaw off VA 203, Warsaw, Virginia
- Area: 10 acres (4.0 ha)
- Built: c. 1790
- Architectural style: Greek Revival, Federal
- NRHP reference No.: 80004219
- VLR No.: 079-0002

Significant dates
- Added to NRHP: October 31, 1980
- Designated VLR: February 19, 1980
- Removed from NRHP: March 19, 2001
- Delisted VLR: March 19, 1997

Bladensfield was a historic home located near Warsaw in Richmond County, Virginia. The home was a 2 1/2-story five-bay, Federal-style frame dwelling with a hipped roof and interior end chimneys. The interior featured Federal and Greek Revival details.

It was added to the National Register of Historic Places in 1980, and delisted in 2001.

== History ==
The land the house was built on was acquired by planter and politician Robert "King" Carter from an English merchant. In 1734, the land was given to his grandson, Robert Carter, as part of his inheritance. Robert built the original Georgian-style home sometime in the latter half of the 18th century. It was likely named Bladensfield after the governor of Maryland, Thomas Bladen, who was his wife's uncle. In 1790, Carter gifted the house to his son-in-law, John Peck, and the property stayed in the family until it was sold to Reverend William N. Ward in 1847.

In 1854, Ward established the Bladensfield Seminary, a school for young women. The house was enlarged by the addition of a two-bay school room. The Wards continued to occupy Bladensfield until it was destroyed by a fire in November 1996.
