= Mathematics and science partnerships =

Mathematics and Science Partnerships (MSP) is education policy from Title 2, Part B, Sections 2201-2203 of the No Child Left Behind Act of 2001. The purpose of MSP is to increase student achievement in science and mathematics by partnering IHE science, math, and engineering departments with elementary and secondary science and math teachers in high-need local educational agencies (LEAs) in order to develop teachers' content knowledge and instructional performance. SEAs may apply for competitive grants and then IHEs and LEAs may apply for a subgrant of the SEA.

== Historical context ==
The United States began to place a greater focus on math and science education during the "Space Race" that began in the 1950s. The launch of Sputnik in 1957 by the Soviet Union created a scare that the United States was not a leader in math and science. In response to Sputnik, the National Defense Education Act initiated education policy that aimed to increase college enrollment and prepare a workforce qualified to compete with the Soviet Union in science and technical fields.

Math and science education continued to receive attention following the Cold War through various programs and policy in the STEM fields. The STEM Education Coalition currently works to promote awareness about the need for improved STEM education and supports legislature that advances teaching and learning in STEM fields.

The National Science Foundation also provides great support for STEM fields through various projects aimed at enhancing interest and performance in STEM through various means of support at the elementary, secondary, and post-secondary levels. Examples of such programs include summer research opportunities for undergraduates, fellowships for graduate students, and professional development for K-12 classroom teacher.

In 2001, President Bush signed the No Child Left Behind Act with the goal of having all students proficient in reading and math by 2014. Mathematics and Science Partnerships fall in the Title 2 section of NCLB, "Improving Teacher Quality Grant Program". Since then, science and math education has continued to be an area of concern in education policy due to the continued fear the United States is not producing innovative leaders in science and technology.

== Design of partnerships ==
The Mathematics and Science Partnerships policy is implemented with the following framework:

1. Teachers partner with math, science, and engineering departments of IHEs (or with businesses or other organizations that have shown success with teacher education in math and science)
2. Partners provide professional development for math and science teachers
3. Student achievement increases as a result of improved teaching

The policy defines a "partnership" as a relationship between, at a minimum, a high-need LEA and a science, math, or engineering department of an IHE. Partnerships may also include an IHE teacher education program in science or math, other LEAs or public, private, and charter schools, a business, and either non-profit or for-profit organizations that have "demonstrated effectiveness in improving the quality of mathematics and science teachers." The partnerships are specifically content based due to the many research findings that show a teacher's content knowledge in math directly correlated to student achievement.

== Examples ==
Implementation of Mathematics and Science Partnerships varies depending on the state and the needs of the schools but follows the same general structure. One example, in the District of Columbia, is a partnership between George Washington University and District of Columbia Public Schools. This partnerships seeks to provide professional development for teaching assistants and faculty in GWU's teacher education program, implement graduate coursework for science teachers that teachers content knowledge beyond the minimum of what teachers would need to know to teach science, and modify curriculum in order to increase inquiry-based learning in science.

Another example of a partnership, in California, is between California State University Dominguez Hills and Whittier City School District. This particular partnerships aims to improve mathematics teaching in grades three through eight by providing research-based professional development that increased teachers' content knowledge and pedagogical skills. The partnership paired mathematics faculty with a teacher over the course of several years. Partnerships have also sought to include innovative teaching resources such as technology and other multimedia sources.

== Funding ==
Awards for MSP began in 2003 and are still active today in all 50 states and the District of Columbia. SEAs may apply for MSP grants and then LEAs apply for a subgrant from the SEA. In 2003 the total appropriation of awards was 12.5 million dollars and by 2008 this had increased to 178,978,000 million dollars. The average new award in 200 was $3,236,593. The National Science Foundations also runs a separate MSP that follows the same model at the section under NCLB but receives significantly more funding (in 2003, the NSF Mathematics and Science Partnerships received 160 million dollars in funding as compared to NCLB's 12.5 million dollars).

=== Changes over time ===
Mathematics and Science Partnerships have received an increased amount of funding year after year but have continued to follow the same model and requirements of partnership. The program was originally administered by the Department of Education through competitive grants but has since switched to grant money being distributed at the state level.
