= Richmond County Courthouse (Virginia) =

Historic courthouse in Virginia, US

- U.S. National Register of Historic Places
- Virginia Landmarks Register
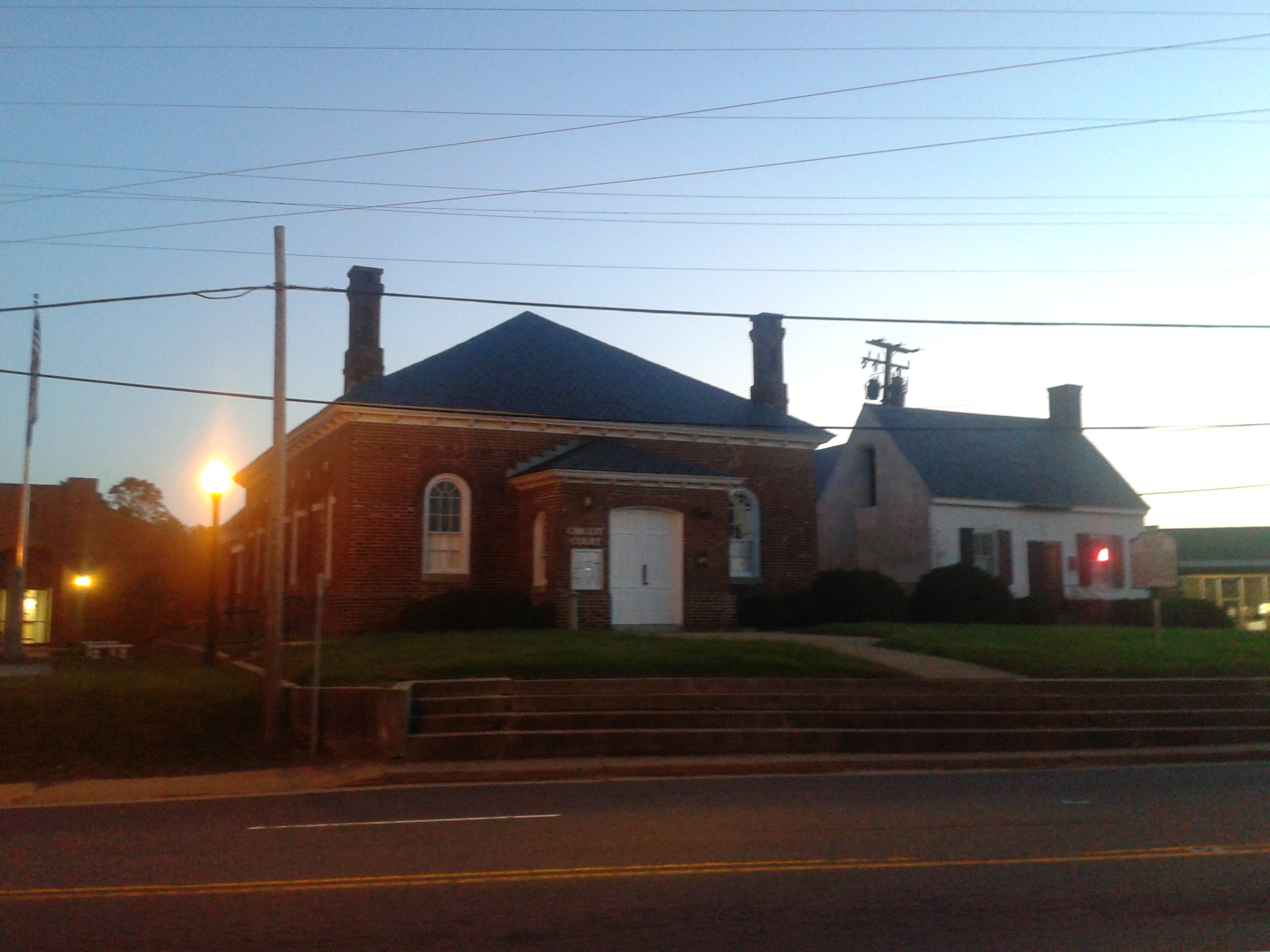
- Old courthouse and clerk's office at dusk, October 2016

- Location within Virginia Location within the United States
- Interactive map showing the location of Richmond County Courthouse
- Location: Jct. of U.S. 360 with VA 3, Warsaw, Virginia
- Coordinates: 37°57′29″N 76°45′30″W
- Area: 9.9 acres (4.0 ha)
- Built: 1748–1750
- Built by: Carter, Landon; Ghequiere, T. Buckler
- Architectural style: Colonial
- NRHP reference No.: 72001413
- VLR No.: 321-0004

Significant dates
- Added to NRHP: December 5, 1972
- Designated VLR: August 15, 1972

Richmond County Courthouse is a historic courthouse building located at Warsaw, Richmond County, Virginia. It was built between 1748 and 1750, and is a one-story Colonial-era brick building with a hipped roof. It measures approximately 52 feet by 41 feet. During a remodeling in 1877, the original arcade was bricked up and incorporated into the main building. Also on the property is a contemporary clerk's office. The buildings were built by planter Landon Carter (1710–1778).

It was added to the National Register of Historic Places in 1972.
