= Farnham, Virginia =

Unincorporated community in Virginia, US

Coordinates: 37°53′07″N 76°37′30″W

Farnham is an unincorporated community in Richmond County, in the U.S. state of Virginia.

== History ==
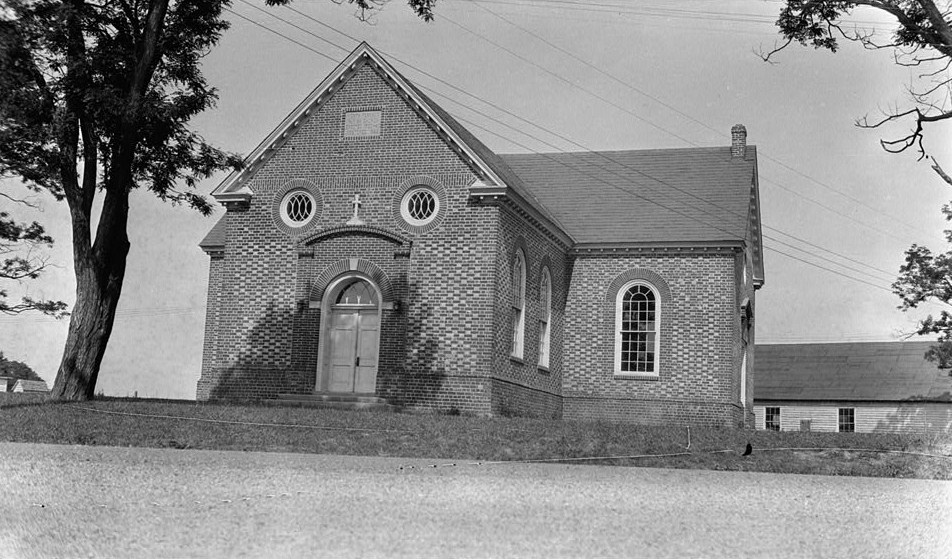
North Farnham Church, North Farnham Church Road) was the site of the Skirmish at Farnham Church during the War of 1812.

Farnham takes its name from Farnham, in Surrey, England.

The North Farnham Church was built in 1737 and has featured in historic events since then. Two years into the War of 1812, bullet holes were left in the walls during a conflict between the Virginia militia and the British fleet, led by Admiral George Cockburn. This event was called the Skirmish at Farnham Church. During the Civil War the church was used by Union soldiers as a stable. It has been restored several times, once in 1872 and again in 1924.

Farnham also includes Scotts Corner, a locality near the intersections of Virginia State Route 602 and Virginia State Route 612. Scotts Corner was named for Henry B. Scott, a landowner who was prominent in local affairs in the mid-1800s. It may also have been named for the Bruce family, Scottish immigrants and landowners who lived in Farnham in the mid-17th century.

Linden Farm, also known as Dew House, is an early 18th-century farm situated on 282 acres. It has been on the National Register of Historic Places since 1977.

== Notable people ==
- Jim Coates, Major League Baseball pitcher for nine seasons
- Cyrus Griffin, last President of the Continental Congress (1788)
- Samuel Hammond, Revolutionary War soldier and officer, Territorial Governor, and statesman
- Joseph Hanks (1725–1793), Abraham Lincoln's great-grandfather.
