= Rappahannock County (1656), Virginia =

Coordinates: 37°57′N 76°50′W

The first Rappahannock County, Virginia — generally known as "Old Rappahannock" County — was founded in 1656 from part of Lancaster County, Virginia and became extinct in 1692 when it was divided to form Essex County and Richmond County, Virginia.

Old Rappahannock County was named for the Native Americans who inhabited the area, Rappahannock reportedly meaning "people of the alternating (i.e., tidal) stream." The county's origins lay in the first efforts by English colonists immigrants to settle the land along the north and south banks of the lower Rappahannock River in the 1640s. The primitive travel capabilities of the day and the county's relatively large area contributed to the settlers' hardship in travel to the county seat to transact business, and became the primary reason for the county's division by an Act of the Virginia General Assembly in 1691 to form the two smaller counties.

In 1833, a new Rappahannock County was founded from the northwest half of Culpeper County, Virginia, far up river, at the headwaters of the Rappahannock.
