= Warsaw, Virginia =

Warsaw
- Town
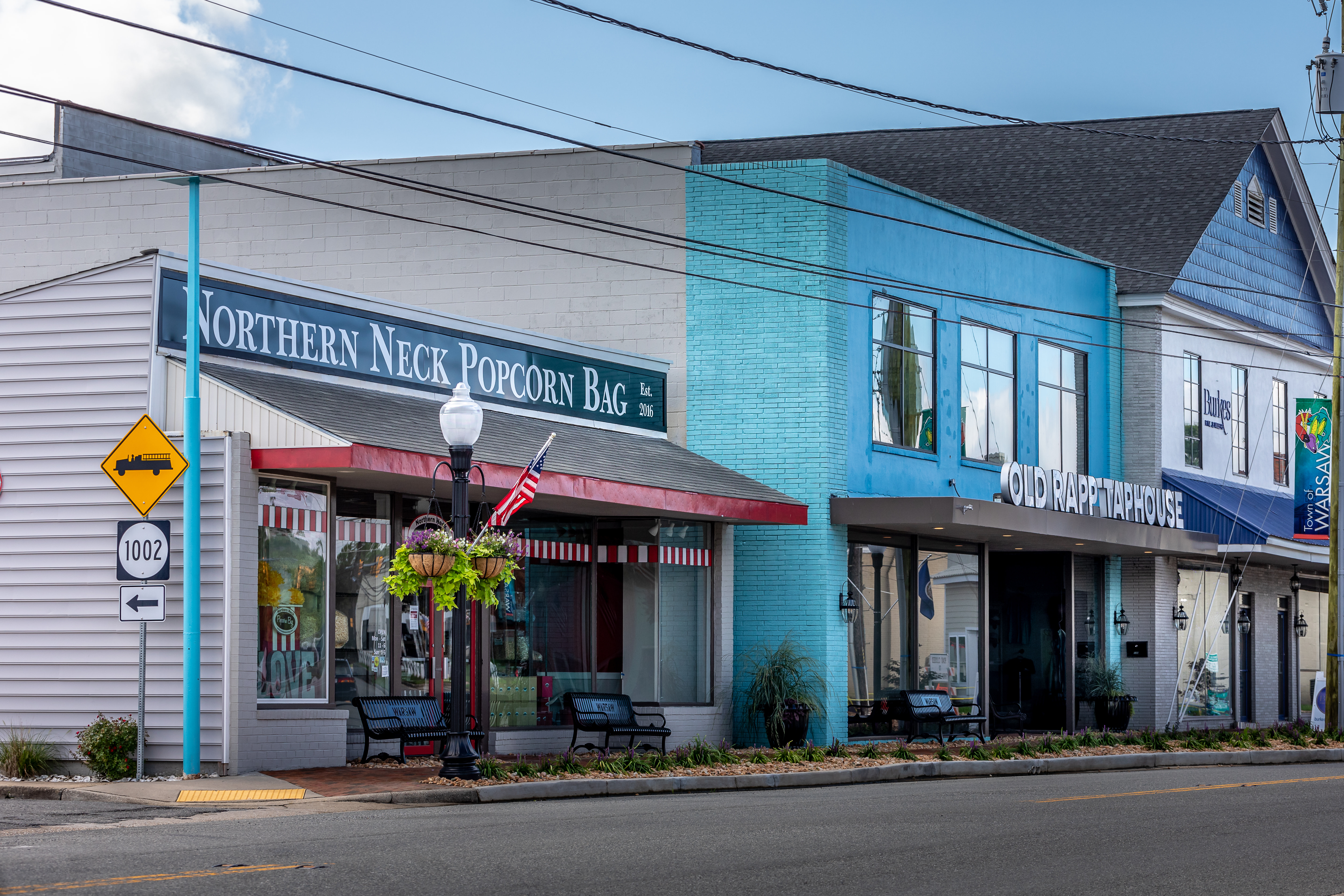
- Downtown Warsaw 2020

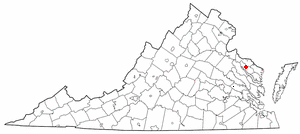
- Location of Warsaw, Virginia
- Coordinates: 37°57′27″N 76°45′30″W
- Country: United States
- State: Virginia
- County: Richmond

Government
  - Type: Council - Manager
  - Mayor: Randall L. Phelps
  - Town Manager: Joseph N. Quesenberry
  - Police Chief: Sean L. Peterson

Area
  - Total: 3.05 sq mi (7.91 km^{2})
  - Land: 3.05 sq mi (7.91 km^{2})
  - Water: 0 sq mi (0.00 km^{2})
- Elevation: 131 ft (40 m)

Population (2020)
  - Total: 1,637
  - Estimate (2023): 2,330
  - Density: 536.0/sq mi (206.95/km^{2})
- Time zone: UTC−5 (Eastern (EST))
  - Summer (DST): UTC−4 (EDT)
- ZIP code: 22572
- Area code: 804
- FIPS code: 51-83168
- GNIS ID: 1500279
- Website: Town website

Warsaw is an incorporated town in and the county seat of Richmond County, Virginia, United States. The population was 1,637 at the 2020 census and is estimated to be 2,330 as of 2023.

== History ==
Prior to English colonization, the area of Warsaw, Virginia was occupied by a group of Rappahannock Native Americans, who would fish on the nearby creeks for shad and herring. By 1667, the Rappahannock people had been forced to sell all their land north of the Rappahannock River to English settlers, including the modern site of Warsaw.

After the division of the Old Rappahannock County in 1692, Richmond County was created. The new county had its seat at Richmond Court House, which was originally along the shores of the Rappahannock River. The site of Richmond Court House was moved inland to modern Warsaw in 1730, and the modern court house was built in 1748. The area was also the home of Robert Wormeley Carter, who represented Richmond County in the Virginia House of Burgesses and the Continental Congress as a supporter of the American Revolution; he owned the historic house of Sabine Hall, located near Richmond Court House. Additionally, the region was subjected to intense British raids during the War of 1812, and many free men of the town were rallied in its defense from the British army. During this time, the area's economy grew reliant on tobacco, as a small group of wealthy planters grew the crop with the labor of indentured settlers and enslaved Africans.

In January 1832, the town's name was changed to Warsaw, after the news of "great uprisings in Old World Warsaw" in 1830 and 1831 reached residents. This change was due to local popular support for the November Uprising in Poland. As with Richmond Court House, a number of other small towns in the United States changed their names to Warsaw at this time, such as Warsaw, Kentucky.

Following the Civil War, the area's newly emancipated freedmen made efforts to secure their own churches and schools. Ultimately, the region's schools and churches would be formally desegregated with the passage of the Civil Rights Act, though all schools in the region would not be fully integrated until the 1970s.

Today, Warsaw is one of many small towns in Virginia's Northern Neck region. The town prides itself on its schools, natural beauty, and quality of life.

== Geography ==
Warsaw is located at 37°57′27″N 76°45′30″W (37.957617, −76.758302).

According to the United States Census Bureau, the town has a total area of 3.0 square miles (7.8 km^{2}), all land.

=== Climate ===
The climate in this area is characterized by hot, humid summers and generally mild to cool winters. According to the Köppen Climate Classification system, Warsaw has a humid subtropical climate, abbreviated "Cfa" on climate maps.

Climate data for Warsaw, Virginia (1991–2020 normals, extremes 1893–present)
Month	Jan	Feb	Mar	Apr	May	Jun	Jul	Aug	Sep	Oct	Nov	Dec	Year
Record high °F (°C)	82 (28)	81 (27)	94 (34)	97 (36)	99 (37)	105 (41)	106 (41)	103 (39)	105 (41)	100 (38)	85 (29)	82 (28)	106 (41)
Mean daily maximum °F (°C)	46.8 (8.2)	50.4 (10.2)	58.5 (14.7)	69.7 (20.9)	77.1 (25.1)	84.3 (29.1)	88.4 (31.3)	86.4 (30.2)	80.4 (26.9)	70.4 (21.3)	59.5 (15.3)	50.0 (10.0)	68.5 (20.3)
Daily mean °F (°C)	37.6 (3.1)	40.3 (4.6)	47.5 (8.6)	57.8 (14.3)	66.2 (19.0)	73.9 (23.3)	78.2 (25.7)	76.2 (24.6)	70.1 (21.2)	59.5 (15.3)	49.3 (9.6)	41.2 (5.1)	58.1 (14.5)
Mean daily minimum °F (°C)	28.5 (−1.9)	30.2 (−1.0)	36.5 (2.5)	45.8 (7.7)	55.3 (12.9)	63.5 (17.5)	68.1 (20.1)	66.1 (18.9)	59.8 (15.4)	48.6 (9.2)	39.1 (3.9)	32.3 (0.2)	47.8 (8.8)
Record low °F (°C)	−6 (−21)	−5 (−21)	5 (−15)	14 (−10)	29 (−2)	38 (3)	47 (8)	44 (7)	30 (−1)	24 (−4)	13 (−11)	−3 (−19)	−6 (−21)
Average precipitation inches (mm)	3.02 (77)	2.60 (66)	3.66 (93)	3.18 (81)	3.90 (99)	4.37 (111)	4.73 (120)	5.01 (127)	4.15 (105)	3.98 (101)	3.29 (84)	3.30 (84)	45.19 (1,148)
Average snowfall inches (cm)	4.4 (11)	3.3 (8.4)	1.4 (3.6)	0.1 (0.25)	0.0 (0.0)	0.0 (0.0)	0.0 (0.0)	0.0 (0.0)	0.0 (0.0)	0.0 (0.0)	0.1 (0.25)	2.2 (5.6)	11.5 (29)
Average precipitation days (≥ 0.01 in)	8.9	8.1	9.3	10.4	11.3	11.0	10.4	9.6	9.0	9.3	8.4	9.1	114.8
Average snowy days (≥ 0.1 in)	1.6	1.5	0.6	0.0	0.0	0.0	0.0	0.0	0.0	0.0	0.0	0.9	4.6
Source: NOAA

== Demographics ==
Historical population
Census	Pop.	Note	%±
1880	115		—
1950	435		—
1960	549		26.2%
1970	511		−6.9%
1980	771		50.9%
1990	961		24.6%
2000	1,375		43.1%
2010	1,512		10.0%
2020	1,637		8.3%
2022 (est.)	2,281	▲	39.3%
U.S. Decennial Census

=== 2020 census ===
As of the 2020 census, Warsaw had a population of 1,637. The median age was 40.8 years. 15.4% of residents were under the age of 18 and 21.2% of residents were 65 years of age or older. For every 100 females there were 120.9 males, and for every 100 females age 18 and over there were 123.4 males age 18 and over.

0.0% of residents lived in urban areas, while 100.0% lived in rural areas.

There were 547 households in Warsaw, of which 25.8% had children under the age of 18 living in them. Of all households, 35.6% were married-couple households, 20.1% were households with a male householder and no spouse or partner present, and 38.9% were households with a female householder and no spouse or partner present. About 40.2% of all households were made up of individuals and 20.1% had someone living alone who was 65 years of age or older.

There were 624 housing units, of which 12.3% were vacant. The homeowner vacancy rate was 1.8% and the rental vacancy rate was 13.6%.

Racial composition as of 2020 (NH = Non-Hispanic)
Race / Ethnicity	Pop 2020	% 2020
White alone (NH)	1033	74.21%
Black or African American alone (NH)	479	17.37%
Native American or Alaska Native alone (NH)	1	0.26%
Asian alone (NH)	10	1.32%
Pacific Islander alone (NH)	0	0.00%
Some Other Race alone (NH)	1	0.00%
Mixed Race/Multi-Racial (NH)	44	3.42%
Hispanic or Latino (any race)	69	3.42%
Total	1,637	100.00%

Note: the US Census treats Hispanic/Latino as an ethnic category. This table excludes Latinos from the racial categories and assigns them to a separate category. Hispanics/Latinos can be of any race.

=== 2000 census ===
As of the census of 2000, there were 1,375 people, 445 households, and 233 families living in the town. The population density was 453.0 people per square mile (174.9 people/km^{2}). There were 468 housing units at an average density of 154.2 units per square mile (59.5 units/km^{2}). The racial makeup of the town was 67.64% White, 29.38% African American, 0.22% Native American, 0.44% Asian, 1.53% from other races, and 0.80% from two or more races. Hispanic or Latino of any race were 4.36% of the population.

There were 445 households, out of which 22.5% had children under the age of 18 living with them, 39.1% were married couples living together, 10.8% had a female householder with no husband present, and 47.6% were non-families. 45.6% of all households were made up of individuals, and 24.3% had someone living alone who was 65 years of age or older. The average household size was 2.01 and the average family size was 2.81.

In the town, the population was spread out, with 13.3% under the age of 18, 9.7% from 18 to 24, 28.1% from 25 to 44, 19.4% from 45 to 64, and 29.5% who were 65 years of age or older. The median age was 44 years. For every 100 females, there were 102.2 males. For every 100 females aged 18 and over, there were 103.8 males.

The median income for a household in the town was $28,971, and the median income for a family was $44,167. Males had a median income of $40,052 versus $23,661 for females. The per capita income for the town was $21,392. About 12.4% of families and 16.8% of the population were below the poverty line, including 20.6% of those under age 18 and 16.4% of those age 65 or over.

== Economy ==
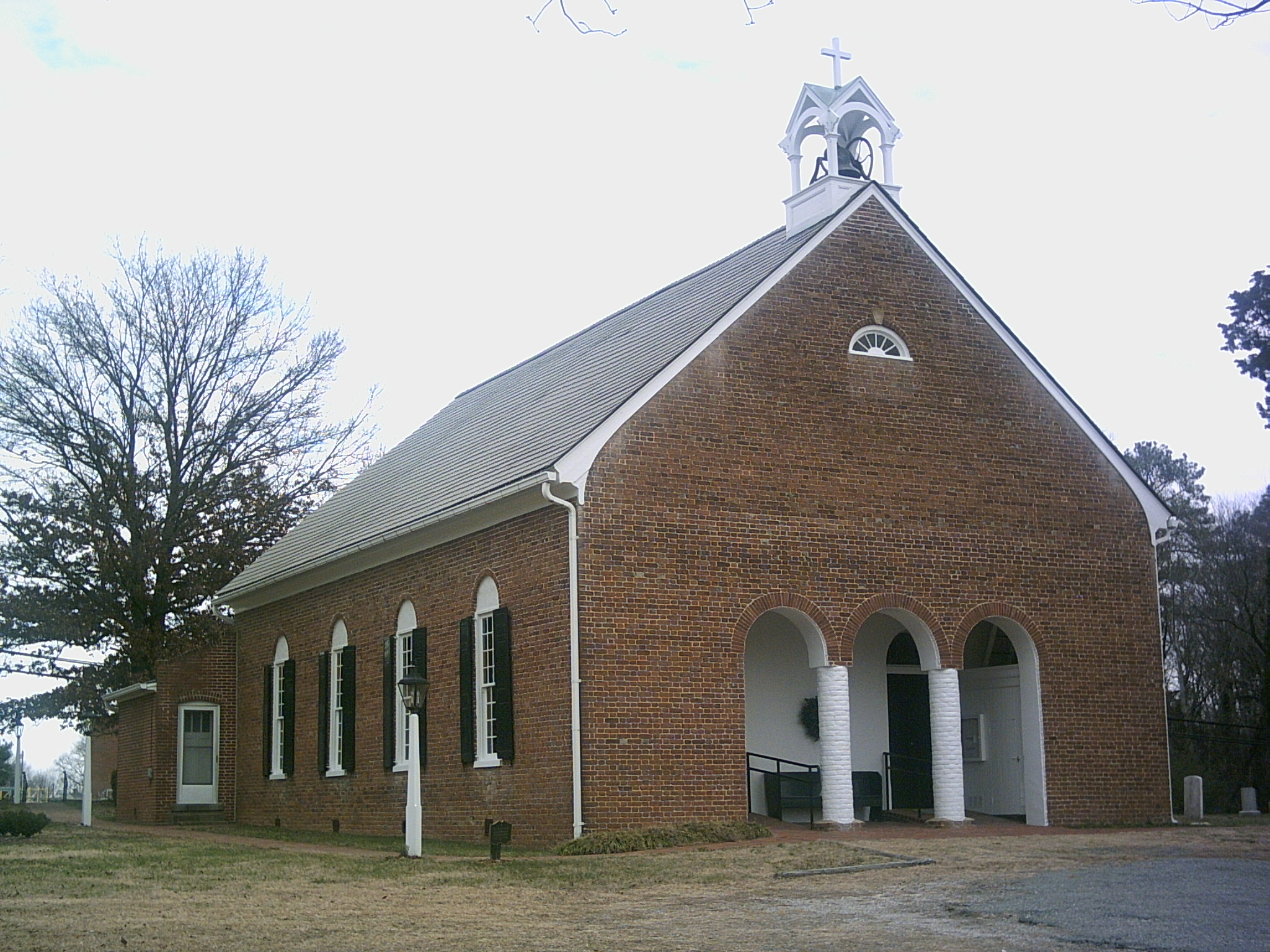
St. John's Episcopal Church in Warsaw

Warsaw serves as the hub of Richmond County and provides a wide array of economic opportunities. As of 2017, 40% of the town's employment came from educational, health, and social services. Educationally, the town is home to an elementary and middle school, a high school, a technical school, and a campus of the Rappahannock Community College.

Warsaw is also the location of the Northern Neck Regional Jail, which was completed in 1995. The jail employs 100 people and has a capacity of 460 inmates. Its most recent addition was completed in 2000.

The area also uses its historic importance to promote tourism. Historic sites nearby include Menokin, the former home of Francis Lightfoot Lee, Mount Airy and Sabine Hall. A former plantation estate, Belle Mount, is currently operated as a vineyard and winery within a few miles of Warsaw town limits. In addition to Menokin, Mount Airy, and Sabine Hall, Grove Mount and the Richmond County Courthouse are listed on the National Register of Historic Places. The formerly listed Bladensfield was destroyed by fire in 1996.

== Notable people ==
- Cal Bowdler – power forward for NBA's Atlanta Hawks (1999–2002)
- Robert Wormeley Carter – member of the Virginia House of Burgesses and the Continental Congress
- Jim Coates – professional baseball pitcher for several Major League Baseball teams
- William Atkinson Jones – member of United States House of Representatives, early supporter of Philippine Independence
- W. Tayloe Murphy (1901–1961), state delegate and state senator
- Tom Robbins – Author who recounted his childhood of living in Warsaw in his autobiography Tibetan Peach Pie
