= Northern Neck =

Peninsula in Virginia, United States

- Region
- Map of Virginia with the Northern Neck region shown in red
- Coordinates: 37°58′N 76°38′W
- Country: United States
- State: Virginia

The Northern Neck is the northernmost of three peninsulas (traditionally called "necks" in Virginia) on the western shore of the Chesapeake Bay in the Commonwealth of Virginia (along with the Middle Peninsula and the Virginia Peninsula). The Potomac River forms the northern boundary of the peninsula; the Rappahannock River demarcates it on the south. The land between these rivers was formed into Northumberland County in 1648, prior to the creation of Westmoreland County and Lancaster County.

The Northern Neck encompasses the following Virginia counties: Lancaster, Northumberland, Richmond, and Westmoreland; it had a total population of 50,158 as of the 2020 census.

Commentators vary as to whether to include King George County in the Northern Neck. Historically, Charles II's grant for the Northern Neck included all land between the Rappahannock and Potomac rivers, including far upstream of King George County comprising some five million acres. The boundaries of King George and Westmoreland counties have changed radically since their establishment, with significant exchanges of territory. Significant portions of the early King George County lie in present-day Westmoreland County.

== History ==
=== 17th century ===
In the winter of 1607–08, Captain John Smith traveled up the Rappahannock River as a prisoner of the Powhatans. He was the first European known to have visited the Northern Neck. He repeated the voyage in June 1608, with 14 companions in an open barge, reaching the Potomac River by June 16. He visited Native American villages, including one near present-day Nomini, which he described and named in later accounts, but found no treasure, only an abundance of fur-bearing animals. In 1621, the boy Henry Fleete was among the passengers on a ship taking new governor Francis Wyatt to Virginia, and shortly after his arrival he accompanied Captain Henry Spelman on a trading trip up the Potomac River that included founding a trading post in Georgetown, later incorporated into Washington, D.C. However, on March 22, 1622, Spelman and 19 crewmen were killed in a native village during the widespread massacres on that day, but Fleet was allowed to live as a prisoner until ransomed five years later. He soon sailed to England and formed a business relationship with William Cloberry, who funded a trading voyage from Virginia to New England. By 1628 Fleet had accumulated enough money to buy a plantation in Accomac County on Virginia's Eastern Shore, and he continued to support his family by trading as well as acting as an interpreter with native tribes, including for Maryland Governor Leonard Calvert during a period of residence in Maryland, where he purchased land. Fleet again returned to England from 1646 until 1648, where he married a much younger woman, then brought her to Virginia, where he patented 1,750 acres of land in what soon officially became vast Lancaster County. Fleet became one of the county's first four burgesses in 1652 but died intestate in 1660 or 1661.

Meanwhile, in 1634, the Crown reserved the land between the Rappahannock and Potomac Rivers for native Americans, calling it the "Chicacoan Indian District". Nonetheless, many of the original English settlers were Marylanders, who had settled on Kent Island but were caught in a long running controversy between Virginia trader (and burgess) William Claiborne and Lord Baltimore over the island's ownership. Claiborne aligned with the Parliamentary party during England's Civil War, and Lord Baltimore had been King Charles' Secretary of State before his death in 1632, shortly before King Charles formally affirmed Calvert's claim as superior. In late 1637 or early 1638, Lord Baltimore's son and heir Cecil Calvert sent his brother Leonard to occupy Kent Island by force, hence the exodus to the Virginia shore. In 1639, the Proprietors of the Island of Bermuda petitioned leave to have settlers occupy that land between the Rappahannock and Potomac rivers. Although that petition disappeared and presumably was not granted, in 1641 the Virginia General Assembly granted the right to do so "provided that the number that seat there bee not under twoe hundred persons, and not less than six able tithable persons in everye familye that there sitt [sic]" and the following year also gave permission for prospective settlement north of the Rappahannock River while also denying "for divers reasons" the right to occupy the land.

John Carter Sr. received the first specific land grant north of the Rappahannock River on August 15, 1642, for 1300 acres on Cossotomen Creak (which became Carters Creek). Carter settled on the land several years later, farmed it using enslaved labor and made it his home, creating Corotoman Plantation. Carter also would serve many terms as a burgess representing Lancaster County, as well as hold local civil and military offices. In 1642-43, three others received land grants in what eventually became Lancaster County; then six years passed before Epaphroditus Lawson received a land grant for 700 acres beginning on the eastward side of the mouth of Slaughter's Creek and adjoining John Carter's land. The Virginia General Assembly officially allowed settlement of the Northern Neck on October 12, 1648, by creating then-vast Northumberland County as the neck of land between those rivers. The Northumberland County Court was first held on August 24, 1650, and set up a government, only to be divided at the next General Assembly session, whereby the part west of the ridge became then-vast Rappahannock County.

The original Northern Neck land grant in 1661 was a land grant first issued by the exiled English King Charles II in 1649. It encompassed all the unsettled lands bounded by the Potomac and Rappahannock Rivers and, later, by a straight line (the "Fairfax Line") connecting their sources. This grant was significantly larger than the area currently known as the Northern Neck. John Carter's descendant received the nickname King Carter and was not only the local Virginia agent for the England-based proprietor, but also a powerful politician and landowner in his own right. The relation between proprietary lands and non-proprietary lands created considerable confusion and some degree of semi-autonomy relative to the colonial government until the American Revolution.

Most early development occurred on the peninsula's eastern end, because both the Potomac and Rappahannock river were navigable waters, and roads were limited and/or in poor condition. The autonomy and the excellent natural resources allowed rich planters to arise who established tobacco plantations in the Northern Neck. During the Colonial period, some considered the Northern Neck as the "Athens of the New World" because it had many wealthy landowners who were dedicated to learning, gentlemanly society, and civic duty. However, this elite society and economy was based on the exploitation of enslaved Africans and black Americans. The aristocratic society and autonomy of the Northern Neck created strong antipathies between the Northern Neck and other regions of Virginia. Later as tobacco cultivation and erosion wore out the soil, and the remainder of the mid-Atlantic states became developed, the Northern Neck's importance declined. It was relatively isolated from main trade routes and cities. This isolation may be a product of the earlier antipathies related to the differences in society in the Neck and in the regions farther south.

In 1687, a widespread slave conspiracy was crushed in the Northern Neck. During a mass funeral, slaves in the area planned to kill all whites and escape. The plot was discovered, and its leaders executed. When authorities learned that they had plotted the uprising at gatherings for slave funerals, they prohibited such events.

The next year, in 1688, the Northern Neck was the site of another attempted uprising, this one led by "Sam, a Negro Servt to Richard Metcalfe." A repeat offender, he had "several times endeavored to promote a Negro Insurreccon in this Colony." "To deter him & others from the like evil practice for time to come," the court ordered the sheriff of James City County to whip him severely and return him to the Westmoreland County sheriff to be whipped again. Sam was sentenced to forever wear "a strong Iron collar affixed about his neck with four sprigs." Should he leave his master's plantation or remove the collar, he would be hanged.

=== 18th century ===
In February 1766, 115 Northern Neck prominent citizens signed the Leedstown Resolutions, named after Leedstown, an active port in (then) King George County. This was the first recorded act of resistance against the Stamp Act. Leedstown is now in Westmoreland County.

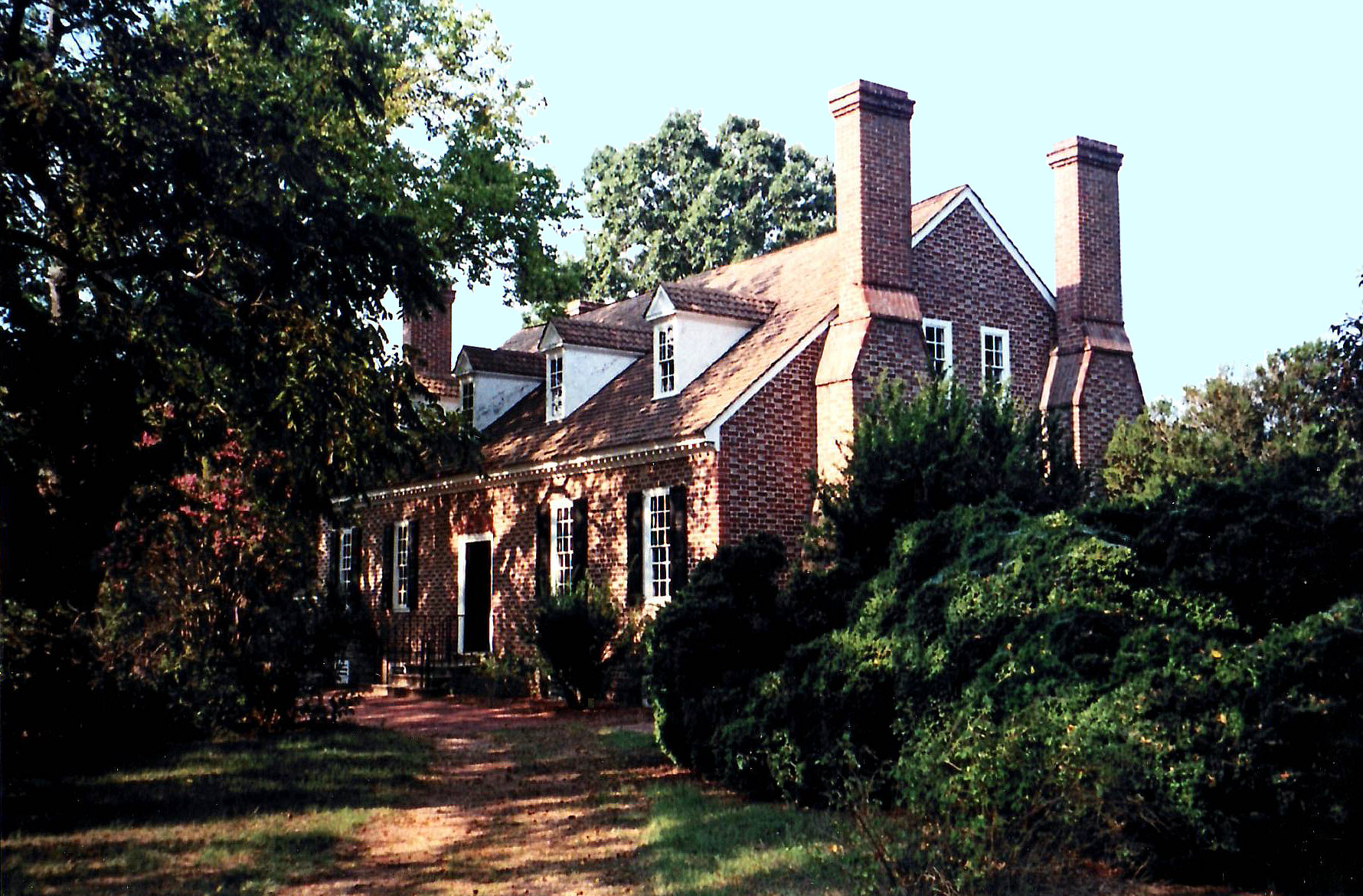
George Washington Birthplace National Monument in Westmoreland County

Mixed vegetable and grain farming were adopted by the later colonial period.

Later, the area developed a strong seafood industry. Reedville was once the wealthiest town in the United States, due to its menhaden fishing industry. Before the era of modern highways, many passenger and freight steamer routes linked the Chesapeake Bay region and connected with the railroads developed after 1830.

Many important historical figures were born on the Northern Neck, including U.S. presidents George Washington (Westmoreland), James Madison (Port Conway in King George), and James Monroe (Westmoreland), as well as signers of the Declaration of Independence, Francis Lightfoot Lee and Richard Henry Lee, and the Confederate Civil War general Robert E. Lee. Richard Henry Lee was elected as the sixth president under the Articles of Confederation. Also residing in Westmoreland was Colonel Nicholas Spencer, member of the House of Burgesses, secretary and president of the Governor's Council, and on the departure of his cousin Thomas Colepeper, 2nd Baron Colepeper (aka Lord Culpeper), acting governor. Robert Carter I, agent for Thomas Fairfax, 6th Lord Fairfax of Cameron, born at Corotoman Plantation, became President of the Governor's Council of the Virginia Colony and briefly acting Governor of Virginia (1726-1727) following the death in office of Governor Hugh Drysdale. His sons John Carter married Elizabeth Hill of Shirley Plantation and Landon Carter married Maria Byrd, daughter of Col. William Byrd II and resided at Sabine Hall, his grandson Robert Carter III inherited Nonomy Hall – purchased from the aforementioned Nicholas Spencer. Finally, the Tayloe Family established their family seat Mount Airy, on the southern shore of the neck, across from Tappahannock on a high perch overlooking the Rappahannock River. John Tayloe I, John Tayloe II who built Mount Airy and after Menokin for his son-in-law Francis Lightfoot Lee, John Tayloe III who later built the Octagon House and his sons John Tayloe IV, Benjamin Ogle Tayloe, William Henry Tayloe and George Plater Tayloe were all born here.

==== American Civil War ====
During the American Civil War, Northern Neck and particularly, King George County were on the frontier between the Union and Confederate armies. As such, King George was an operating base for spies on both sides. The Union forces controlled the Potomac River and the north shore of the Rappahannock River farther upstream for much of the war.

While trying to elude Union cavalry, on April 21, 1865, the co-conspirators John Wilkes Booth and David Herold crossed by rowboat into the Northern Neck in King George County from Maryland after assassinating President Abraham Lincoln. Booth and Herold landed at the mouth of Gambo Creek before meeting with Confederate agents who guided their passage to Port Conway. There, they crossed the Rappahannock River to Port Royal in Caroline County. Booth was killed and Herold captured a short distance away at Garrett's Farm.

==== Colonial Beach ====
Colonial Beach, a small incorporated town in Westmoreland County located on the Potomac River waterfront, developed as a popular tourist spot for the people of the Washington, D.C. area in the nineteenth and twentieth centuries. It offered a beach, swimming, and gambling. The gambling facilities were built on piers extending into the Potomac River to ensure they were inside Maryland, as the state border runs along the southern low tide line of the Potomac River. With the end of gambling, and improved access to competing beaches in Maryland and Delaware, Colonial Beach declined in popularity as a tourist destination. It and the rest of the Northern Neck still continue to attract dedicated outdoor enthusiasts for fishing and boating.

== Geography ==
The region has 1100 miles of shoreline, containing beaches, marinas, old steamship wharfs, and small towns that date to colonial times. Today small farms, vineyards, and wineries are interspersed with retirement communities and rural businesses that share the land. Since the 1970s, winemaking has increased in importance in the Northern Neck. The federal government has recognized the Northern Neck George Washington Birthplace American Viticultural Area as a sanctioned wine appellation for wines grown in the five counties.

Significant portions of the Rappahannock River Valley National Wildlife Refuge lie in the Northern Neck. It also is home to five state parks and natural areas, including Caledon Natural Area, Bush Mill Stream Natural Area Preserve, Dameron Marsh Natural area, and Westmoreland and Belle Isle state parks. The George Washington Birthplace National Monument is a National Park Service unit.

== Museums ==
- A. T. Johnson High School Museum – one of the first black American high schools in the Neck, located in Montross
- Essex County Museum and Historical Society in Tappahannock – relates Neck history from pre-colonial through today
- George Washington Birthplace National Monument documents the life of local George Washington and agricultural practices of the colonial period
- Historic Christ Church in Weems – built in 1735, is one of the best-preserved of colonial Virginia's Anglican parish churches
- Kilmarnock Town Museum – local history
- Kinsale Museum – local history
- Museum at Colonial Beach – local history
- Westmoreland County Museum and Library – local history
- Richmond County Museum – local history
- King George County Historical Society Museum – local history
- Mary Ball Washington Museum and Library – features Lancaster County history with exhibits and speakers. The History and Genealogical Library has approximately 10,000 books and manuscripts, with emphasis on the Northern Neck, Virginia and Maryland colonial records, local family genealogies, plantations and churches, and all major state and local periodicals and magazines
- Menokin – home of Francis Lightfoot Lee, who signed the Declaration of Independence, located in Warsaw
- Morattico Waterfront Museum – features the Morattico Country Store, wharf, and crab and fishing industry along the Rappahannock River in Lancaster County
- Northern Neck Farm Museum – farming in the area
- Reedville Fisherman's Museum – local fishing industry
- Steamboat Era Museum – history of steamboats when the rivers were the most important transport routes in the state
- Stratford Hall Plantation – built in 1730, birthplace of Robert E. Lee, exhibits of his life

== Festivals ==
In 2004, the Menokin Bluegrass Festival was launched in Richmond County at the ruins of Francis Lightfoot Lee's ancestral home, Menokin. The festival attracts thousands of bluegrass fans every year to celebrate the Northern Neck's musical and historical heritage.

The Richmond County Fair, started in 1989, is dubbed the "Biggest Little Fair in the South". It is held in August in Warsaw. The King George Fall Festival, founded in 1959, is held the second weekend of October in King George County. All proceeds from this event go to support the King George Fire and Rescue. The Fall Festival Committee is made up of representatives from all of the county's community organizations. The Fall Festival includes a parade through town, a carnival, a craft fair, a dance, and the Fall Festival Queen Pageant.

Stratford Hall hosts an annual Historical Haunts program. Activities include ghost tours of the Great House, pumpkin painting, various Halloween crafts, picture-taking with Frankenstein and a witch, and an eighteenth-century fortune teller.

== Tourism ==
Tourism is a significant source of economic activity in the Northern Neck region. Visitors are attracted to the natural resources, and history and heritage of the peninsula. Natural attractions include national parks, state parks, and agri-tourism, while a number of historic sites related to the nation's founders are open to the public. Colonial Beach, Westmoreland State Park, Rappahannock River National Wildlife Refuge, and many other locations provide water access for fishing, boating, and yachting. The region has twenty-seven marinas.

There are nine wineries in the region that may be found on the Chesapeake Bay Wine Trail.

Other popular Northern Neck attractions include Stratford Hall, the birthplace of Robert E. Lee and an example of a Virginia plantation, George Washington Birthplace National Monument, the Westmoreland Berry Farm, and the Westmoreland State Park with Horsehead Cliffs.

The Northern Neck National Heritage Area was established in the National Heritage Area Act in 2022. The National Heritage Area will help preserve historic and cultural sites in the five counties.
