= Richmond County, Virginia =

County in Virginia, United States

- County
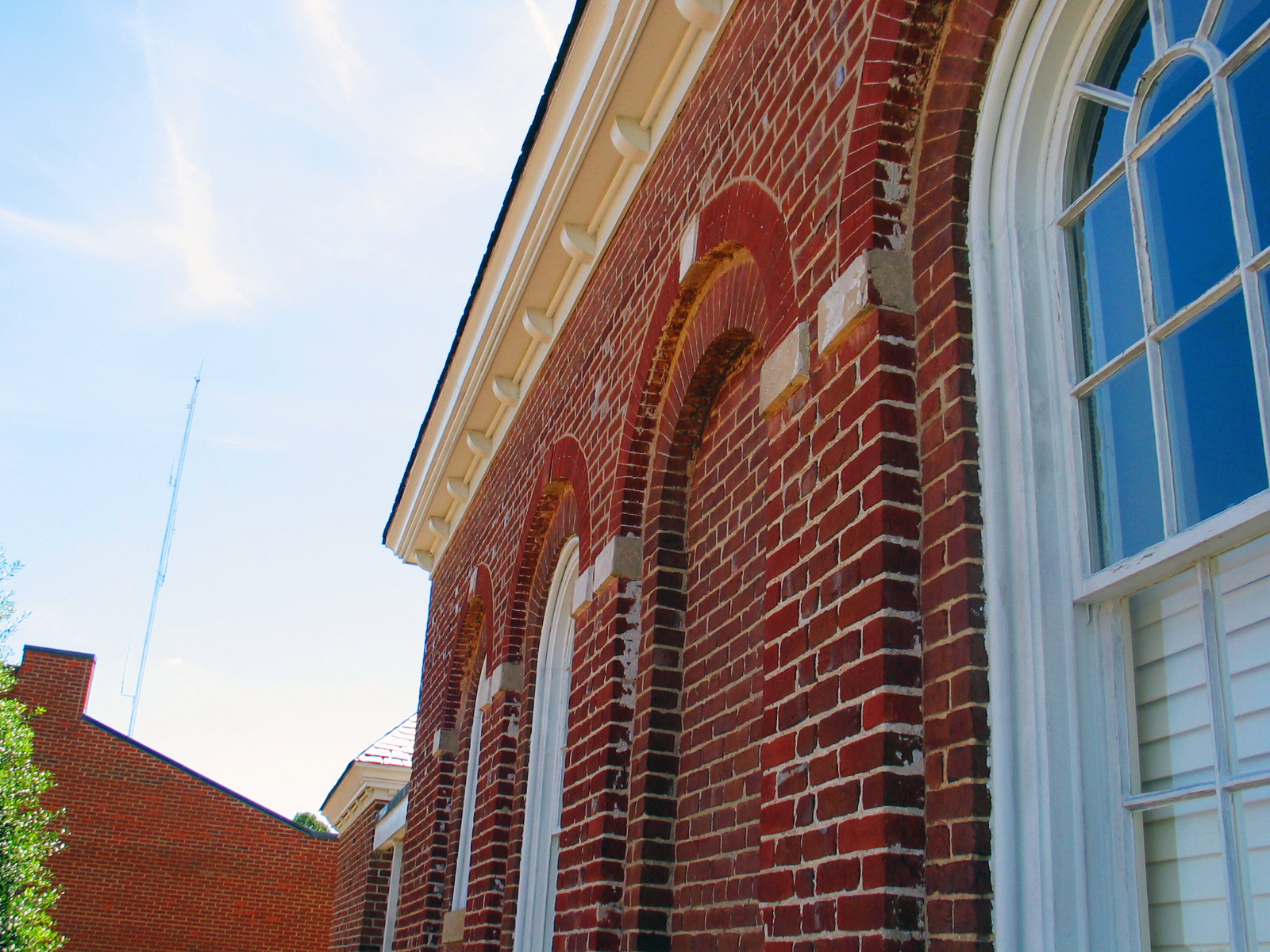
- Richmond County Courthouse in Warsaw

- Seal

- Location within the U.S. state of Virginia
- Coordinates: 37°56′N 76°43′W
- Country: United States
- State: Virginia
- Founded: 1692
- Named for: Richmond, London or Charles Lennox
- Seat: Warsaw
- Largest town: Warsaw

Area
  - Total: 216 sq mi (560 km^{2})
  - Land: 191 sq mi (490 km^{2})
  - Water: 25 sq mi (65 km^{2}) 11.5%

Population (2020)
  - Total: 8,923
  - Estimate (2025): 9,294 ▲
  - Density: 46.7/sq mi (18.0/km^{2})
- Time zone: UTC−5 (Eastern)
  - Summer (DST): UTC−4 (EDT)
- Congressional district: 1st
- Website: co.richmond.va.us

Richmond County is a county located on the Northern Neck in the U.S. state of Virginia. As of the 2020 census, the population sits at 8,923. Its county seat is Warsaw. The rural county should not be confused with the large city and state capital Richmond, Virginia. It was formed in 1692 when the first Rappahannock County was divided to form Richmond County and Essex County.

== Geography ==
According to the U.S. Census Bureau, the county has a total area of 216 square miles (560 km^{2}), of which 191 square miles (490 km^{2}) is land and 25 square miles (65 km^{2}) (11.5%) is water.

=== Adjacent counties ===
- Westmoreland County – north
- Northumberland County – east
- Lancaster County – southeast
- Essex County – southwest

=== National protected area ===
- Rappahannock River Valley National Wildlife Refuge (part) Franklin, Island Farm, Laurel Grove, Peter, Tayloe, Wellford, Wilna, Wright units; Menokin, Wellford easements

=== Major highways ===
- US 360
- SR 3
- SR 203
- SR 608
- SR 642
- SR 624

== Demographics ==
Historical population
Census	Pop.	Note	%±
1790	6,985		—
1800	13,744		96.8%
1810	6,214		−54.8%
1820	5,706		−8.2%
1830	6,055		6.1%
1840	5,965		−1.5%
1850	6,448		8.1%
1860	6,856		6.3%
1870	6,503		−5.1%
1880	7,195		10.6%
1890	7,146		−0.7%
1900	7,088		−0.8%
1910	7,415		4.6%
1920	7,434		0.3%
1930	6,878		−7.5%
1940	6,634		−3.5%
1950	6,189		−6.7%
1960	6,375		3.0%
1970	5,841		−8.4%
1980	6,952		19.0%
1990	7,273		4.6%
2000	8,809		21.1%
2010	9,254		5.1%
2020	8,923		−3.6%
2025 (est.)	9,294	▲	4.2%
U.S. Decennial Census; 1790–1960 1900–1990; 1990–2000 2010 2020

=== Racial and ethnic composition ===
Richmond County, Virginia – Racial and ethnic composition Note: the US Census treats Hispanic/Latino as an ethnic category. This table excludes Latinos from the racial categories and assigns them to a separate category. Hispanics/Latinos may be of any race.
Race / Ethnicity (NH = Non-Hispanic)	Pop 1980	Pop 1990	Pop 2000	Pop 2010	Pop 2020	% 1980	% 1990	% 2000	% 2010	% 2020
White alone (NH)	4,706	5,004	5,616	5,755	5,564	67.69%	68.80%	63.75%	62.19%	62.36%
Black or African American alone (NH)	2,187	2,186	2,913	2,793	2,419	31.46%	30.06%	33.07%	30.18%	27.11%
Native American or Alaska Native alone (NH)	2	8	8	24	16	0.03%	0.11%	0.09%	0.26%	0.18%
Asian alone (NH)	3	23	28	39	42	0.04%	0.32%	0.32%	0.42%	0.47%
Native Hawaiian or Pacific Islander alone (NH)	x	x	0	2	0	x	x	0.00%	0.02%	0.00%
Other race alone (NH)	4	0	1	4	5	0.06%	0.00%	0.01%	0.04%	0.06%
Mixed race or Multiracial (NH)	x	x	58	127	280	x	x	0.66%	1.37%	3.14%
Hispanic or Latino (any race)	50	52	185	510	597	0.72%	0.71%	2.10%	5.51%	6.69%
Total	6,952	7,273	8,809	9,254	8,923	100.00%	100.00%	100.00%	100.00%	100.00%

=== 2020 census ===
As of the 2020 census, the county had a population of 8,923. The median age was 43.5 years. 17.7% of residents were under the age of 18 and 20.5% of residents were 65 years of age or older. For every 100 females there were 124.6 males, and for every 100 females age 18 and over there were 129.0 males age 18 and over.

The racial makeup of the county was 64.3% White, 27.3% Black or African American, 0.2% American Indian and Alaska Native, 0.5% Asian, 0.0% Native Hawaiian and Pacific Islander, 3.1% from some other race, and 4.6% from two or more races. Hispanic or Latino residents of any race comprised 6.7% of the population.

0.0% of residents lived in urban areas, while 100.0% lived in rural areas.

There were 3,173 households in the county, of which 26.4% had children under the age of 18 living with them and 30.8% had a female householder with no spouse or partner present. About 31.7% of all households were made up of individuals and 16.3% had someone living alone who was 65 years of age or older.

There were 3,932 housing units, of which 19.3% were vacant. Among occupied housing units, 70.3% were owner-occupied and 29.7% were renter-occupied. The homeowner vacancy rate was 1.8% and the rental vacancy rate was 8.7%.

=== 2000 Census ===
Age pyramid for Richmond County, based on census 2000 data

As of the census of 2000, there were 8809 people, 2,937 households, and 2,000 families residing in the county. The population density was 46 people per square mile (18 people/km^{2}). There were 3,512 housing units at an average density of 18 units per square mile (6.9 units/km^{2}). The racial makeup of the county was 64.77% White, 33.17% Black or African American, 0.09% Native American, 0.32% Asian, 0.07% Pacific Islander, 0.85% from other races, and 0.73% from two or more races. 2.10% of the population were Hispanic or Latino of any race.

There were 2,937 households, out of which 27.20% had children under the age of 18 living with them, 52.30% were married couples living together, 11.80% had a female householder with no husband present, and 31.90% were non-families. 28.30% of all households were made up of individuals, and 14.20% had someone living alone who was 65 years of age or older. The average household size was 2.40 and the average family size was 2.93.

In the county, the population was spread out, with 18.40% under the age of 18, 8.00% from 18 to 24, 31.80% from 25 to 44, 24.10% from 45 to 64, and 17.70% who were 65 years of age or older. The median age was 40 years. For every 100 females there were 127.60 males. For every 100 females age 18 and over, there were 131.90 males.

The median income for a household in the county was $33,026, and the median income for a family was $42,143. Males had a median income of $30,722 versus $21,807 for females. The per capita income for the county was $16,675. About 11.90% of families and 15.40% of the population were below the poverty line, including 21.20% of those under age 18 and 12.50% of those age 65 or over.

In 2004 the Menokin Bluegrass Festival (later changed to Menokin Music Festival) was launched in Richmond County at the ruins of Francis Lightfoot Lee's (a signer of the Declaration of Independence) ancestral home, Menokin. The festival attracts thousands of music fans every year in a celebration of the Northern Neck's historical legacy.

== Government ==
Supervisors of Richmond County (2022) are:

- Richard E. Thomas Sr. (District 1, Vice Chair)
- John David Parr (District 2)
- William C. Herbert, II (District 3)
- Robert B. Pemberton (District 4)
- F. Lee Sanders (District 5, chair)

The County Administrator is R. Morgan Quicke.

== Education ==
Richmond County Public Schools operates 2 public school campuses with about 1300 total students enrolled. Richmond County Elementary / Middle School serves grades K-7, and Rappahannock High School serves grades 8–12. The current Superintendent (2022) is Bernard S. "Trey" Davis III.

== Communities ==
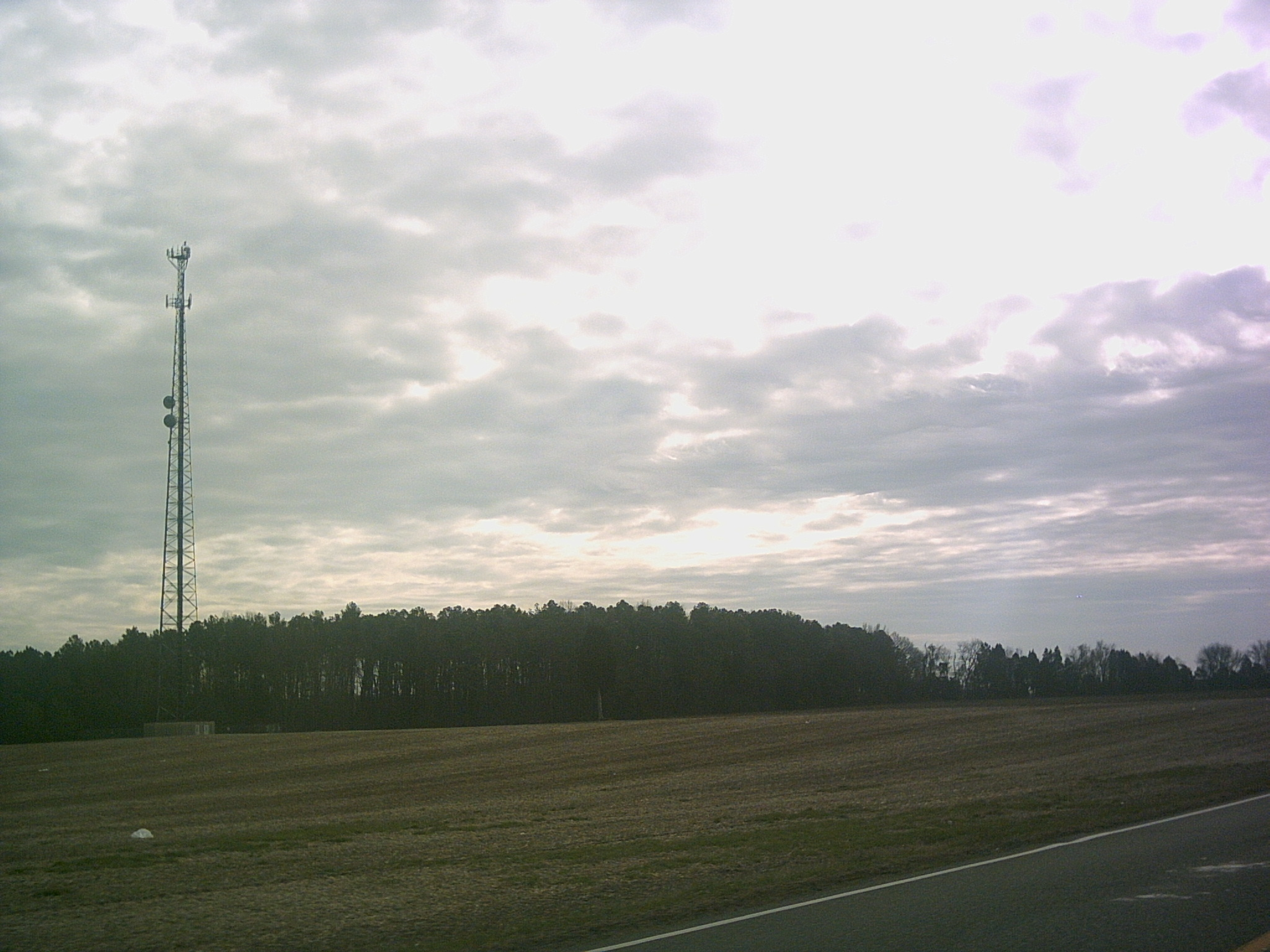
Rural scene in Richmond County

=== Town ===
- Warsaw

=== Unincorporated communities ===
- Farnham
- Foneswood
- Haynesville
- Lyells
- Rich Neck
- Sharps,
- Village
- Newland

Germans Corner another locality name in the county. It is about 1.5 miles north of Naylors Beach, at the junction of Virginia State Route 636 and Virginia State Route 624. It is named from Wilber L. Jerman, who built a large dwelling at the location in 1923, and lived there until 1946. Jerman's wife Cleva May was deeded 50 acres extending from the south and west of the corner from her father in 1920. Over time the original "Jerman's Corner" has come to be misspelled and known as "German's Corner."

== Politics ==
United States presidential election results for Richmond County, Virginia
Year	Republican		Democratic		Third party(ies)	
Year	No.	%	No.	%	No.	%
1912	110	22.36%	342	69.51%	40	8.13%
1916	180	35.36%	329	64.64%	0	0.00%
1920	206	39.09%	321	60.91%	0	0.00%
1924	125	26.54%	340	72.19%	6	1.27%
1928	467	61.53%	292	38.47%	0	0.00%
1932	192	29.14%	461	69.95%	6	0.91%
1936	217	32.49%	451	67.51%	0	0.00%
1940	257	34.68%	475	64.10%	9	1.21%
1944	336	47.93%	364	51.93%	1	0.14%
1948	296	48.13%	240	39.02%	79	12.85%
1952	727	68.91%	326	30.90%	2	0.19%
1956	761	67.89%	274	24.44%	86	7.67%
1960	801	64.96%	425	34.47%	7	0.57%
1964	901	58.51%	636	41.30%	3	0.19%
1968	1,011	48.86%	490	23.68%	568	27.45%
1972	1,565	77.55%	435	21.56%	18	0.89%
1976	1,391	60.80%	864	37.76%	33	1.44%
1980	1,567	62.81%	854	34.23%	74	2.97%
1984	1,869	68.46%	830	30.40%	31	1.14%
1988	1,862	66.24%	924	32.87%	25	0.89%
1992	1,609	52.75%	1,034	33.90%	407	13.34%
1996	1,424	50.91%	1,101	39.36%	272	9.72%
2000	1,784	60.50%	1,076	36.49%	89	3.02%
2004	2,082	61.95%	1,243	36.98%	36	1.07%
2008	2,092	55.86%	1,618	43.20%	35	0.93%
2012	2,160	57.29%	1,574	41.75%	36	0.95%
2016	2,213	60.45%	1,347	36.79%	101	2.76%
2020	2,547	62.09%	1,513	36.88%	42	1.02%
2024	2,697	64.71%	1,439	34.52%	32	0.77%

== Notable people ==
- Annie R. Blount (1839–unknown), poet, short story writer, and newspaper editor

== See also ==
- National Register of Historic Places listings in Richmond County, Virginia
