= Dragon Swamp =

Swamp-fed stream in Virginia

Coordinates: 37°34′04″N 76°34′30″W

Dragon Swamp, also known as Dragon Run, is a 36.7-mile-long (59.1 km) stream in the U.S. state of Virginia, flowing through King and Queen, Essex, Middlesex, and Gloucester counties. It is the main freshwater tributary of the Piankatank River.

== See also ==
- Dragon Run watershed
