= Dragon Run watershed =

Natural wetland in Virginia

Coordinates: 37°34′3.50″N 76°34′29.83″W

The Dragon Run watershed in the U.S. state of Virginia encompasses 140 square miles (360 km^{2}) and is home to many flora and fauna species. The brackish water stream, labeled on topographic maps as Dragon Swamp, is fed by underground springs, surface runoff, and numerous feeding swamps. In a study of 232 rivers and streams in the Chesapeake Bay, the Nature Conservancy and the Chesapeake Bay Foundation found the Dragon Run to rank second in terms of ecological significance. Efforts are being made to preserve the Dragon Run, including Governor Tim Kaine’s large purchase of land in order to maintain and protect the watershed’s original state.

== History ==
The earliest record of the Dragon Run is by Captain John Smith in 1607. While on his way to meet with the Powhatan and Pocahontas, he crossed the stream and marked it on a map. Later, many settlers came from England to settle in Virginia. Some settled in the Dragon Run watershed, and descendants of those original settlers still own land there today.

The area was noted as “Dragon Swamp” in 1673 by cartographer Augustine Herman. It is believed that the Pamunkeys used the swamp as a hiding spot during Bacon's Rebellion. John Clayton studied the area in 1773 and found over 800 species of native plant species, discovering two new species: Claytonia virginica and Osmunda claytoniana. The John Clayton Herbarium can still be found in London's Natural History Museum, including plants from the Dragon Run.

During the American Civil War, County Clerk P.T. Woodward reportedly prevented important Confederate documents from falling into Union hands by hiding them on an island in the Dragon Run.

More recently, brothers James V. Morgan and Harvey B. Morgan have taken a stand in preserving the watershed by organizing the Friends of the Dragon Run. Morgan took the lead in preservation by buying some of the land and building canoe trails for people to explore.

== Geography ==
Dragon Run Swamp is located in four counties in the Virginia Middle Peninsula encompassing a total of 140 square miles (90,000 acres). These counties are Essex, King & Queen, Middlesex, and Gloucester. The Dragon Run flows into the Piankatank River.

== Flora and fauna ==
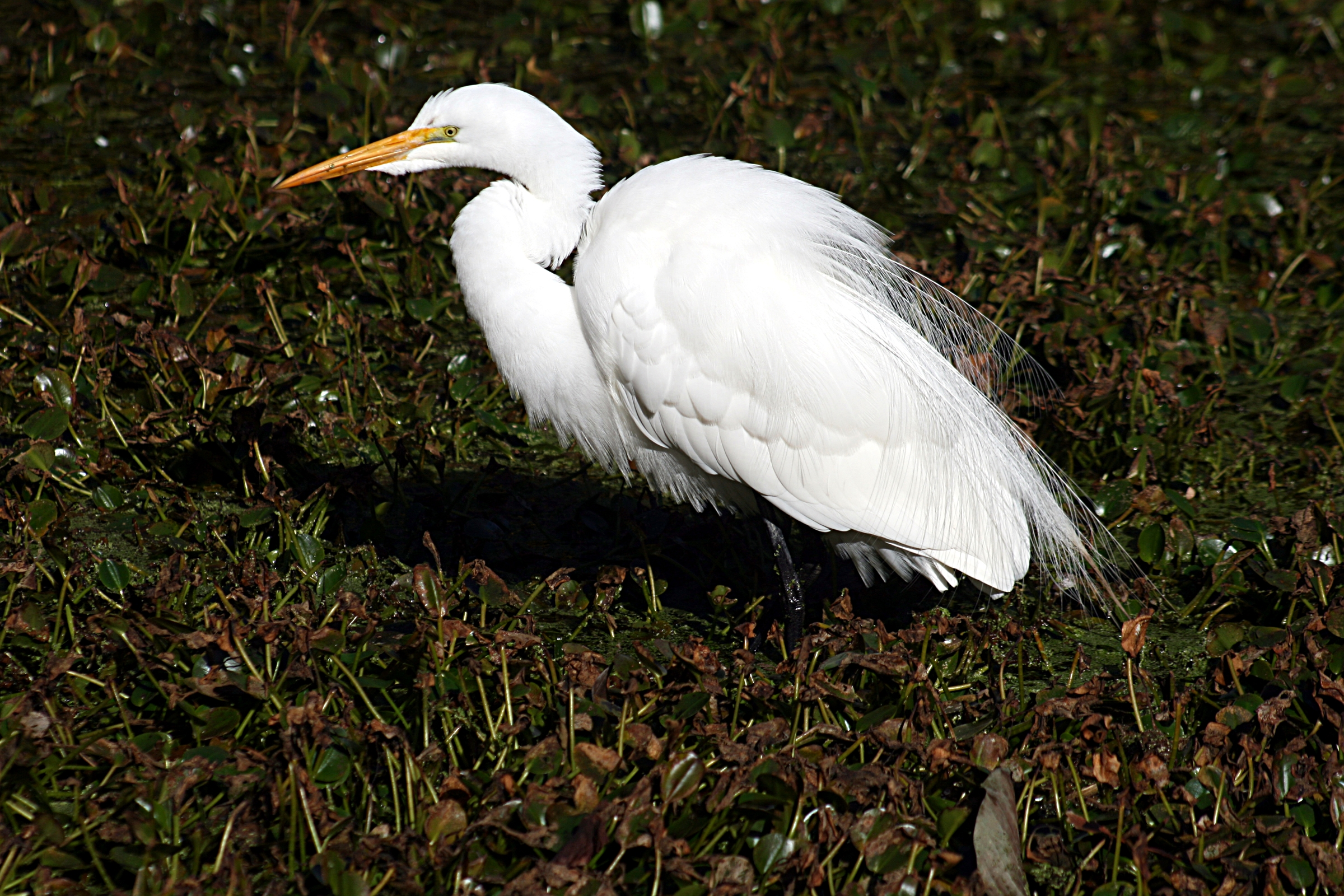
Egret

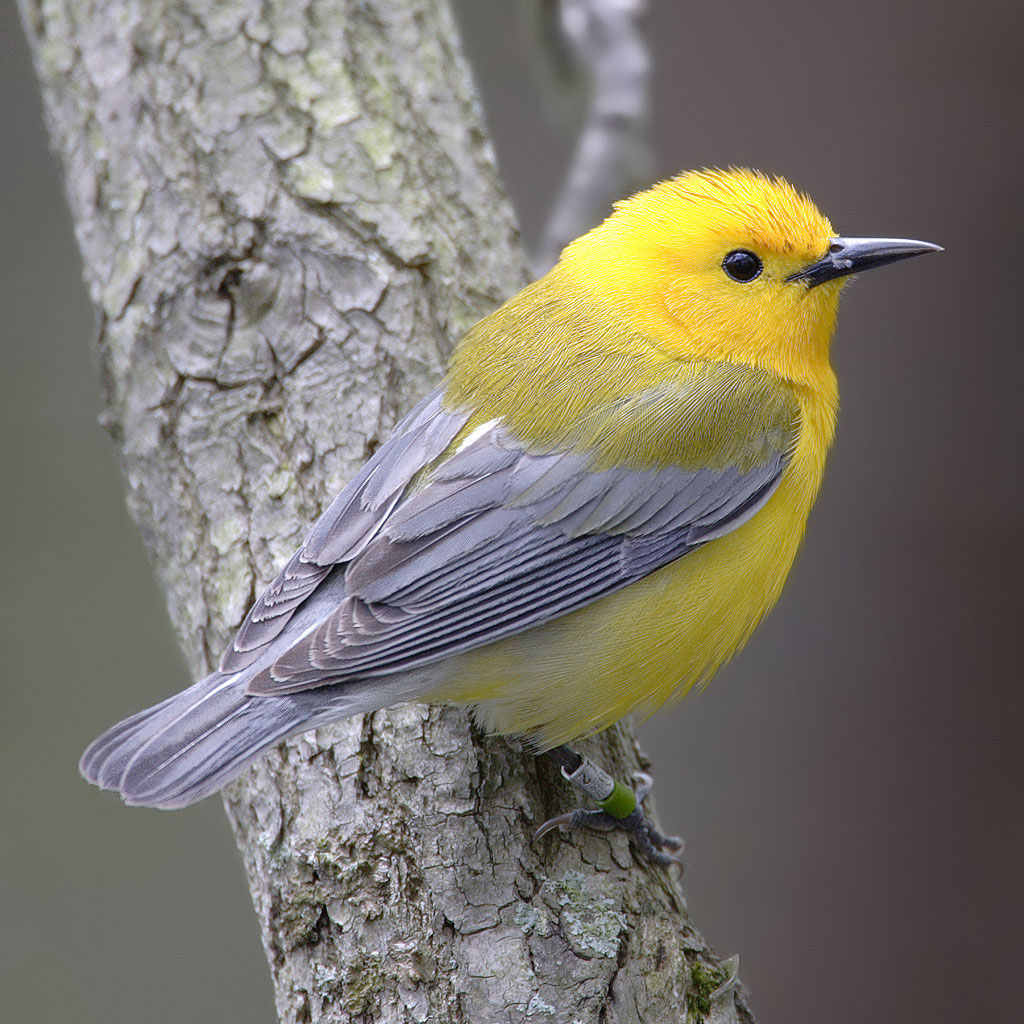
Prothonotary warbler

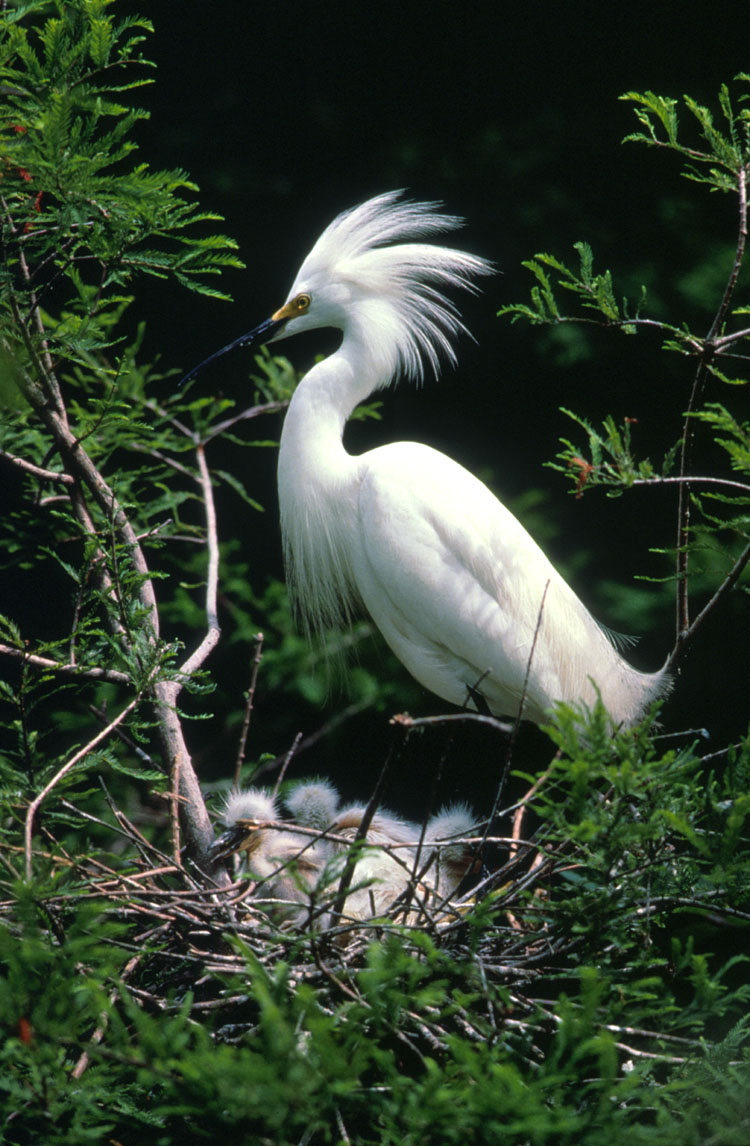
Heron

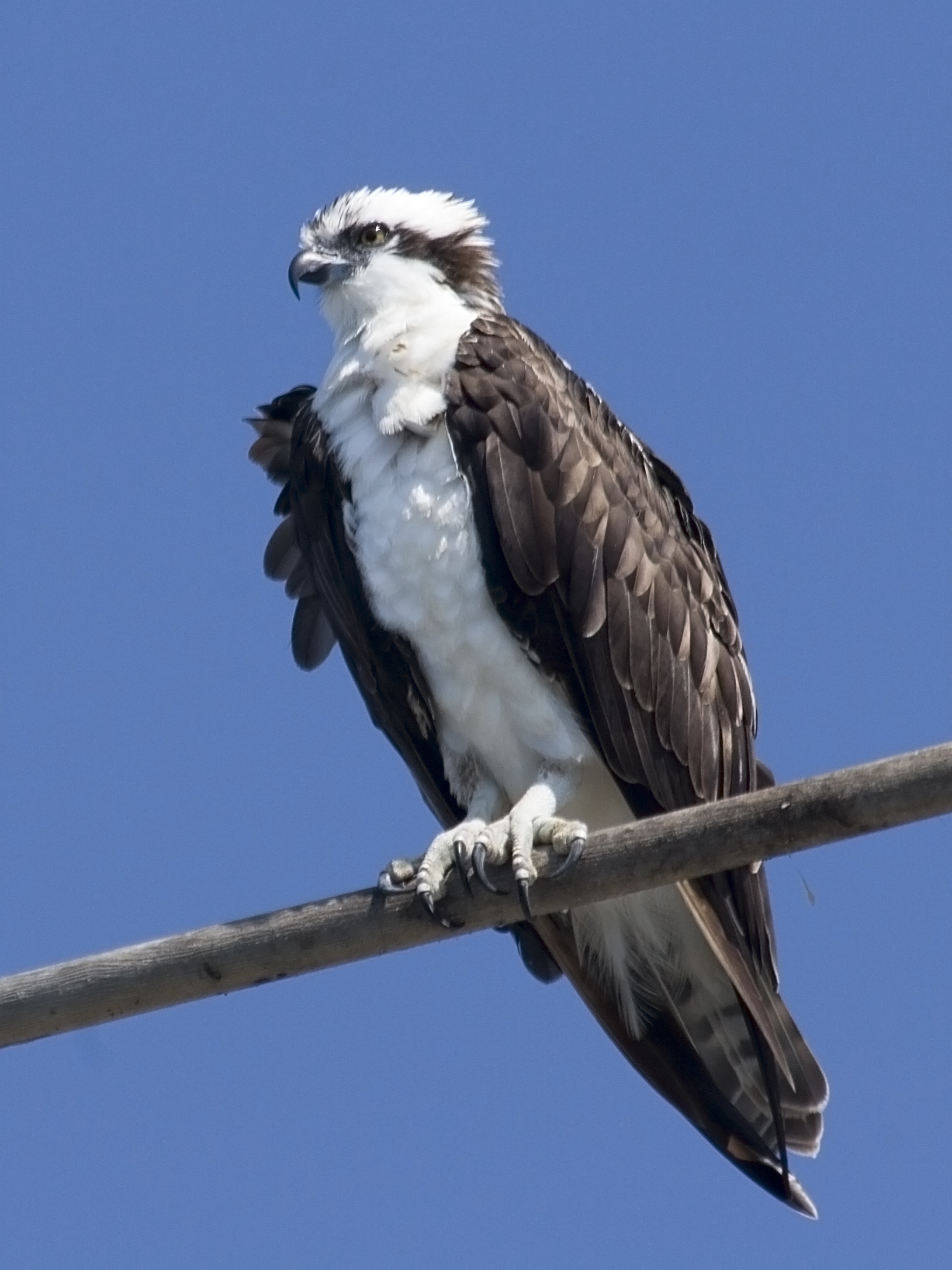
Osprey

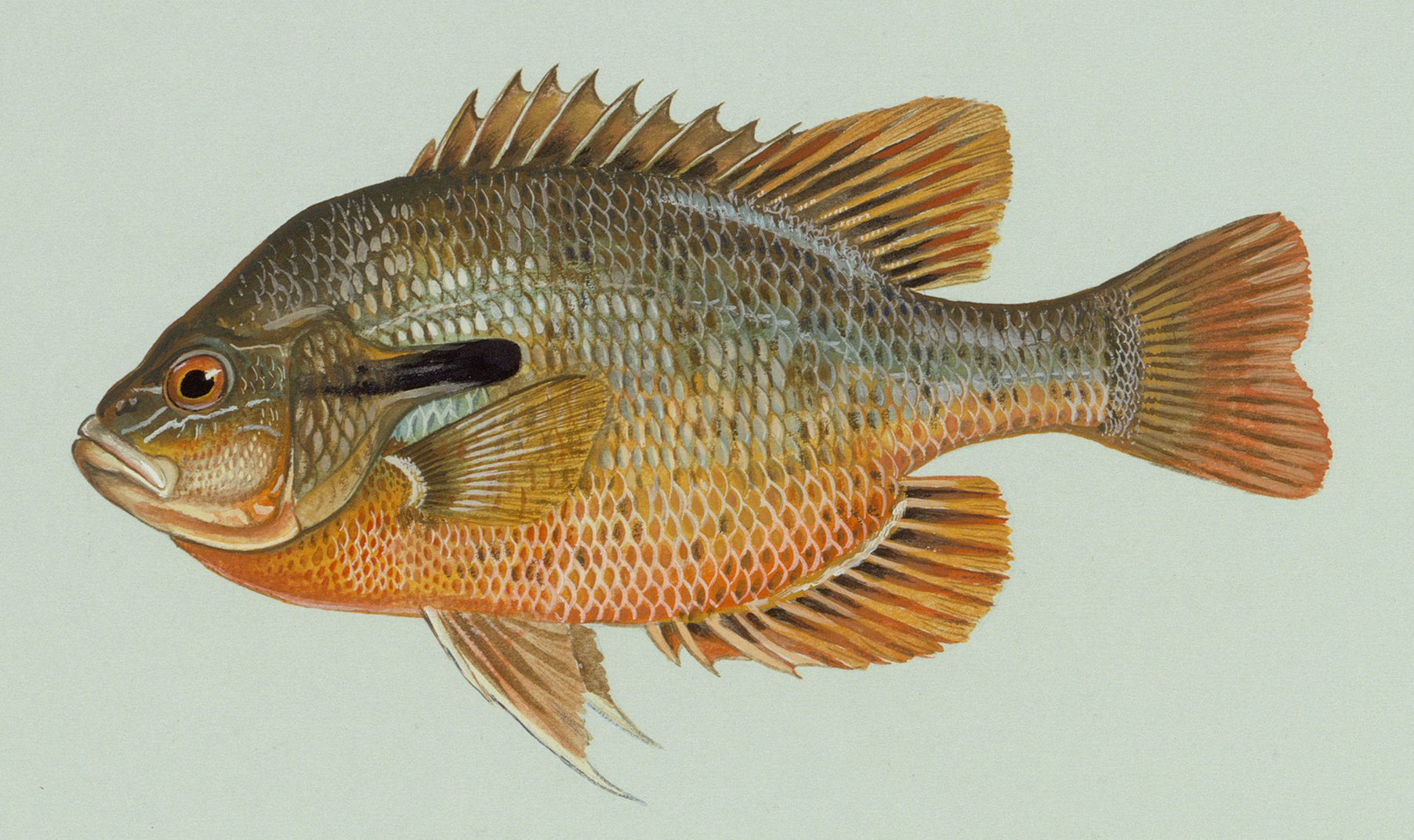
Redbreast sunfish

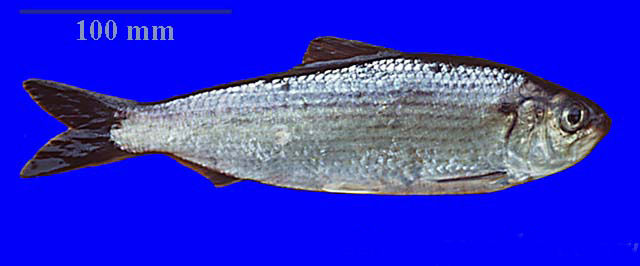
Alewife herring

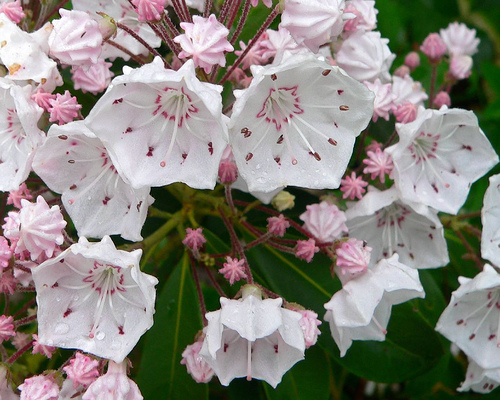
Mountain laurel

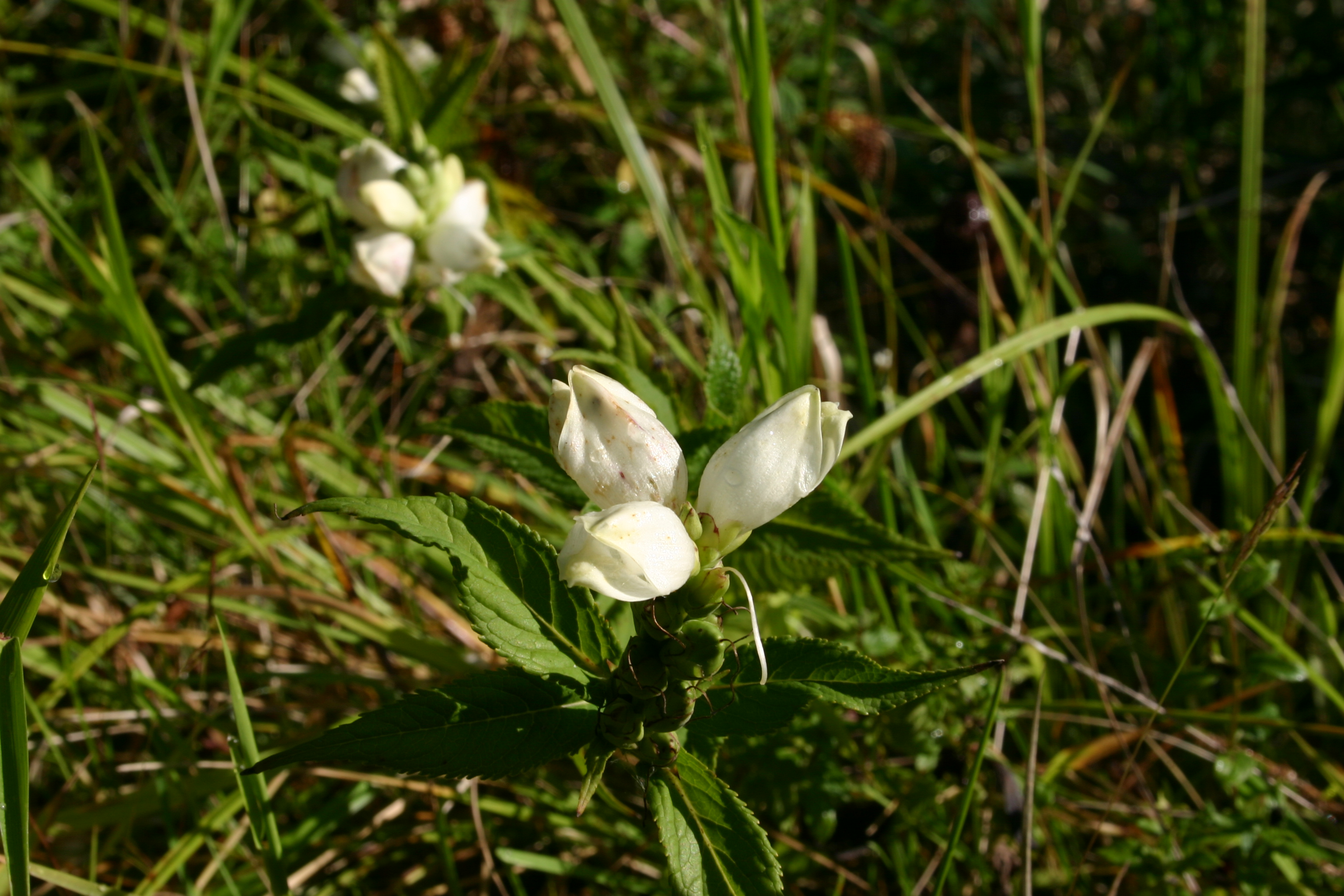
Turtlehead

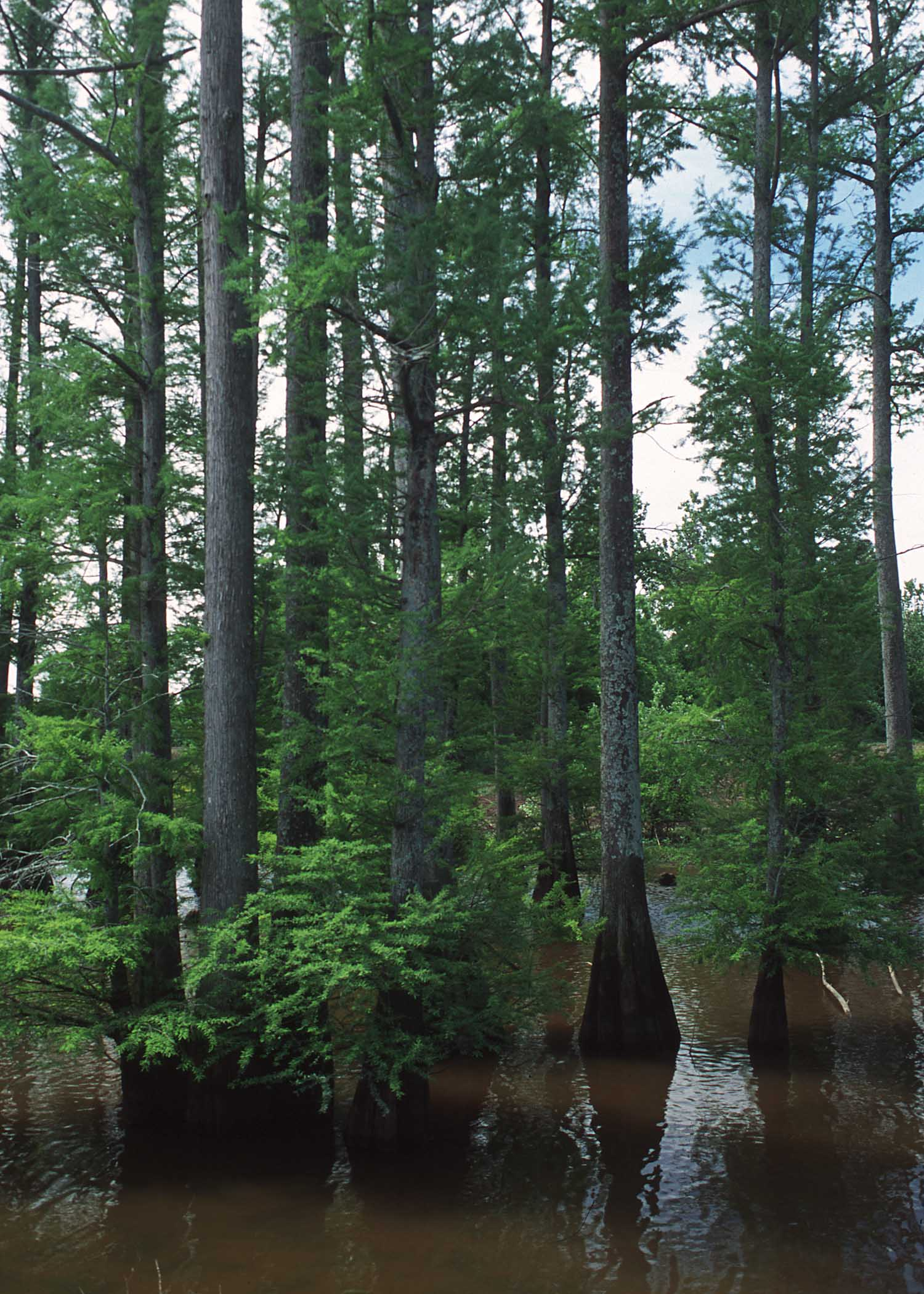
Bald cypress

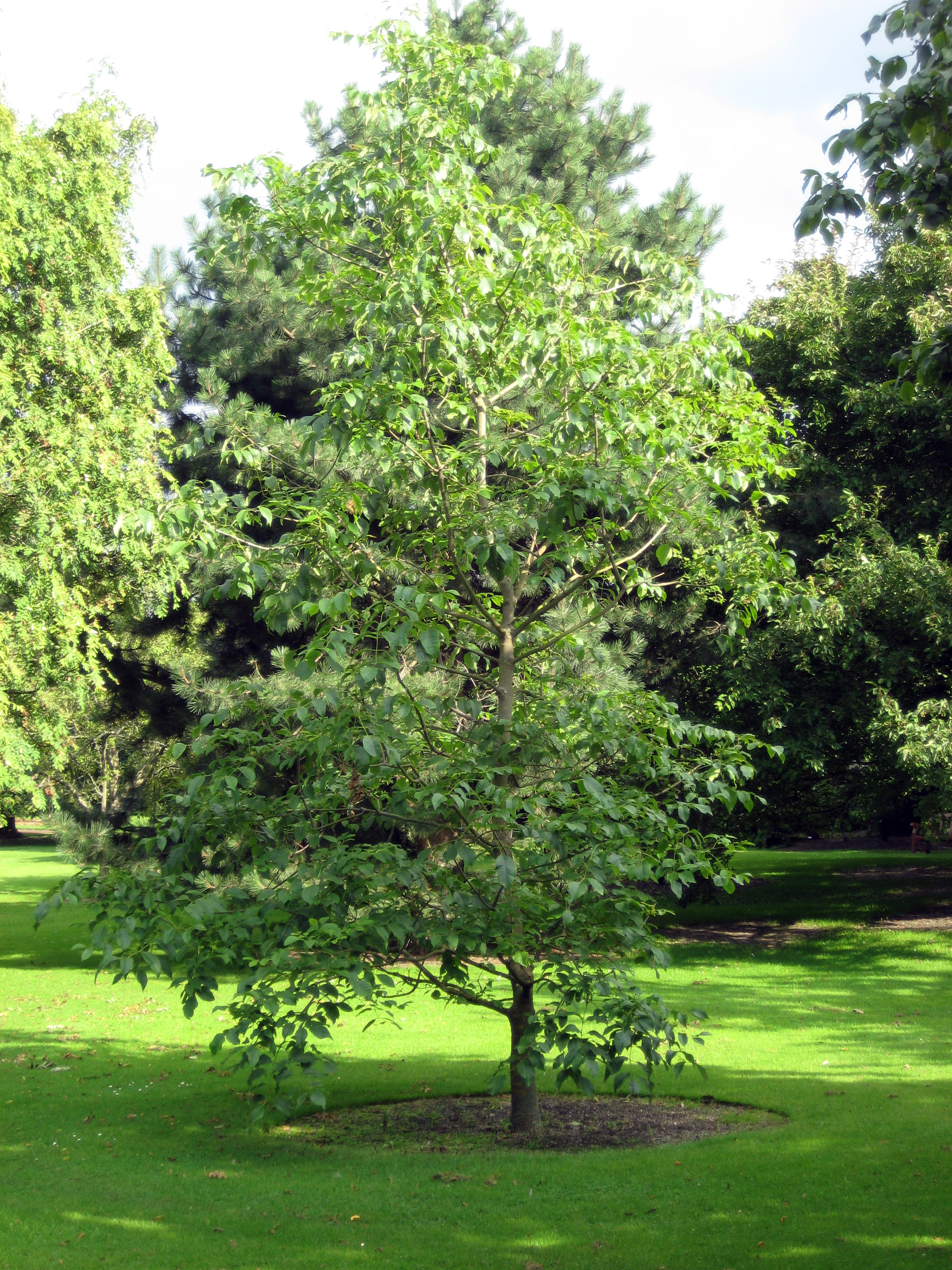
Pumpkin ash (Fraxinus profunda)

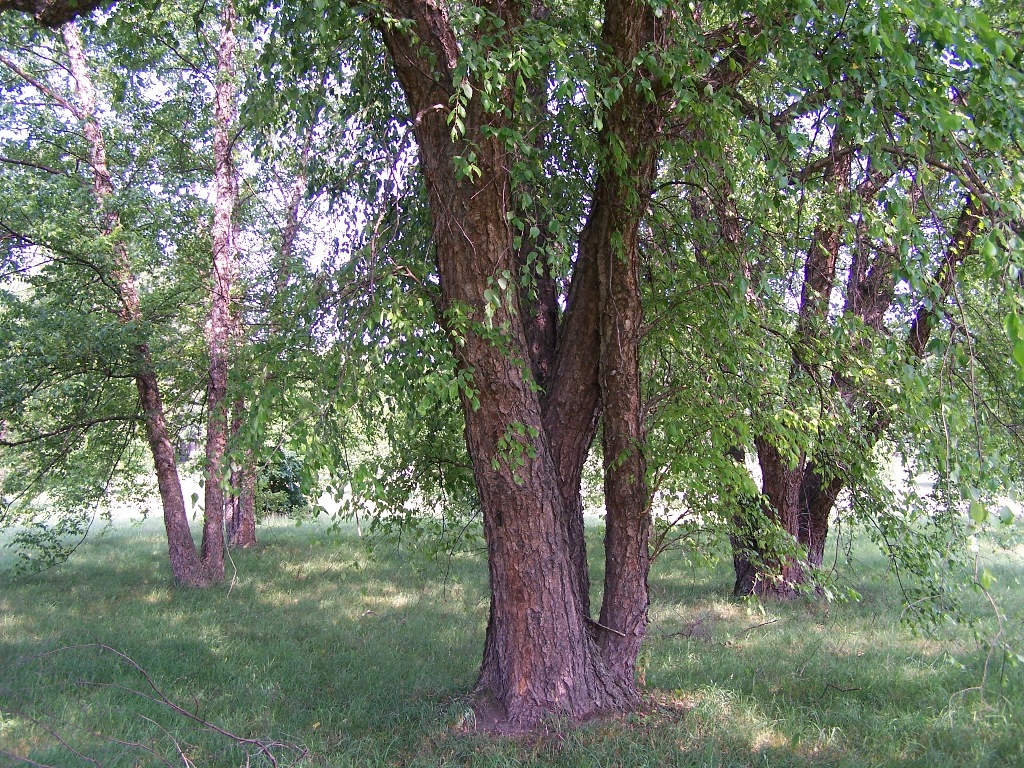
River birch

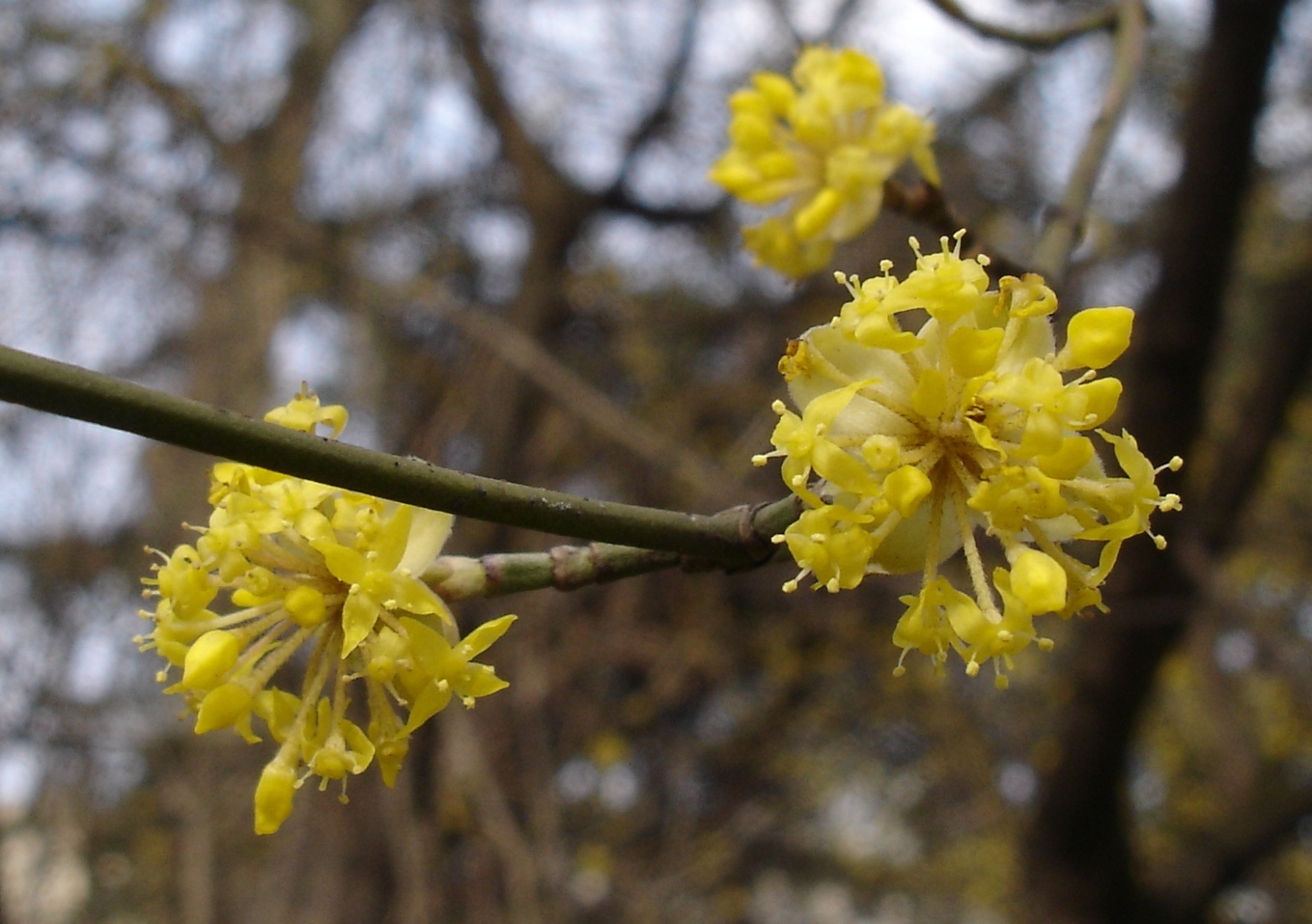
Dogwood

The Dragon Run Swamp is home to many fish species. Near the source the Dragon Run there are chain pickerel, warmouth sunfish, bowfin, redbreast sunfish, and white catfish. The lower river is filled with migratory fish that only come into the area in the spring to spawn such as American shad, hickory shad, alewife herring, blueback herring, and striped bass. Other fish that reside in the lower section are channel catfish, white catfish, chain pickerel, largemouth bass, several varieties of sunfish, yellow perch, and white perch.

The Dragon Run also houses rookeries for egrets and herons.

The Dragon run is also abundant with flora. This masterpiece created by nature boasts violets (Viola sp.), turtlehead, mountain laurel, wild Iris (plant), cardinal flowers (Lobelia cardinalis), royal ferns (Osmunda spectabilis), pawpaw, shad bushes (Amelanchier sp.), wild plum, mistletoe, old man's beard (Usnea sp.), bullhead lilies, pickerel weeds (Pontederia sp.), wild rice, duck potatoes (Sagittaria sp.), and cattails. The swamp is a heavily timbered area with pumpkin ash, gum, sycamore, river birch, red maple, dogwood, and huge bald cypress trees adorning every twist and turn the river takes.

== Preservation ==
Many efforts have been put into place to preserve and protect the Dragon Run watershed. Under Governor Tim Kaine, Virginia and The Nature Conservancy purchased 4,188 acres (16.95 km^{2}) of the Dragon Run in order to conserve it and protect its wildlife.

Friends of the Dragon Run are local citizens who donate money and time to help preserve the natural state of the swamp. They have purchased a 203-acre (0.82 km^{2}) tract of the swampland and work to manage the area and its natural environment. Friends of the Dragon Run encourage the use of no-till farming, filter strips, reforestation, contour plowing, and sensitive timbering techniques in and around the Dragon Run.

== See also ==
- Dragon Swamp
