= 1695 Essex Witch Trial =

Trial in Virginia, US

Ann Ball v. Ellinor Morris of King & Queen Co. (1695) was one of the few landmark sorcery cases in Essex County history that was likely inspired by the fears brought on by Salem witch trials in Massachusetts. The late 17th Century trial stemmed from two legal actions: the first being allegations of witchcraft made by Ann Ball against Ellinor Morris, and the second was a defamation lawsuit filed by the Morrises to restore Ellinor's reputation. However, unlike the Salem trials, the case was treated as a civil matter; perhaps due to the elevated social class Eillinor and William Morris enjoyed as a planter.

== Accusation of Witchcraft ==
The case began in April 1695 when Ann Ball accused Ellinor Morris of sorcery after Ann became sick with an unknown illness. On 10 June 1695 the trial commenced where Ann Ball in open-court accused Ellinor Wale Morris, wife of William Morris of witchcraft. Ann claimed that Ellinor had "bewitched her" and "ridden her several days and nights almost to death." These accusations were made publicly, and "declaring in a very loud voice that Eleanor had been and still was a witch' in New Kent County" in King & Queen County (formerly New Kent), where Ellinor had lived for approximately thirty years. On 11 June, the jury acquitted Ellinor and found Ball guilty of defamation.

== Defamation Suit: Morris v. Ball ==
Essex County, Virginia Court Records (formerly encompassing parts of King & Queen Co and New Kent) Order Book 1692-1695 recorded the action against Ann Ball and her husband William following the not-verdict of Ellinor Morris. The Morrises demanded 5,000 pounds of tobacco to be paid in damages. The jury ultimately found Ann Ball guilty of defamation and to paid a reduced charge of 500 pounds of tobacco.

"William Morris and Ellinor his wife complain against William Ball and Ann his wife for that, that is to say, the complainant Ellinor Morris hath for this thirty years or thereabout now past lived in New Kent County, now King and Queen County within this Colony of Virginia: and it is and hath been hitherto of good name, fame, credit and reputation and never was guilty of any conjuration, witchcraft, or enchantment, charm or sorcery or any other just act or acts whereby to hurt anybody in their lives, liberties, or estate but is and ever was free from all and every such like offenses and from any spot, blemish, or suspicion of them or any of them did always live and remain unspotted, which premises are very well known to these defendants.

William Ball and Ann his wife, yet she the said Ann Ball out of an evil intent and malicious design to deprive and destroy the good name, credit, and reputation of the complainants and to bring them into hatred and contempt did, to wit, on the 23rd day of April last or thereabouts and at divers times and places within this county in the presence and hearing of divers of their Majesties' liege people with a loud voice publicly and maliciously utter and declare these false, feigned, scandalous, and malicious words of the complainants (viz.) that the complainant Ellinor Morris was and is a witch and she had bewitched her, the defendant, and had ridden her several days and nights almost to death that of her life she did despair and said that she would prove it with many other false words and scandalous speeches against the complainants' good name, credit, and reputation to their damage of five thousand pounds of tobacco and cask for which they prayed judgment with costs.

To which the defendants, by Mr. Thomas Grigson and Mr. Robert Coleman their attorneys appeared and for plea say not guilty in manner and form; whereupon the matter for trial is referred to a jury who (viz.) Robert Halsey, Richard Covington, Thomas Cockin, James Hinds, Edward Rowsie, Samuel Griffing, Thomas Davis, William Jones, John Williams, Nicholas Copeland, Robert Pley and Samuel Thacker, being sworn for verdict.

We the jury find for the plaintiffs five hundred pounds of tobacco damage, which (upon the plaintiffs' motion by James Boughan their attorney) is recorded and judgment granted the defendants for the said five hundred pounds of tobacco damage to be paid with costs."
