= Hardyville =

Hardyville may refer to:

- Hardyville, Arizona, a ghost town in Mohave County, currently within the city limits of Bullhead City
- Hardyville, California, former name of Hardy, California
- Hardyville, Kentucky
- Hardyville, Virginia
