= 1882 Atlantic hurricane season =

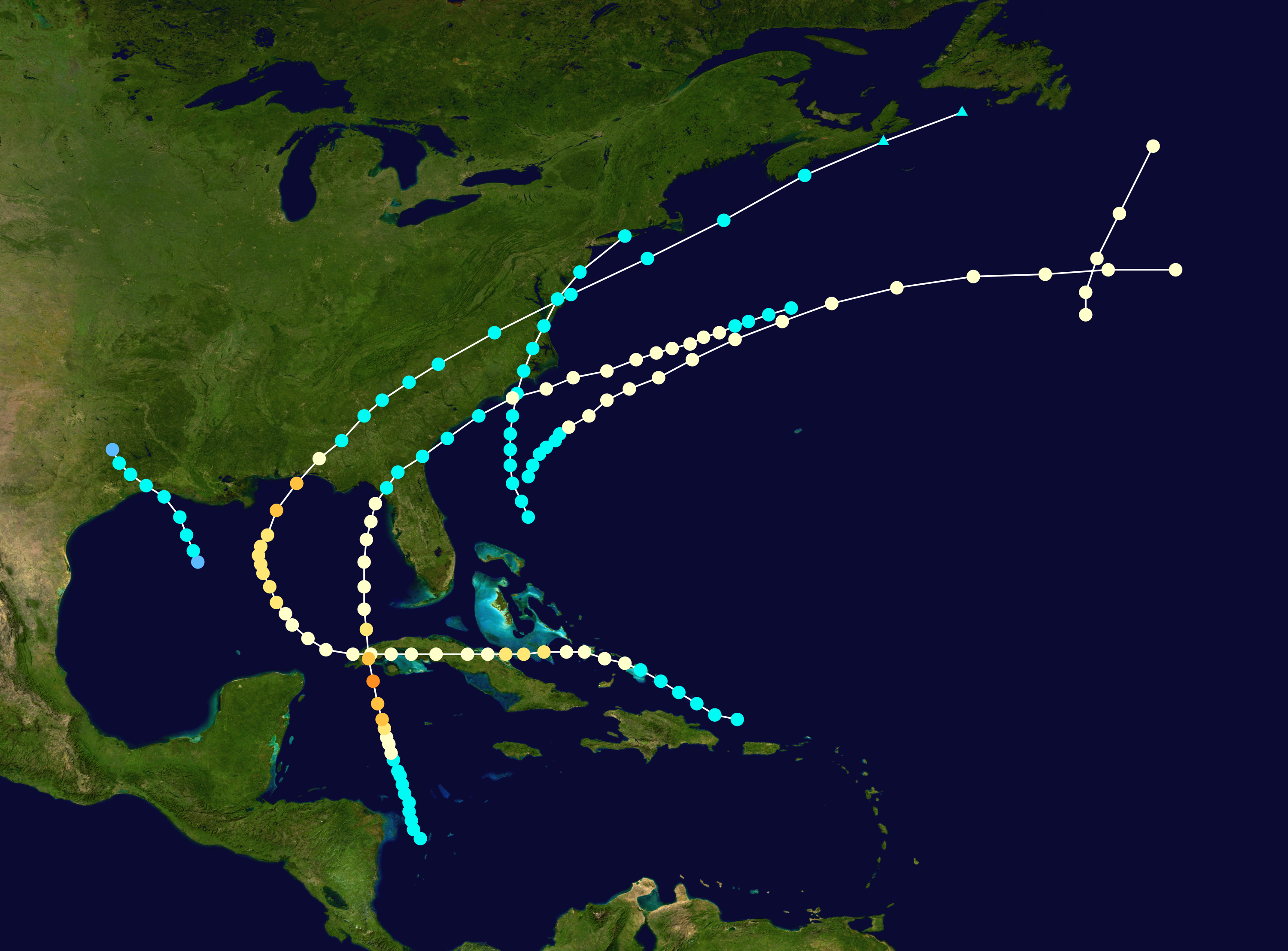
- Season summary map

Seasonal boundaries
- First system formed: August 24, 1882
- Last system dissipated: October 15, 1882

Strongest storm
- Name: Six
  - Maximum winds: 140 mph (220 km/h) (1-minute sustained)

Seasonal statistics
- Total storms: 6
- Hurricanes: 4
- Major hurricanes (Cat. 3+): 2
- Total fatalities: 140+
- Total damage: Unknown

The 1882 Atlantic hurricane season featured six tropical cyclones, four of which made landfall in the United States. Of the six tropical storms, four intensified into hurricanes, while two of those intensified into major hurricanes. (Note: A major hurricane is a storm that ranks as Category 3 or higher on the Saffir–Simpson hurricane wind scale.) However, in the absence of modern satellite and other remote-sensing technologies, only storms that affected populated land areas or encountered ships at sea were recorded, so the actual total could be higher. An undercount bias of zero to six tropical cyclones per year between 1851 and 1885.

The first system of the season is known to have been active as a hurricane in the north Atlantic on August 24 and August 25. September featured four cyclones, with two tropical storms and two hurricanes. One of them, the season's second storm, made landfall in the Bahamas, Cuba, and Florida at hurricane intensity. Fatalities were reported in Cuba. Later, the cyclone caused approximately $100,000 in damage (1882 USD) on Cedar Key, Florida, alone, (Note: All damage figures are in 1882 USD, unless otherwise noted) while a tornado in the state killed one person. In October, the sixth, final, and strongest storm of the season struck western Cuba as a Category 4 hurricane on the present-day Saffir–Simpson scale, destroying or damaging thousands of buildings and homes. At least $5,000 in damage occurred in North Florida after making landfall on the state's west coast. Throughout its path, this storm caused 140 deaths prior to being last noted north of Bermuda on October 15.

Of the known 1882 cyclones, meteorologists José Fernández-Partagás and Henry Diaz first documented the first and fifth systems in 1996, while the third cyclone was recognized in 1997 and added to official database (HURDAT) in 2003. Fernández-Partagás and Diaz also proposed large changes to the known track of second system while further re-analysis, in 2000, led to the peak strengths of both second and sixth storm being increased. In 2011, the third storm of the year was downgraded from a hurricane to a tropical storm. More recently, climate researcher Michael Chenoweth authored a reanalysis study, published in 2014, which concluded that the 1882 season featured a total of ten tropical cyclones, with the addition of four previously undocumented storms. Chenoweth also proposed some alterations to the track and intensity of each storm, but these changes have yet to be incorporated into HURDAT.

== Season summary ==
The Atlantic hurricane database (HURDAT) recognizes six tropical cyclones for the 1882 season. Of the six systems, four intensified into a hurricane, two of which strengthened into a major hurricane. José Fernández-Partagás and Henry F. Diaz first documented the one and fifth systems in their 1996 re-analysis of the season. while the third storm was first recognized in 1997 and added to HURDAT in 2003. Fernández-Partagás and Diaz also proposed large changes to the known track of the second cyclone while further re-analysis, in 2000, led to the peak strengths of both second and sixth being increased. In 2011, the Atlantic hurricane reanalysis project downgraded the third system from a hurricane to a tropical storm. A reanalysis by climate researcher Michael Chenoweth, published in 2014, adds six storms. Chenoweth's study utilizes a more extensive collection of newspapers and ship logs, as well as late 19th century weather maps for the first time, in comparison to previous reanalysis projects. However, Chenoweth's proposals have yet to be incorporated into HURDAT.

The first system of the season is known, from ship reports, to have been active in the north Atlantic to the southeast of Atlantic Canada on August 24 and August 25. September featured four cyclones, with two tropical storms and two hurricanes. One of them, the season's second storm, struck the Bahamas, Cuba, and Florida at hurricane intensity. Fatalities were reported in Cuba.. Later, the storm caused $100,000 in damage in Cedar Key, Florida, alone, while a tornado in the state killed one person. The season's third system inflicted some damage at Sabine Pass, Texas, and the fourth cyclone flooded the East Coast of the United States from North Carolina to Massachusetts. In October, the sixth, final, and strongest storm of the season made landfall in western Cuba at peak intensity as a Category 4 hurricane with maximum sustained winds of 140 mph (220 km/h). Thousands of buildings and homes were damaged or destroyed. At least $5,000 in damage occurred in North Florida after the storm struck the Nature Coast as a hurricane. Overall, the cyclone, which was last noted on October 15, killed 140 people.

The season's activity was reflected with an accumulated cyclone energy (ACE) rating of 59, ahead of only 1885 and tied with 1881 for the lowest total of the 1880s. ACE is a metric used to express the energy used by a tropical cyclone during its lifetime. Therefore, a storm with a longer duration will have higher values of ACE. It is only calculated at six-hour increments in which specific tropical and subtropical systems are either at or above sustained wind speeds of 39 mph (63 km/h), which is the threshold for tropical storm intensity.

== Systems ==
=== Hurricane One ===
- Category 1 hurricane (SSHWS)
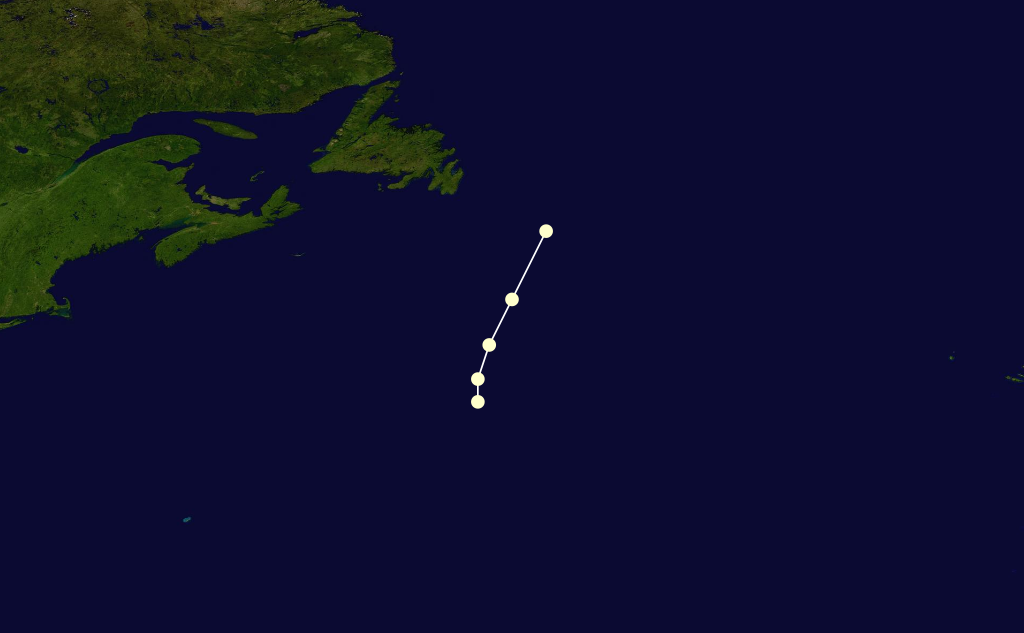
- Duration: August 24 – August 25
- Peak intensity: 80 mph (130 km/h) (1-min);

Based on reports from two ships, the Will W. Case and Ida, a hurricane was active on August 24 in the North Atlantic. Consequently, the Atlantic hurricane database begins the official track about 600 mi (965 km) southeast of Sable Island, Nova Scotia, with maximum sustained winds of 80 mph (130 km/h). Its prior track is unknown, but the storm continued to the north-northeast and was last noted on August 25 approximately 225 mi (360 km) southeast of Cape Race, Newfoundland. Climate researcher Michael Chenoweth proposed that this storm developed as a tropical depression north of Bermuda on August 20. The system ended up farther west than shown in HURDAT, becoming extratropical south of Newfoundland on August 24.

=== Hurricane Two ===
- Category 3 hurricane (SSHWS)
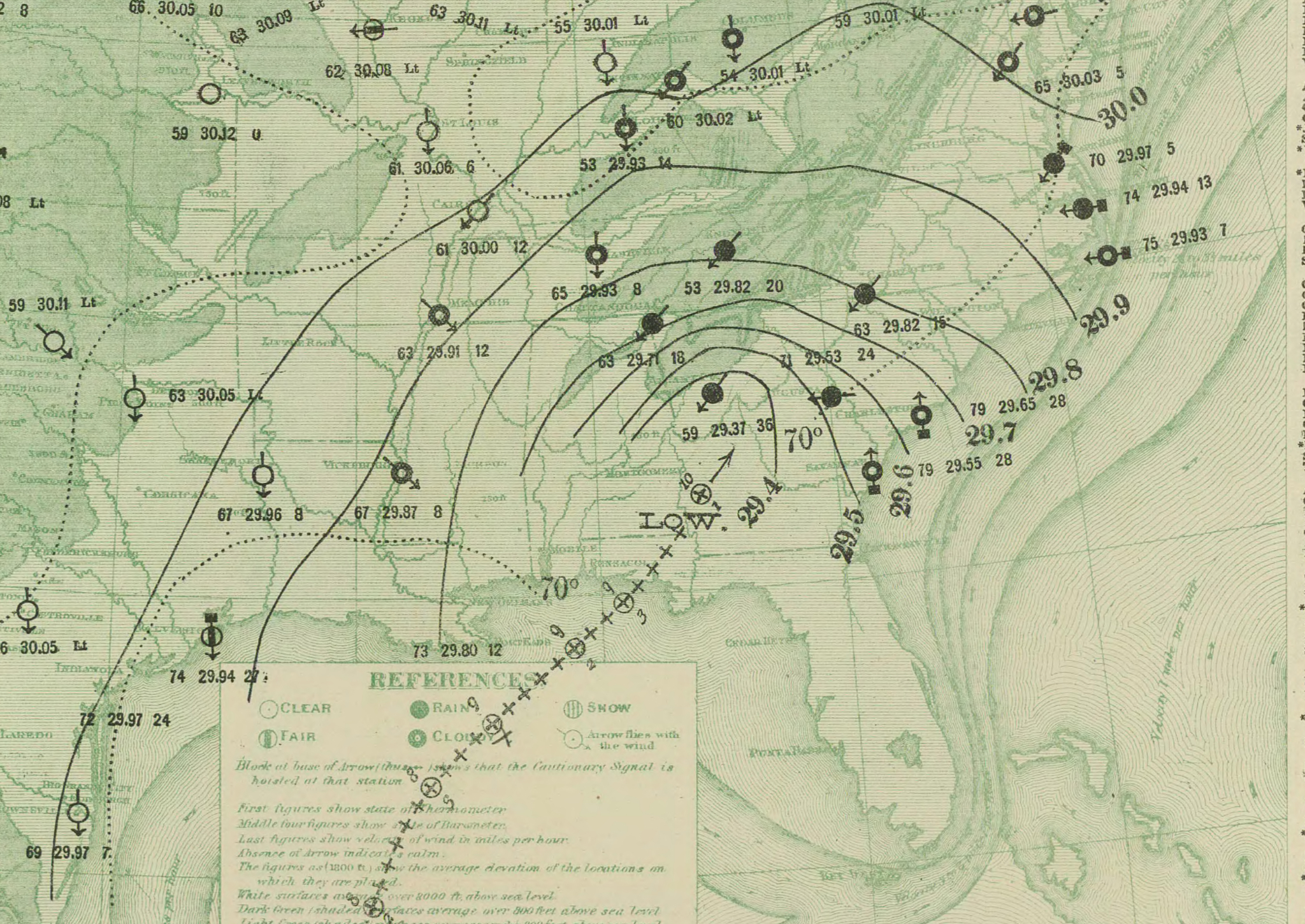
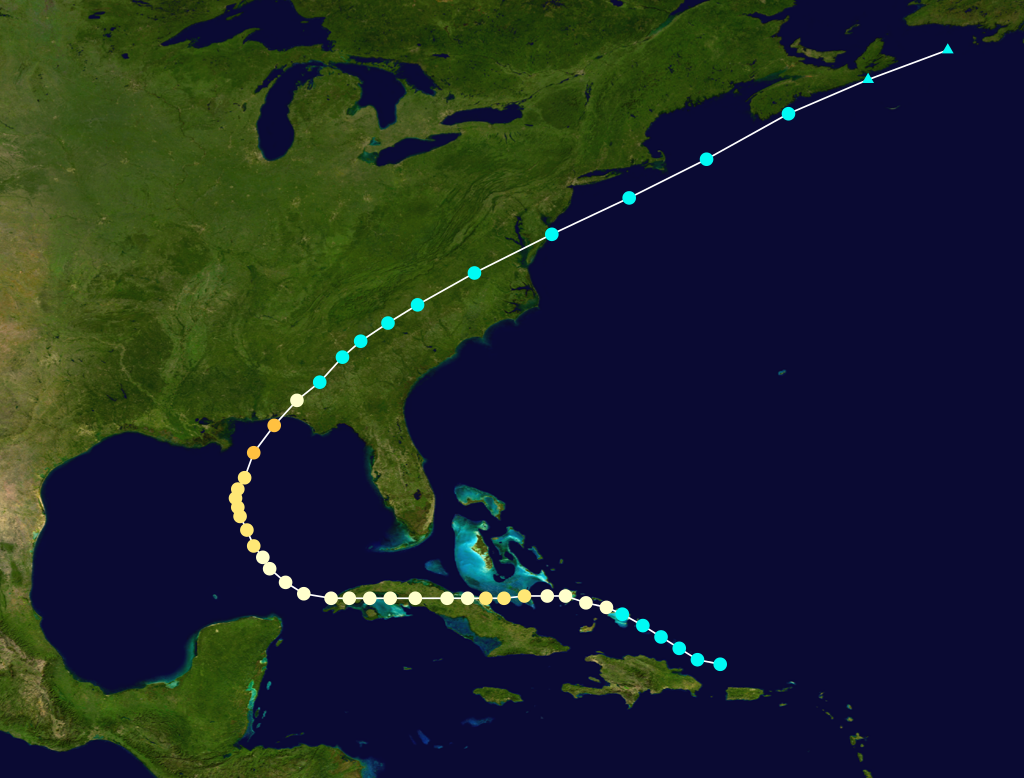
- Duration: September 2 – September 12
- Peak intensity: 125 mph (205 km/h) (1-min); 949 mbar (hPa)

The Turks and Caicos Islands first reported this cyclone on September 2, with the official track initiated about 70 mi (115 km) northwest of Puerto Rico, though Chenoweth's study indicates that this storm formed north of the Virgin Islands as a tropical depression on September 1, Moving west-northward, the cyclone struck the Turks and Caicos Islands as a strong tropical storm early on September 3, shortly before strengthening into a hurricane. The storm intensified into a Category 2 hurricane on the present-day Saffir–Simpson scale as it crossed through the southern Bahamas on September 4. Several hours later, the cyclone struck Cuba near Cayo Romano in Camagüey Province. The system weakened but maintained hurricane intensity as it moved westward across the island and emerged into the Gulf of Mexico on September 6, although the study by Chenoweth indicates that the storm crossed the north coast of the Yucatán Peninsula on September 7 before turning north over the Gulf of Mexico. Turning northwestward on the next day, the cyclone slowly re-intensified. By September 10, the storm turned northeastward and strengthened into a Category 3 hurricane with winds of 125 mph (205 km/h), based on the bark Cato recording a barometric pressure of 949 mbar (28.0 inHg). The hurricane made landfall near Navarre, Florida, around 02:00 UTC and weakened to a tropical storm about 10 hours later. Early on September 12, the cyclone emerged into the Atlantic at the Delmarva Peninsula and passed within 35 mi (55 km) of Nantucket, Massachusetts, around 09:00 UTC, but became extratropical several hours later near the east end of Nova Scotia.

In Cuba, the cities of Batabanó, Cienfuegos, and Havana observed high winds, including a sustained wind speed of 70 mph (110 km/h) at Cienfuegos. Santa Clara Province experienced "great damage", according to the Savannah Morning News. Sugarcane fields suffered mostly minor damage. The hurricane drove an American bark and a British schooner ashore at Cienfuegos. Simón Sarasola noted that the storm left a "buen numero de victimas" (English: "good number of victims"). Along the Gulf Coast of the United States, the hurricane devastated docks and warehouses from Louisiana to Apalachee Bay in Florida. In Louisiana, floodwaters destroyed approximately half of the rice crop in Plaquemines Parish, while the community of Quarantine also experienced flooding. The storm caused losses to cotton and timber crops and toppled fences in parts of Alabama and Georgia. Within Florida, shipping and buildings in Pensacola suffered damage. In Tallahassee, the storm unroofed a new hotel and some other buildings while also downing fences, outhouses, and trees. Approximately $100,000 in damage occurred in Cedar Key. Throughout many northern counties of Florida, the hurricane caused extensive crop losses. A tornado at Darbyville demolished a number of homes, caused one death, and injured many other people. Along the coast of North Carolina, agricultural and property damage, including the destruction of two homes in Topsail Beach. Heavy rains in Virginia washed out a portion of the Norfolk and Western Railway and damaged several Alexandria and Fredericksburg bridges. The cyclone toppled chimneys and trees as far north as Eastport, Maine.

=== Tropical Storm Three ===
- Tropical storm (SSHWS)
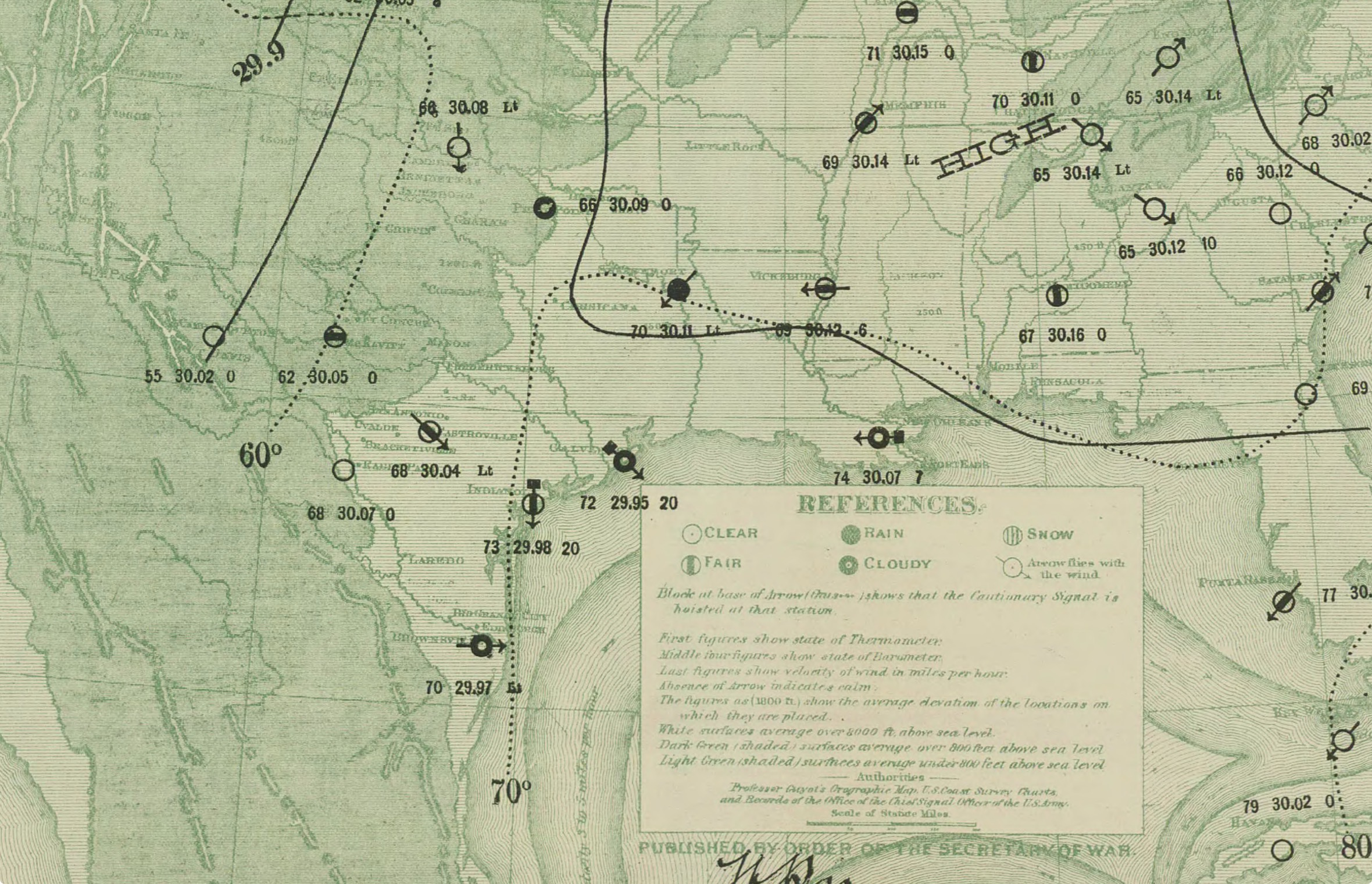
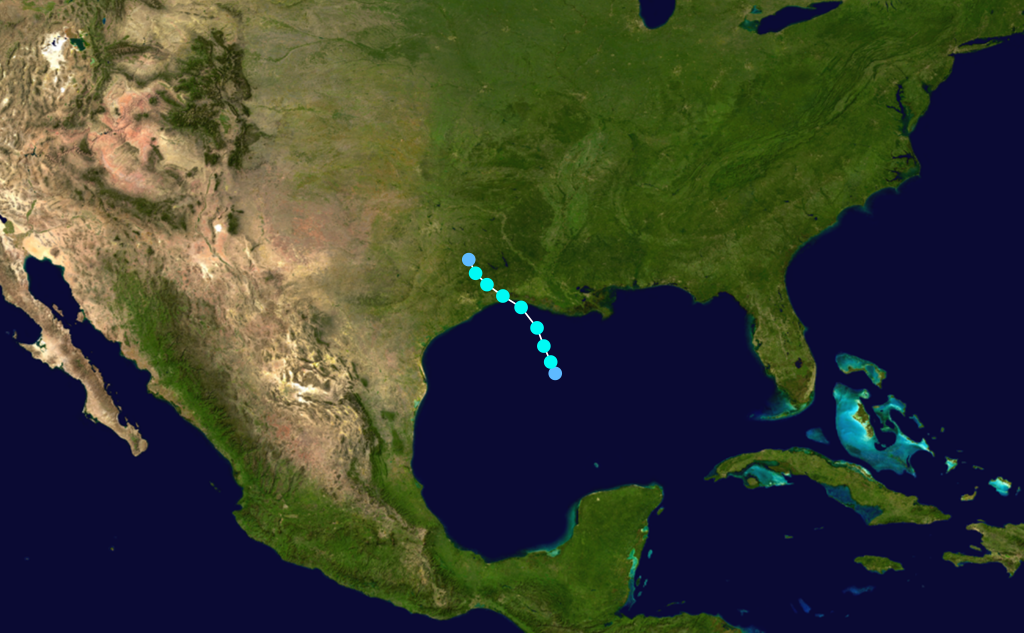
- Duration: September 14 – September 16
- Peak intensity: 60 mph (95 km/h) (1-min);

This storm was first observed at Lake Charles, Louisiana, and Sabine Pass, Texas, on September 14, although Chenoweth's study indicates that this system developed three days earlier over the Bay of Campeche. A tropical depression, it quickly strengthened into a tropical storm while moving northwestward. At 05:00 UTC on September 15, the storm made landfall just east of the Louisiana–Texas state line with maximum sustained winds estimated at 60 mph (95 km/h). Chenoweth's study places the location of landfall closer to Port Arthur, Texas. Early on September 16, the cyclone weakened to a tropical depression and dissipated near Grapeland, Texas.Port Eads, Louisiana, recorded winds of 70 mph (110 km/h) and a pressure of 995 mbar (29.38 inHg). In Sabine Pass, Texas, the storm flooded streets with about 3 ft (0.91 m) of water, toppled fences, and damaged some homes, with one destroyed, injuring its occupant. This storm was first added to HURDAT in 2003.

=== Tropical Storm Four ===
- Tropical storm (SSHWS)
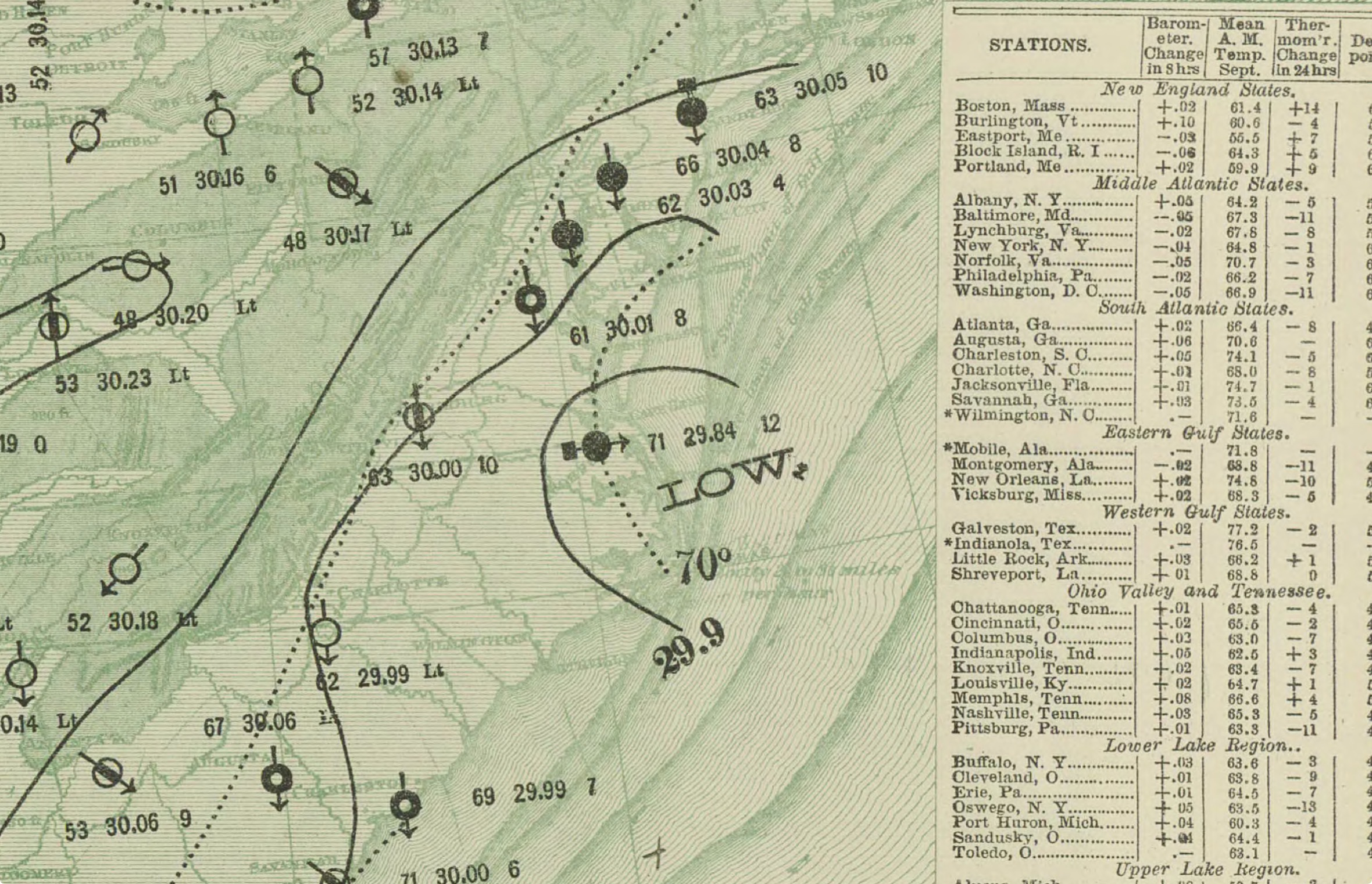
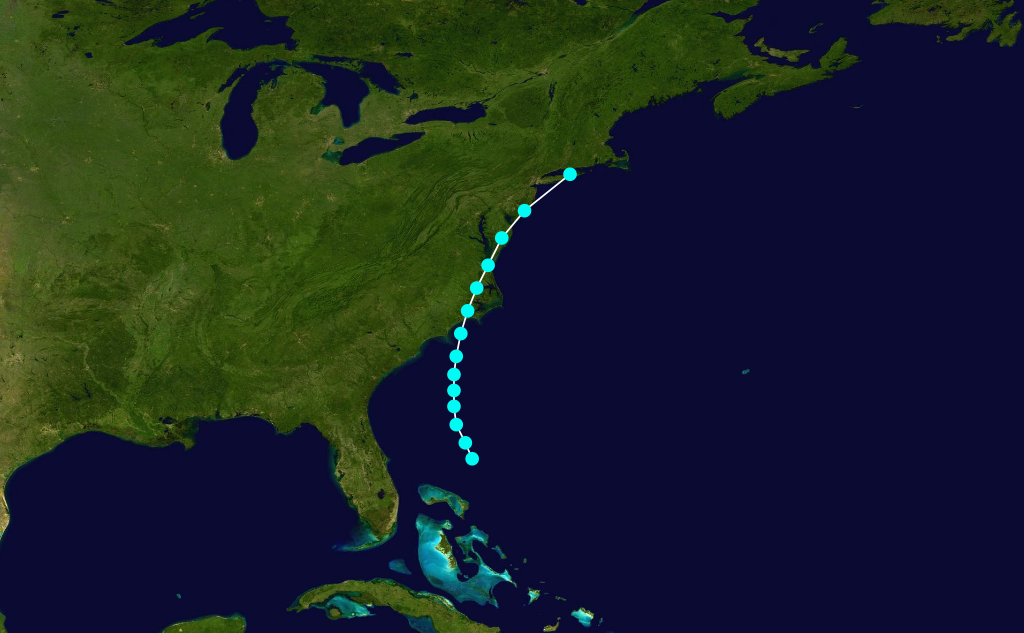
- Duration: September 21 – September 24
- Peak intensity: 60 mph (95 km/h) (1-min); 1005 mbar (hPa)

The Signal Service (the present-day National Weather Service) first detected this system northwest of the Bahamas on September 21. Moving generally northward, the cyclone struck near Emerald Isle, North Carolina, around 22:00 UTC the next day with winds of 60 mph (95 km/h). Early on September 23, the storm's pressure fell to 1,005 mbar (29.7 inHg) as it moved northeastward over northeastern North Carolina. Between later that day and early on September 24, the system crossed the Delmarva Peninsula, Delaware Bay, and New Jersey before re-emerging into the Atlantic. The cyclone then made landfall near Mastic Beach, New York, with winds of 60 mph (95 km/h) at 05:00 UTC on September 24 and was last observed crossing Long Island. Chenoweth proposed that this system only existed on September 22 and September 23 and made landfall slightly farther west in the North Carolina.

Portions of the East Coast of the United States from North Carolina to Massachusetts reported heavy rains, including around 11 in (280 mm) of rain to Philadelphia and a total of 10.62 in (270 mm) precipitation to Central Park in New York City on September 22–23. Consequently, one and two-day precipitation extremes were set at Central Park (1869–present being the period of record), including 8.28 in (210 mm) of precipitation on September 23. Additionally, Paterson, New Jersey, observed about 14 in (360 mm) of precipitation. Consequently, flooding carried away bridges, washed out or damaged railroad tracks, and inundated roads in several states. Near Wares Wharf on the Lower Rappahannock in Virginia, four mills were destroyed. Floodwaters also damaged many buildings and homes in New Jersey and New York, especially in Trenton in the former after a creek overflowed.

=== Hurricane Five ===
- Category 1 hurricane (SSHWS)
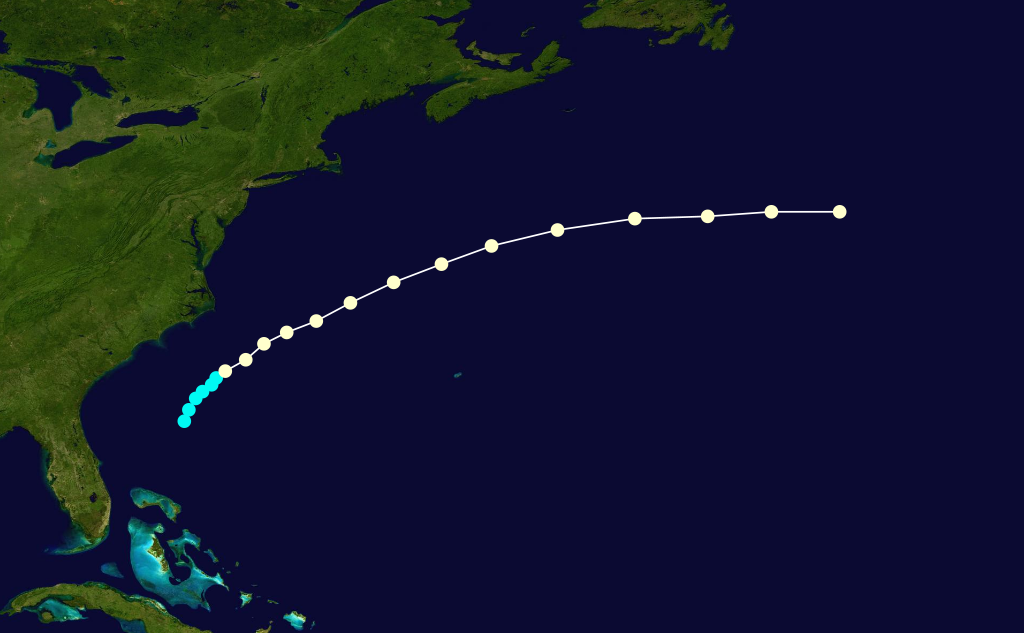
- Duration: September 24 – September 28
- Peak intensity: 80 mph (130 km/h) (1-min);

The brig Belle of the Bay encountered a severe gale north of the Bahamas on September 24. Consequently, the track listed in HURDAT begins that day as a tropical storm approximately 275 mi (445 km) east of Jacksonville, Florida. The storm moved slowly northeastward and intensified into a hurricane with maximum sustained winds of 80 mph (130 km/h) on September 25, based on reports from the ships R.A. Allen and Sedmi Dubrovacki. By September 27, the hurricane curved east-northeastward and was last seen on the following day roughly 555 mi (895 km) to the southeast of Cape Race, Newfoundland. The reanalysis study by Chenoweth argued that this storm instead formed over the central Atlantic on September 22. He also proposed that the system moved around Bermuda and later passed through the Azores before becoming extratropical on September 30.

=== Hurricane Six ===
- Category 4 hurricane (SSHWS)
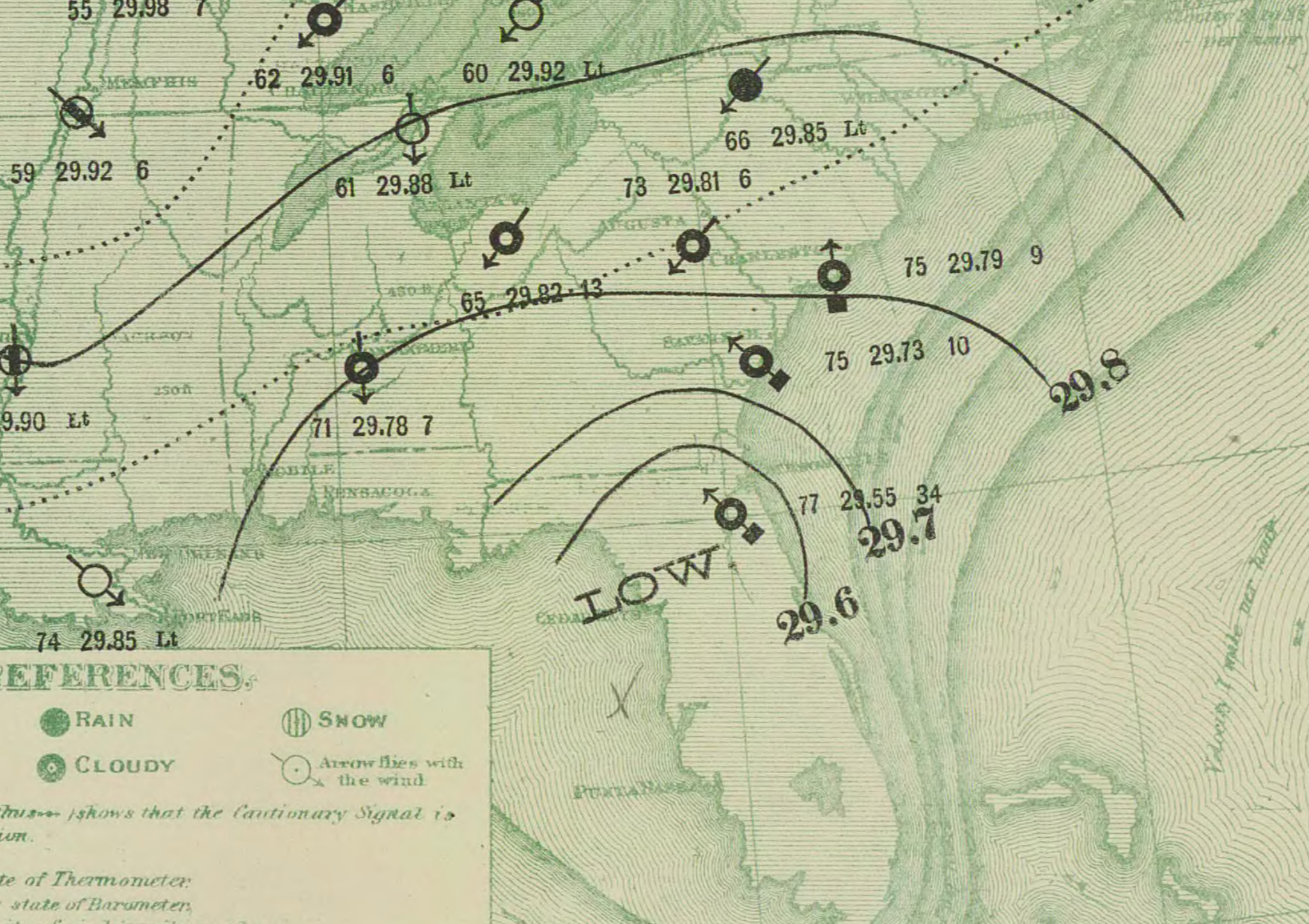
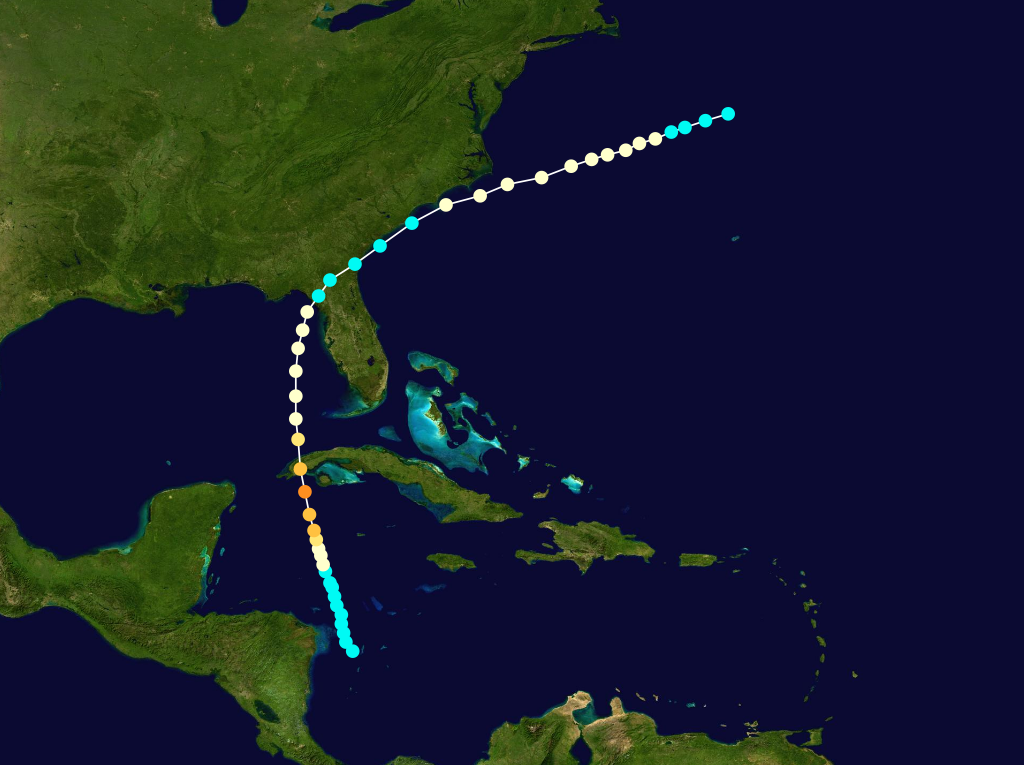
- Duration: October 5 – October 15
- Peak intensity: 140 mph (220 km/h) (1-min);

This storm was first observed on October 5 over the southwestern Caribbean. Trekking slowly north-northwestward, the cyclone is estimated to have intensified into a hurricane on October 7, one day before the barks Tamora and Sadie reported hurricane conditions. The storm strengthened into a major hurricane later on October 8, before making landfall in Cuba early the next day near Boca de Galafre in Pinar del Río Province. A reanalysis by meteorologist Ramón Pérez Suárez estimated sustained winds at 140 mph (220 km/h), making it a Category 4 hurricane. The cyclone weakened greatly over the island, quickly falling to Category 1 status and never recovering while moving northward over the Gulf of Mexico. It made landfall near Horseshoe Beach, Florida, with winds of 80 mph (130 km/h) at 04:00 UTC on October 11 and weakened to a tropical storm a few hours later while moving northeastward. The storm emerged into the Atlantic from the coast of Georgia late on October 11 and re-strengthened into a hurricane by the following day. However, the cyclone weakened back to a tropical storm on October 15 and was last noted several hours later about 350 mi (560 km) southeast of Nantucket, Massachusetts. Chenoweth extended the duration of the cyclone until October 18, with it moving erratically offshore the northeastern United States for a few days.

The hurricane devastated western Cuba. Ivan Ray Tannehill noted in 1938 that the "Town of Pinar del Rio [was] all destroyed". In addition to extensive losses to tobacco crops in the Vuelta Abajo region, the hurricane demolished about 750 dwellings in Consolación del Sur and 300 dwellings and huts in Herradura, approximately 75% of residences in the former. According to the Monthly Weather Review, "equally great" impacts occurred at Ceja de Luna Vinale, Maraqua Galvez, and Pilotos. Around 1,500 warehouses and homes were destroyed in San Juan y Martínez, while another 2,000 homes and tobacco storage buildings suffered similar fates in Guane and approximately 300 homes were obliterated in Hacienda del Valle. Further, the storm swept away numerous homes in San Luis and drowned thousands of cattle. By October 14, 36 bodies of people who drowned due to overflowing rivers at San Cristóbal had been recovered. In Florida, winds reached 44 mph (71 km/h) at Jacksonville and 56 mph (90 km/h) at Cedar Key. The storm caused considerable damage in North Florida to telegraph lines, wharves and small boats, totaling about $5,000-$6,000. Charleston, South Carolina, reported downed chimneys, fences, and trees. In North Carolina, the storm produced 4.3 in (110 mm) of precipitation in Wilmington and sustained winds up to 42 mph (68 km/h) at Fort Macon, downing a Signal Service wire between the two locations. Throughout its path, the storm caused 140 deaths.

=== Other storms ===
Climate researcher Michael Chenoweth proposed four storms not currently listed in HURDAT. The first such system developed roughly halfway between Bermuda and the Azores on July 31. Moving southward, the cyclone strengthened into a tropical storm on August 1 and then turned southwestward on August 3, several hours before becoming extratropical. On September 2, another unofficial system formed over the Bay of Campeche. The storm slowly intensified into a minimal hurricane just prior to making landfall near Rockport, Texas, on September 6. By, the following day, the cyclone dissipated over Burleson County. Chenoweth first noted a tropical storm on October 14 over the central Atlantic. Trekking generally northeastward, the system passed just west of the Azores before becoming extratropical on October 17. The fourth and final new storm proposed by Chenoweth formed on October 24 east of the Leeward Islands. Intensifying into a tropical storm later that day, the system moved northwestward, before turning northward on October 25 and northeastward on October 26. The cyclone became extratropical on October 28 while situated well north of the Azores.

== Season effects ==
This is a table of all of the known storms that have formed in the 1882 Atlantic hurricane season. It includes their duration, landfall, damages, and death totals. Deaths in parentheses are additional and indirect (an example of an indirect death would be a traffic accident), but were still related to that storm. Damage and deaths include totals while the storm was extratropical, a wave, or a low, and all of the damage figures are in 1882 USD.

Saffir–Simpson scale
TD	TS	C1	C2	C3	C4	C5

1882 North Atlantic tropical cyclone season statistics
Storm name	Dates active	Storm category at peak intensity	Max 1-min wind mph (km/h)	Min. press. (mbar)	Areas affected	Damage (US$)	Deaths	Ref(s).
One	August 24–25	Category 1 hurricane	80 (130)	Unknown	None	None	None	
Two	September 2–12	Category 3 hurricane	125 (205)	949	Turks and Caicos Islands, Bahamas, Cuba (Camagüey Province), Gulf Coast of the United States (Florida), East Coast of the United States	>$100,000	>1	
Three	September 14–16	Tropical storm	60 (95)	Unknown	Texas, Louisiana	Unknown	None	
Four	September 21–24	Tropical storm	60 (95)	1005	East Coast of the United States (North Carolina and New York)	Unknown	None	
Five	September 24–28	Category 1 hurricane	80 (130)	970	None	None	None	
Six	October 5–15	Category 4 hurricane	140 (220)	≤975	Cuba, Southeastern United States (Florida)	>$5,000	140	
Season aggregates
6 systems	August 24 – October 15		140 (220)	949		>$105,000	141	

== See also ==
- Atlantic hurricane season
- Tropical cyclone observation
- Atlantic hurricane reanalysis project
