= Syringa (disambiguation) =

Syringa is a genus of woody shrubs and trees, commonly known as lilacs.

Syringa may also refer to:

Places:

- Syringa, Idaho, United States, an unincorporated town
- Syringa, Virginia, United States, an unincorporated community
- Syringa Provincial Park, British Columbia, Canada
- 1104 Syringa, an asteroid

Plants:

- Melia azedarach, a species of deciduous tree commonly but erroneously called Syringa in South Africa
- Philadelphus, particularly P. lewisii, sometimes confusingly known as syringa

Other uses:

- Syringa Marshall-Burnett (1935–2014), former President of the Senate of Jamaica
- Syringa Wireless, on the list of United States wireless communications service providers
