= Butylo, Virginia =

Unincorporated community in Virginia, United States

- Unincorporated community
- Location within Virginia Location within the United States
- Coordinates: 37°46′16″N 76°41′17″W
- Country: United States
- State: Virginia
- Counties: Essex and Middlesex
- Elevation: 118 ft (36 m)
- Time zone: UTC-5 (Eastern (EST))
  - Summer (DST): UTC-4 (EDT)
- Area code: 804
- GNIS feature ID: 1477165

Butylo is an unincorporated community in Essex and Middlesex counties, in the U.S. state of Virginia.
