= Hustle, Virginia =

Unincorporated community in Virginia, United States

- Unincorporated community
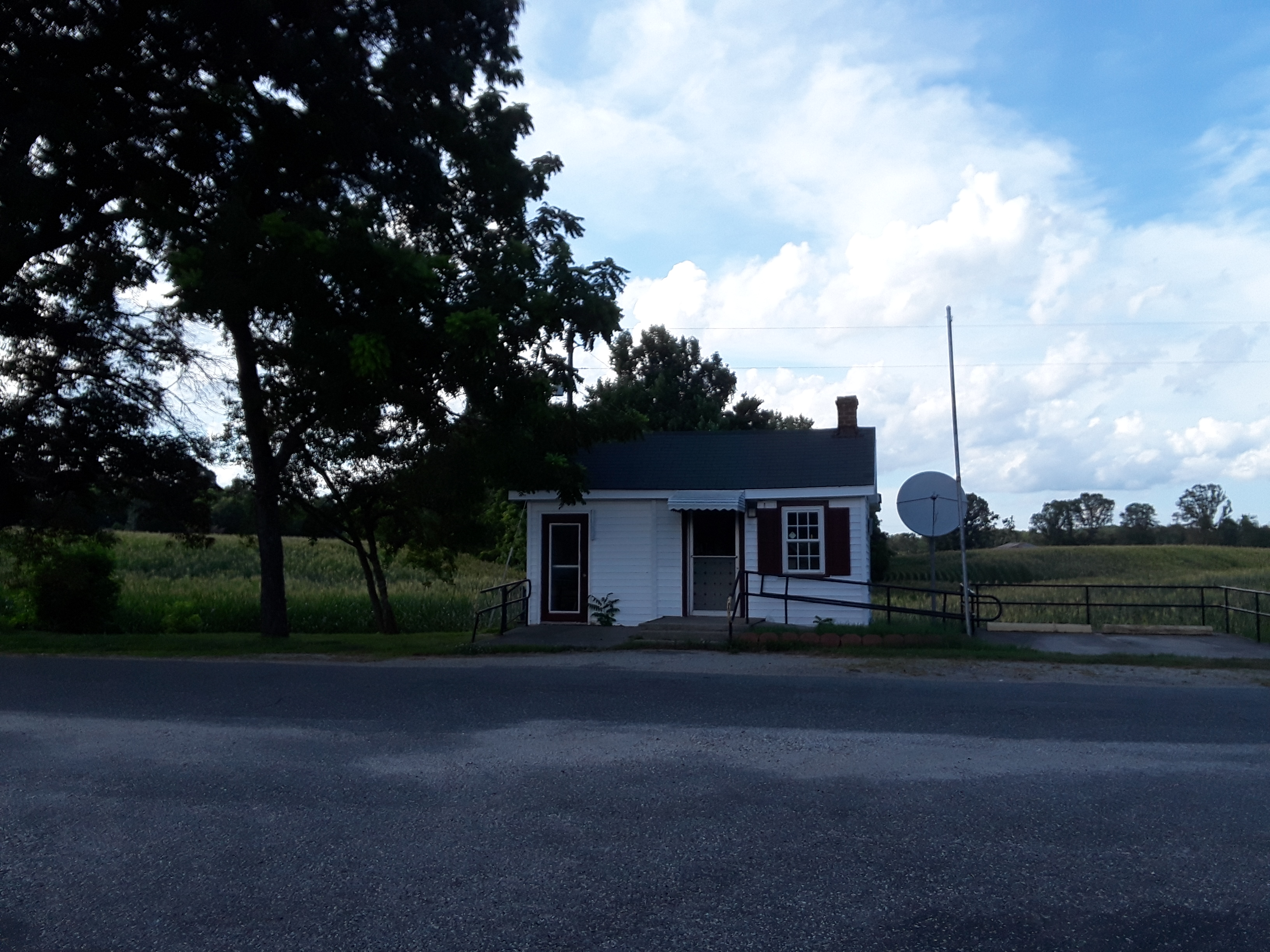
- House in Hustle, July 2018

- Location within Virginia Location within the United States
- Coordinates: 38°02′33″N 77°04′10″W
- Country: United States
- State: Virginia
- County: Essex
- Elevation: 164 ft (50 m)
- Time zone: UTC-5 (Eastern (EST))
  - Summer (DST): UTC-4 (EDT)
- Area code: 804
- GNIS feature ID: 1468437

Hustle is an unincorporated community in Essex County, in the U.S. state of Virginia.

== History ==
A post office called Hustle has been in operation since 1909. The community was so named by a pickle vendor whose customers would "hustle" in to buy his product.
