= Church View, Virginia =

Unincorporated community in Virginia, United States

- Unincorporated community
- Location within Virginia Location within the United States
- Coordinates: 37°40′40″N 76°40′42″W
- Country: United States
- State: Virginia
- County: Middlesex
- Elevation: 102 ft (31 m)
- Time zone: UTC-5 (Eastern (EST))
  - Summer (DST): UTC-4 (EDT)
- ZIP code: 23032
- Area code: 804
- GNIS feature ID: 1464923

Church View is an unincorporated community in Middlesex County, Virginia, United States. Church View is located on U.S. Route 17, 6.3 miles (10.1 km) west-northwest of Urbanna. Church View has a post office with ZIP code 23032, which opened on May 20, 1852.
