= Wake, Virginia =

Unincorporated community in Virginia, United States

- Unincorporated community
- Location within Virginia Location within the United States
- Coordinates: 37°34′05″N 76°25′45″W
- Country: United States
- State: Virginia
- County: Middlesex
- Elevation: 59 ft (18 m)
- Time zone: UTC−5 (Eastern (EST))
  - Summer (DST): UTC−4 (EDT)
- ZIP code: 23176
- Area code: 804
- GNIS feature ID: 1500267

Wake is an unincorporated community in Middlesex County, Virginia, United States. Wake is 9.5 miles (15.3 km) east-southeast of Saluda. Wake has a post office with ZIP code 23176, which opened on February 19, 1898.
