= Laneview, Virginia =

Unincorporated community in Virginia, United States

- Unincorporated community
- Location within Virginia Location within the United States
- Coordinates: 37°45′32″N 76°43′29″W
- Country: United States
- State: Virginia
- County: Essex
- Elevation: 128 ft (39 m)
- Time zone: UTC-5 (Eastern (EST))
  - Summer (DST): UTC-4 (EDT)
- Area code: 804
- GNIS feature ID: 1495815

Laneview is an unincorporated community in Essex County, Virginia, United States.
