= Nohead Bottom, Virginia =

Unincorporated community in Virginia, United States

- Unincorporated community
- Location within Virginia Location within the United States
- Coordinates: 37°35′36″N 76°29′58″W
- Country: United States
- State: Virginia
- County: Middlesex
- Elevation: 79 ft (24 m)
- Time zone: UTC-5 (Eastern (EST))
  - Summer (DST): UTC-4 (EDT)
- GNIS feature ID: 1499804

Nohead Bottom is an unincorporated community in Middlesex County, Virginia, United States. It was also known as Nohead.
