= Syringa, Virginia =

Unincorporated community in Virginia, United States

- Unincorporated community
- Location within Virginia Location within the United States
- Coordinates: 37°34′44″N 76°27′24″W
- Country: United States
- State: Virginia
- County: Middlesex
- Elevation: 56 ft (17 m)
- Time zone: UTC−5 (Eastern (EST))
  - Summer (DST): UTC−4 (EDT)
- ZIP code: 23169
- Area code: 804
- GNIS feature ID: 1475417

Syringa is an unincorporated community in Middlesex County, Virginia, United States. Syringa is 7.8 miles (12.6 km) east-southeast of Saluda. Syringa had a post office, which closed on September 3, 1988.

== Education ==
- Syringa High School closed in 1950 with the creation of Middlesex High School. The auditorium of the school, built circa 1936, is now the Freeshade Community Center.
