= Hardyville, Virginia =

Unincorporated community in Virginia, United States

- Unincorporated community
- Location within Virginia Location within the United States
- Coordinates: 37°33′24″N 76°22′19″W
- Country: United States
- State: Virginia
- County: Middlesex
- Elevation: 36 ft (11 m)
- Time zone: UTC-5 (Eastern (EST))
  - Summer (DST): UTC-4 (EDT)
- ZIP code: 23070
- Area code: 804
- GNIS feature ID: 1467746

Hardyville is an unincorporated community in Middlesex County, Virginia, United States. Hardyville is located on Virginia State Route 33, 1.7 miles (2.7 km) west of Deltaville. Hardyville has a post office with ZIP code 23070, which opened on October 14, 1922.
