= Wares Wharf, Virginia =

Unincorporated community in Virginia, United States

- Unincorporated community
- Location within Virginia Location within the United States
- Coordinates: 37°52′25″N 76°47′01″W
- Country: United States
- State: Virginia
- County: Essex
- Elevation: 0 ft (0 m)
- Time zone: UTC−5 (Eastern (EST))
  - Summer (DST): UTC−4 (EDT)
- Area code: 804
- GNIS feature ID: 1493757

Wares Wharf is an unincorporated community in Essex County in the U.S. state of Virginia.
