= Piankatank River =

Coordinates: 37.520551°N 76.301384°W

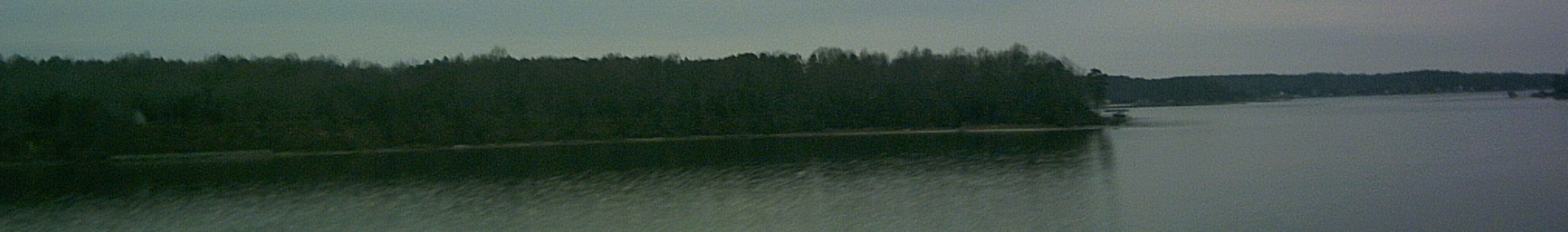
The banks of the Piankatank River

The Piankatank River is a 24.4-mile-long (39.3 km) river in the U.S. state of Virginia. Located on the Middle Peninsula, between the Rappahannock and York rivers, it was the site of numerous actions during the American Civil War.

The Piankatank is primarily a tidal river of the Chesapeake Bay. The head of the river meets with the mouth of Dragon Swamp. Bordered by Mathews and Gloucester counties to the south and Middlesex County to the north, the Piankatank is crossed only by Virginia State Route 3 approximately 8 miles (13 km) upriver of its mouth.

== See also ==
- List of Virginia rivers
