= Essex County, Virginia =

County in Virginia, United States

- County
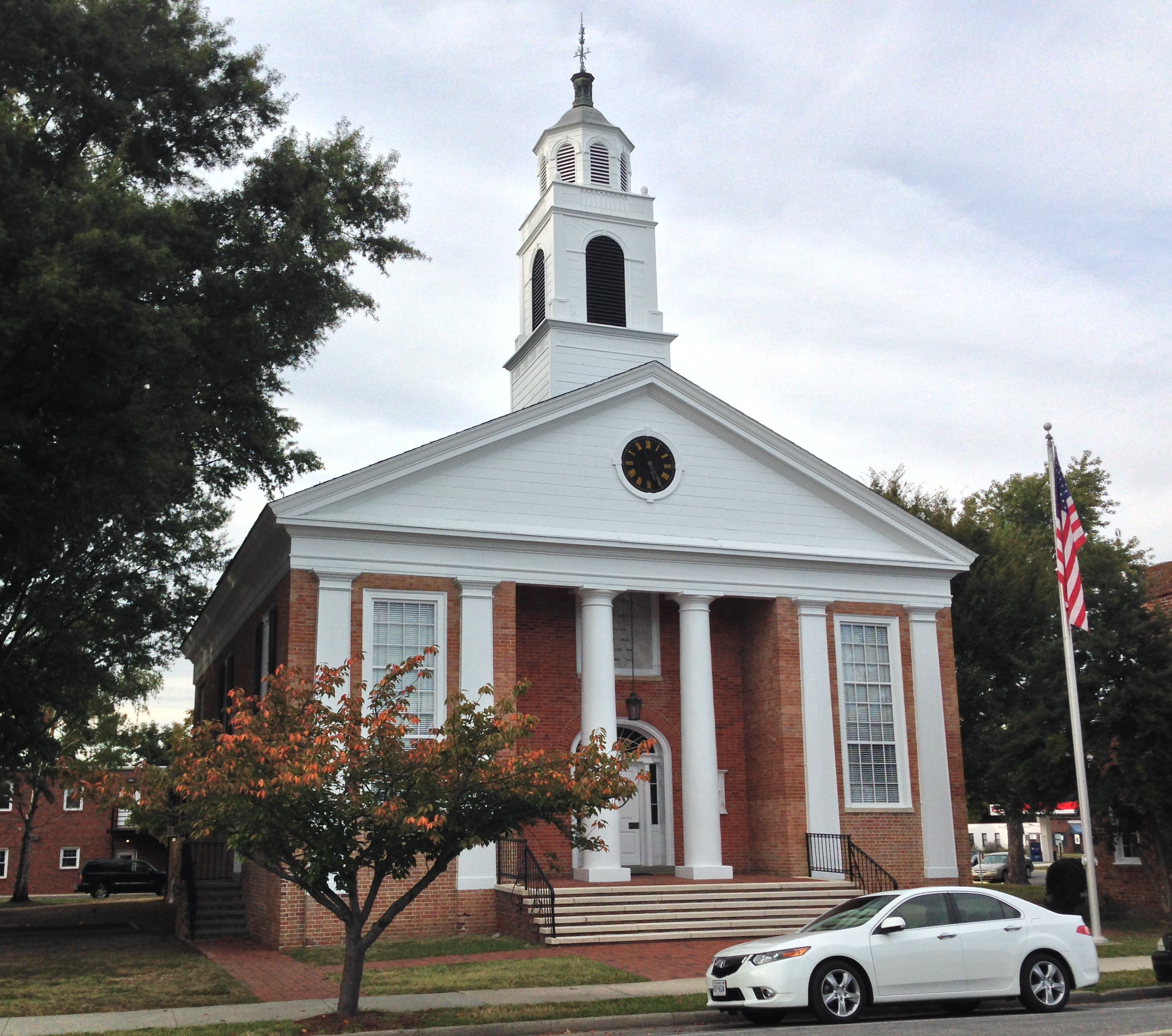
- Essex County Courthouse in Tappahannock

- Flag Seal

- Location within the U.S. state of Virginia
- Coordinates: 37°56′N 76°57′W
- Country: United States
- State: Virginia
- Founded: 1692
- Seat: Tappahannock
- Largest town: Tappahannock

Area
  - Total: 286 sq mi (740 km^{2})
  - Land: 257 sq mi (670 km^{2})
  - Water: 29 sq mi (75 km^{2}) 10.1%

Population (2020)
  - Total: 10,599
  - Estimate (2025): 10,654 ▲
  - Density: 41.2/sq mi (15.9/km^{2})
- Time zone: UTC−5 (Eastern)
  - Summer (DST): UTC−4 (EDT)
- Congressional district: 1st
- Website: www.essexva.gov

Essex County is a United States county located in the Middle Peninsula of the Commonwealth of Virginia. The county is bordered by the Rappahannock River on the north and King and Queen County on the south. As of the 2020 census, the county's population was 10,599. The county seat is the historic town of Tappahannock.

The county was created in 1692, when the old Rappahannock County was dissolved to form the new Essex and Richmond counties, and was named to honor Essex in England. Due to the region's location on the Rappahannock River, it was one of the early areas visited by English explorer John Smith. Smith's three trips led to him being captured, attacked and finally making peace with the resident indigenous Powhatan people.

== History ==
Essex County was established in 1692 from the old Rappahannock County, Virginia (not to be confused with the present-day Rappahannock County, Virginia). The county is named for either the shire or county in England, or for the Earl of Essex.

== Geography ==
According to the U.S. Census Bureau, the county has a total area of 286 square miles (740 km^{2}), of which 257 square miles (670 km^{2}) is land and 29 square miles (75 km^{2}) (10.1%) is water. Its main town, Tappahanock, is focused at the Rappahanock River.

=== Adjacent counties ===
- Westmoreland County – north
- Richmond County – northeast
- Middlesex County – southeast
- King and Queen County – south
- Caroline County – west
- King George County – northwest

=== Major highways ===
- US 17
- US 360

=== National protected area ===
- Rappahannock River Valley National Wildlife Refuge (part) Hutchinson unit, Thomas unit

== Demographics ==
Historical population
Census	Pop.	Note	%±
1790	9,122		—
1800	9,508		4.2%
1810	9,376		−1.4%
1820	9,909		5.7%
1830	10,521		6.2%
1840	11,309		7.5%
1850	10,206		−9.8%
1860	10,469		2.6%
1870	9,927		−5.2%
1880	11,032		11.1%
1890	10,047		−8.9%
1900	9,701		−3.4%
1910	9,105		−6.1%
1920	8,542		−6.2%
1930	6,976		−18.3%
1940	7,006		0.4%
1950	6,530		−6.8%
1960	6,690		2.5%
1970	7,099		6.1%
1980	8,864		24.9%
1990	8,689		−2.0%
2000	9,989		15.0%
2010	11,151		11.6%
2020	10,599		−5.0%
2025 (est.)	10,654	▲	0.5%
U.S. Decennial Census; 1790-1960 1900-1990; 1990-2000 2010 2020

=== Racial and ethnic composition ===
Essex County, Virginia – Racial and ethnic composition Note: the US Census treats Hispanic/Latino as an ethnic category. This table excludes Latinos from the racial categories and assigns them to a separate category. Hispanics/Latinos may be of any race.
Race / Ethnicity (NH = Non-Hispanic)	Pop 1980	Pop 1990	Pop 2000	Pop 2010	Pop 2020	% 1980	% 1990	% 2000	% 2010	% 2020
White alone (NH)	5,196	5,311	5,762	6,239	5,871	58.62%	61.12%	57.68%	55.95%	55.39%
Black or African American alone (NH)	3,498	3,259	3,879	4,224	3,743	39.46%	37.51%	38.83%	37.88%	35.31%
Native American or Alaska Native alone (NH)	35	46	54	46	61	0.39%	0.53%	0.54%	0.41%	0.58%
Asian alone (NH)	43	40	81	86	62	0.49%	0.46%	0.81%	0.77%	0.58%
Native Hawaiian or Pacific Islander alone (NH)	x	x	2	2	3	x	x	0.02%	0.02%	0.03%
Other race alone (NH)	18	3	19	13	40	0.20%	0.03%	0.19%	0.12%	0.38%
Mixed race or Multiracial (NH)	x	x	120	192	450	x	x	1.20%	1.72%	4.25%
Hispanic or Latino (any race)	74	30	72	349	369	0.83%	0.35%	0.72%	3.13%	3.48%
Total	8,864	8,689	9,989	11,151	10,599	100.00%	100.00%	100.00%	100.00%	100.00%

=== 2020 census ===
As of the 2020 census, the county had a population of 10,599. The median age was 48.6 years. 18.9% of residents were under the age of 18 and 24.6% of residents were 65 years of age or older. For every 100 females there were 89.8 males, and for every 100 females age 18 and over there were 86.8 males age 18 and over.

The racial makeup of the county was 56.2% White, 35.6% Black or African American, 0.8% American Indian and Alaska Native, 0.6% Asian, 0.0% Native Hawaiian and Pacific Islander, 1.7% from some other race, and 5.2% from two or more races. Hispanic or Latino residents of any race comprised 3.5% of the population.

0.0% of residents lived in urban areas, while 100.0% lived in rural areas.

There were 4,572 households in the county, of which 24.6% had children under the age of 18 living with them and 31.4% had a female householder with no spouse or partner present. About 29.4% of all households were made up of individuals and 14.7% had someone living alone who was 65 years of age or older.

There were 5,742 housing units, of which 20.4% were vacant. Among occupied housing units, 70.8% were owner-occupied and 29.2% were renter-occupied. The homeowner vacancy rate was 1.8% and the rental vacancy rate was 7.7%.

=== 2000 Census ===
As of the census of 2000, there were 9,989 people, 3,995 households, and 2,740 families residing in the county. The population density was 39 people per square mile (15 people/km^{2}). There were 4,926 housing units at an average density of 19 units per square mile (7.3 units/km^{2}). The racial makeup of the county was 57.96% White, 39.04% Black or African American, 0.55% Native American, 0.81% Asian, 0.03% Pacific Islander, 0.32% from other races, and 1.28% from two or more races. 0.72% of the population were Hispanic or Latino of any race.

There were 3,995 households, out of which 28.00% had children under the age of 18 living with them, 50.70% were married couples living together, 14.00% had a female householder with no husband present, and 31.40% were non-families. 26.10% of all households were made up of individuals, and 11.30% had someone living alone who was 65 years of age or older. The average household size was 2.46 and the average family size was 2.95.

In the county, the population was spread out, with 22.90% under the age of 18, 7.00% from 18 to 24, 27.00% from 25 to 44, 25.70% from 45 to 64, and 17.30% who were 65 years of age or older. The median age was 40 years. For every 100 females there were 89.90 males. For every 100 females age 18 and over, there were 88.20 males.

The median income for a household in the county was $37,395, and the median income for a family was $43,588. Males had a median income of $29,736 versus $22,253 for females. The per capita income for the county was $17,994. About 7.70% of families and 11.20% of the population were below the poverty line, including 16.80% of those under age 18 and 11.80% of those age 65 or over.

== Government ==
=== Board of supervisors ===
- Central District: John Magruder (I)
- Greater Tappahannock District: Robert Akers (I)
- North District: Joseph "Joe" A. Henry
- South District: Ronnie Gill
- At Large: J. Calvin Haile Jr.

=== Constitutional officers ===
- Clerk of the Circuit Court: Christina A. Ambrose (I)
- Commissioner of the Revenue: Kristen Andrews Foster (I)
- Commonwealth's Attorney: James M. Sitton, II
- Sheriff: Walter "Arnie" Holmes (I)
- Treasurer: B. A. "Penny" Davis (I)

Essex is represented by Republican Ryan T. McDougle in the Virginia Senate, Republican M. Keith Hodges in the Virginia House of Delegates, and Republican Robert J. "Rob" Wittman in the U.S. House of Representatives.

United States presidential election results for Essex County, Virginia
Year	Republican		Democratic		Third party(ies)	
Year	No.	%	No.	%	No.	%
1912	72	19.94%	278	77.01%	11	3.05%
1916	77	20.32%	302	79.68%	0	0.00%
1920	101	24.05%	319	75.95%	0	0.00%
1924	60	15.63%	315	82.03%	9	2.34%
1928	195	37.79%	321	62.21%	0	0.00%
1932	101	19.27%	420	80.15%	3	0.57%
1936	116	17.98%	527	81.71%	2	0.31%
1940	145	20.92%	547	78.93%	1	0.14%
1944	179	25.98%	508	73.73%	2	0.29%
1948	221	33.95%	329	50.54%	101	15.51%
1952	610	52.45%	545	46.86%	8	0.69%
1956	597	55.48%	328	30.48%	151	14.03%
1960	606	54.25%	509	45.57%	2	0.18%
1964	789	50.90%	760	49.03%	1	0.06%
1968	791	36.55%	897	41.45%	476	22.00%
1972	1,482	62.58%	808	34.12%	78	3.29%
1976	1,380	50.55%	1,306	47.84%	44	1.61%
1980	1,581	52.93%	1,280	42.85%	126	4.22%
1984	2,120	61.63%	1,300	37.79%	20	0.58%
1988	2,038	60.56%	1,294	38.45%	33	0.98%
1992	1,897	48.59%	1,583	40.55%	424	10.86%
1996	1,627	46.05%	1,668	47.21%	238	6.74%
2000	1,995	52.08%	1,750	45.68%	86	2.24%
2004	2,304	53.04%	2,007	46.20%	33	0.76%
2008	2,379	44.35%	2,934	54.70%	51	0.95%
2012	2,602	45.85%	3,016	53.15%	57	1.00%
2016	2,657	49.13%	2,542	47.00%	209	3.86%
2020	3,075	49.77%	3,038	49.17%	65	1.05%
2024	3,245	53.42%	2,775	45.69%	54	0.89%

== Education ==
Essex County Public Schools (ECPS) is the public schools system for Essex County, Virginia, United States. The following schools make up the Essex County Public Schools system:

Tappahannock Elementary School (Grades PK - 4th)
James H. Cary intermediate school (Grades 5th - 8th)
Essex High School (Grades 9th - 12th)

Other schools located in Essex County include:

St Margaret's School (Grades 8th - 12th, girls only)
Tappahannock Junior Academy (Grades K - 10th)
Aylett Country Day School (Grades PK - 8th)

== Communities ==
=== Town ===
- Tappahannock

=== Unincorporated communities ===
- Blandfield
- Brays Fork
- Bowler's Wharf
- Butylo
- Caret
- Center Cross
- Champlain
- Dunbrooke
- Dunnsville
- Hustle
- Laneview (shares with Middlesex County)
- Loretto
- Miller's Tavern
- Passing (shares with Caroline County)
- Supply
- Wares Wharf

== Notable people ==
- Chris Brown, Grammy Award-winning R&B singer who was born and raised in the county
- Richard B. Garnett, Confederate general who was killed while leading his brigade during Pickett's Charge
- David George, African American ex-slave founder of Silver Bluff Baptist Church who was born in the county
- Robert Mercer Taliaferro Hunter (1809–1887), Speaker of the United States House of Representatives and Confederate States Secretary of State
- Xavier McDaniel, former NBA player who once lived in the county.
- Paul S. Trible Jr., U.S. Senator who served as Commonwealth's Attorney of Essex County

== See also ==
- National Register of Historic Places listings in Essex County, Virginia
