= National Register of Historic Places listings in King and Queen County, Virginia =

Location of King and Queen County in Virginia

This is a list of the National Register of Historic Places listings in King and Queen County, Virginia.

This is intended to be a complete list of the properties and districts on the National Register of Historic Places in King and Queen County, Virginia, United States. The locations of National Register properties and districts for which the latitude and longitude coordinates are included below, may be seen in an online map.

There are 17 properties and districts listed on the National Register in the county.
This National Park Service list is complete through NPS recent listings posted March 6, 2026.

== Current listings ==
	Name on the Register	Image	Date listed	Location	City or town	Description
1	Bewdley	Bewdley	November 16, 1978 (#78003024)	South of St. Stephens Church on the Mattaponi River; 37°45′06″N 77°03′53″W	St. Stephens Church	
2	Bruington Rural Historic District	Bruington Rural Historic District	March 11, 2019 (#100003481)	Along Rose Mount Rd., Pea Ridge Rd., The Trail, Bruington Rd., and Norwood Rd. 37°46′36″N 76°59′30″W	Bruington	
3	Dixon	Dixon	January 20, 2005 (#04001539)	402 Limehouse Rd. 37°35′01″N 76°47′29″W	Shacklefords	
4	Farmington	Farmington	March 17, 1995 (#95000243)	1.5 miles (2.4 km) southeast of the junction of U.S. Route 360 and State Route 14; 37°46′44″N 77°02′13″W	St. Stephens Church	
5	Fort Mattapony	Fort Mattapony	August 19, 1994 (#94000547)	By the cemetery at Locust Grove Plantation; 37°43′45″N 77°00′42″W	Walkerton	
6	Hillsborough	Hillsborough	September 22, 1971 (#71000984)	2 miles (3.2 km) southeast of Walkerton off Walkerton Landing Rd. 37°42′36″N 76°59′00″W	Walkerton	
7	Holly Hill	Holly Hill	July 24, 1973 (#73002026)	Northeast of Aylett off U.S. Route 360; 37°47′41″N 77°05′04″W	Aylett	
8	King and Queen Courthouse Green Historic District	King and Queen Courthouse Green Historic District	September 24, 1998 (#98001162)	Junction of Allen Circle and Courthouse Landing Rd., northwest of Shacklefords; also 106 Allen Circle; 37°40′10″N 76°52′41″W	Shacklefords	106 Allen Circle represents a boundary increase of February 5, 2014
9	Marriott School	Marriott School	February 13, 2007 (#07000052)	450 Newtown Rd. 37°48′28″N 77°03′15″W	St. Stephens Church	Houses the King and Queen County branch of the Pamunkey Regional Library
10	Mattaponi Church	Mattaponi Church	March 20, 1973 (#73002027)	½ mile south of Cumnor off State Route 14; 37°43′08″N 76°53′13″W	Cumnor	
11	Millers Tavern Rural Historic District	Millers Tavern Rural Historic District	June 5, 2017 (#100001040)	Roughly bounded by U.S. Route 360 and Howerton, Dunbrooke, Latanes Mill, and Midway Rds. 37°49′43″N 76°57′02″W	Millers Tavern	Extends into Essex County
12	Chief Otho S. and Susie P. Nelson House		August 8, 2019 (#100004262)	Address Restricted	Indian Neck vicinity	
13	Newington Archaeological Site	Newington Archaeological Site	March 31, 2010 (#10000146)	697 Frazier Ferry Rd. 37°40′20″N 76°54′12″W	King and Queen Courthouse	
14	Newtown Historic District	Newtown Historic District	October 29, 1982 (#82001821)	Newtown and Byrd's Mill Rds. 37°54′48″N 77°07′41″W	Newtown	
15	Northbank	Northbank	March 7, 2006 (#06000121)	453 N. Bank Rd. 37°45′56″N 77°04′28″W	Walkerton	
16	Providence Plantation and Farm	Providence Plantation and Farm	September 3, 2009 (#09000689)	1302 Roundabout Route Rd. 37°54′56″N 77°10′35″W	Newtown	
17	Upper Church, Stratton Major Parish	Upper Church, Stratton Major Parish	April 2, 1973 (#73002030)	Southeast of Shanghai on State Route 14; 37°36′10″N 76°46′15″W	Shanghai	

== See also ==
- List of National Historic Landmarks in Virginia
- National Register of Historic Places listings in Virginia
