= Hillsboro =

Hillsboro may refer to several places:

== Places ==
=== United States ===
- Hillsboro, Alabama, in Lawrence County
- Hillsboro, Georgia, in Jasper County
- Hillsboro, Illinois
- Hillsboro, Indiana, in Fountain County
- Hillsboro, Henry County, Indiana, a small village
- Hillsboro, Iowa
- Hillsboro, Kansas
- Hillsboro, Kentucky, in Fleming County
- Hillsboro, Maryland
- Hillsboro, Mississippi, in Scott County
- Hillsboro, Missouri
- Hillsboro, New Mexico
- Hillsboro, North Dakota
- Hillsboro, Ohio
- Hillsboro, Oregon
- Hillsboro, Pennsylvania, in Somerset County
- Hillsboro, Tennessee
- Hillsboro, Texas
- Hillsboro, King and Queen County, Virginia
- Hillsboro, Loudoun County, Virginia
- Hillsboro, West Virginia
- Hillsboro (town), Wisconsin
  - Hillsboro, Wisconsin, a city in the town

=== Fictional ===
- Hillsboro, Tennessee, the setting of the 1955 play Inherit the Wind

== See also ==
- Hillsboro Historic District (disambiguation)
- Hillsborough (disambiguation)
