= Hillsboro Historic District =

Hillsboro Historic District may refer to:

in the United States

(by state then city)

- Hillsborough Historic District, Hillsborough, North Carolina, listed on the National Register of Historic Places (NRHP)
- Hillsboro Historic Business District, Hillsboro, Ohio, listed on the NRHP in Highland County, Ohio
- Hillsboro-West End Historic District, Nashville Tennessee, listed on the NRHP in Davidson County, Tennessee
- Hillsboro Residential Historic District, Hillsboro Texas, listed on the NRHP in Hill County, Texas
- Hillsboro Historic District (Hillsboro, Virginia), NRHP-listed
- Hillsborough (Walkerton, Virginia), listed on the NRHP in King and Queen County, Virginia
