= Belleview, Virginia =

Unincorporated community in Virginia, United States

- Unincorporated community
- Location in Virginia, United States Belleview (the United States)
- Coordinates: 37°29′3″N 76°44′4″W
- Country: United States
- State: Virginia
- County: King and Queen County

Belleview is an unincorporated community in King and Queen County, Virginia, United States.
