= Dixon (Shacklefords, Virginia) =

Historic house in Virginia, United States

- U.S. National Register of Historic Places
- Virginia Landmarks Register
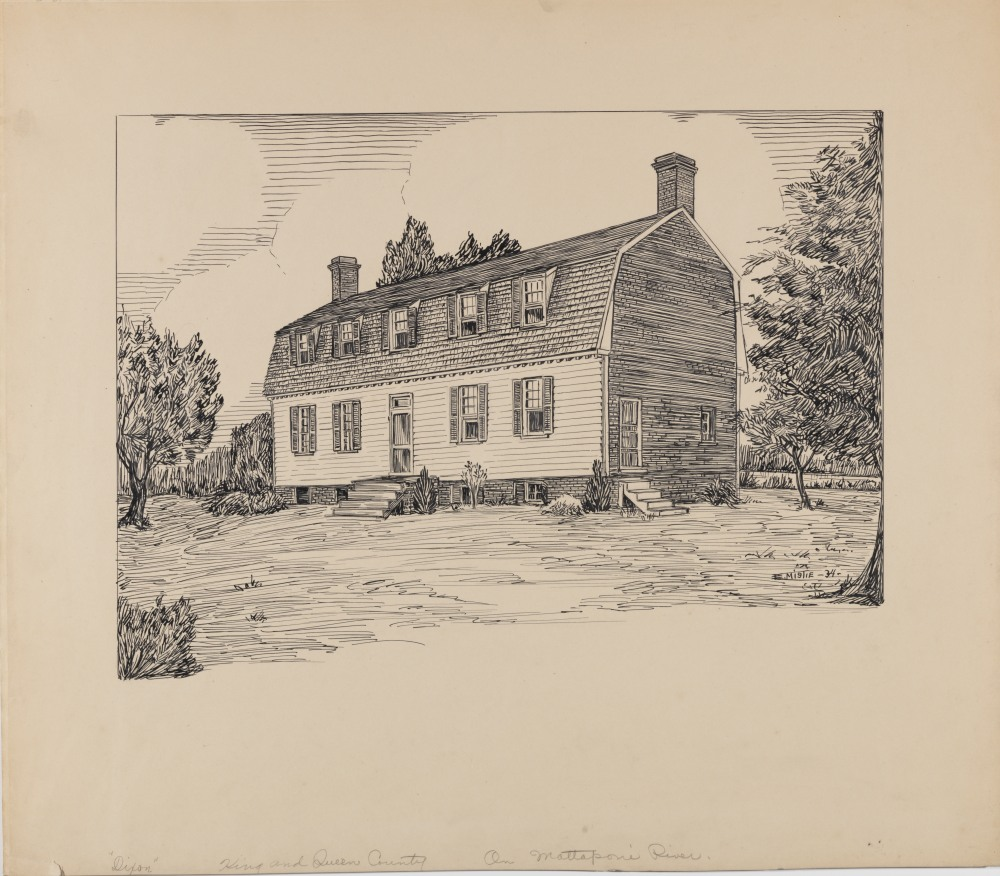

- Location within Virginia Location within the United States
- Location: 402 Limehouse Rd., Shacklefords, Virginia
- Coordinates: 37°35′07″N 76°47′29″W
- Area: 20 acres (8.1 ha)
- Built: c. 1793
- Architectural style: Colonial
- NRHP reference No.: 04001539
- VLR No.: 049-0019

Significant dates
- Added to NRHP: January 20, 2005
- Designated VLR: December 1, 2004

Dixon, also known as Dixon's Plantation, was a privately owned historic plantation house (1793-2021) in King and Queen County, Virginia on the Mattaponi River—a tributary of the York River in one of Virginia's historic slavery-dependent tobacco-growing regions. The property was situated between the two unincorporated communities of Shacklefords and King and Queen Court House, Virginia.

Dated (by tree-rings) to 1793, the plantation's surviving central residence was a two-story, five-bay, symmetrical frame house with a gambrel roof, brick foundation and brick end-walls—the latter featuring Flemish bond and internal (rather than expressed) chimneys.

Located between two adjacent plantations, the earliest owners of the property were William Meredith and subsequently Richard Dixon, of whom little is known. The plantation and home were named after Richard Dixon, and he is credited with constructing the surviving residence.

At the time of its successful nomination to the National Register of Historic Places (NRHP) in 2005, Dixon was one of eight surviving gambrel-roof residences from the eighteenth and early nineteenth century in King and Queen County, Virginia.

A fire in the spring of 2021 completely destroyed Dixon.

== Description ==
According to its NRHP nomination, the home featured its original interior wood paneling, and noteworthy interior stairway detailing—the latter with sculptural railings, column and urn balusters (two per tread) and newel posts with molded caps and mortise and tenon construction.

Landside and waterside elevations were identical with double doors centered on each exterior elevation, flanked by two "nine-over-nine" sash windows and four horizontal basement windows. The second floor features five flat-headed dormers.

In the 1950s, flanking buildings were added, connected to the main house by segmented hyphens. Later additions which expanded the original five-bay home to a nine-bay home, were subsequently removed.

In 1934, a pen and ink drawing of Dixon (see infobox, this article) was made by Elsie, J. Mistie for the Works Progress Administration Federal Art Project (1932–1937). The drawing documented Dixon before the later additions of hyphen-connected outbuildings.

== Site ==
Records indicate the original site featured out-buildings including a kitchen, smokehouse, barn, wharf, dairy and cemetery. Research indicates a nearby house and kitchen that predate the existing house. Originally nearly 440 acres and now roughly 20 acres, the property at the time of its NRHP nomination featured four non-original outbuildings. The number has since changed with Dixon's subsequent restoration and renovation.

== 2000–2010 restoration ==
The Fry-Jefferson map of the royal colony of Virginia (1752).

Beginning in 2000, the owner of Dixon removed the flanking 1950s Colonial Revival wings, replacing them with more modern additions, including a master wing, screened porch and guest wing. A completely modern workshop/garage dependency (outbuilding) was constructed nearby, in a compatible 18th century architectural style.

During the restoration of the primary wing, period incorrect slate roofing was replaced with the correct wood shingles (fish scale pattern), nails were forged where necessary and replacement siding was replicated after original attic planking.

Interior furnishings included a portrait of George Washington by Thomas Sully, mid-eighteenth century Norfolk chair, period correct knee-hole bureau and 18th century Fry Jefferson Map of Virginia.

== See also ==
- Historic photographs at the Virginia Department of Historic Resources, Dixon plantation house.
- About the WPA Historic Houses Drawings Collection
- About Elsie J. Mistie and the WPA Historic Houses Drawings Collection
- Dixon plantation house, example of Late 18th Century brick work
- The Fry-Jefferson Map Society
