= Providence Plantation =

Providence Plantation may refer to:

- Colony of Rhode Island and Providence Plantations, an English colony on the eastern coast of America, founded in 1636
- Providence Plantation and Farm, a historic landmark site in Virginia, United States
