= Hillsborough =

Hillsborough may refer to:

== Australia ==
- Hillsborough, New South Wales, a suburb of Lake Macquarie

== Canada ==
- Hillsborough, New Brunswick
- Hillsborough Parish, New Brunswick
- Hillsborough, Nova Scotia, in Inverness County
- Hillsborough (electoral district), a defunct Prince Edward Island federal electoral district
- Rural Municipality of Hillsborough No. 132, Saskatchewan

== Grenada ==
- Hillsborough, Carriacou

== Ireland ==
- Hillsborough (Parliament of Ireland constituency)

== New Zealand ==
- Hillsborough, Auckland
- Hillsborough, Christchurch, a suburb

== United Kingdom ==
- Hillsborough, County Down, Northern Ireland
  - Hillsborough, County Down (civil parish)
  - Hillsborough Castle, the State residence in Northern Ireland
- Hillsborough, Devon, England
- Hillsborough, Sheffield, a suburb
  - Sheffield Hillsborough (UK Parliament constituency) former parliamentary constituency
  - Sheffield Brightside and Hillsborough (UK Parliament constituency)
  - Hillsborough (ward), a ward electing 3 members to Sheffield City Council
  - Hillsborough Stadium, home of Sheffield Wednesday football club
    - Hillsborough disaster, a 1989 crush which killed 97 football spectators
      - Hillsborough (1996 film), depicting the Hillsborough disaster
      - Hillsborough (2014 film), a television film about the disaster

== United States ==
- Hillsborough, California
- Hillsborough County, Florida
- Hillsborough, Maryland
- Hillsborough, New Hampshire, a New England town
  - Hillsborough (CDP), New Hampshire, the main village in the town
- Hillsborough County, New Hampshire
- Hillsborough Township, New Jersey
- Hillsborough, North Carolina
  - Hillsborough Historic District, North Carolina

== Other uses ==
- Hillsborough (East Indiaman), several ships

== See also ==
- Hillsboro (disambiguation)
