= Newtown Historic District (Newtown, Virginia) =

Historic district in Virginia, United States

- U.S. National Register of Historic Places
- U.S. Historic district
- Virginia Landmarks Register
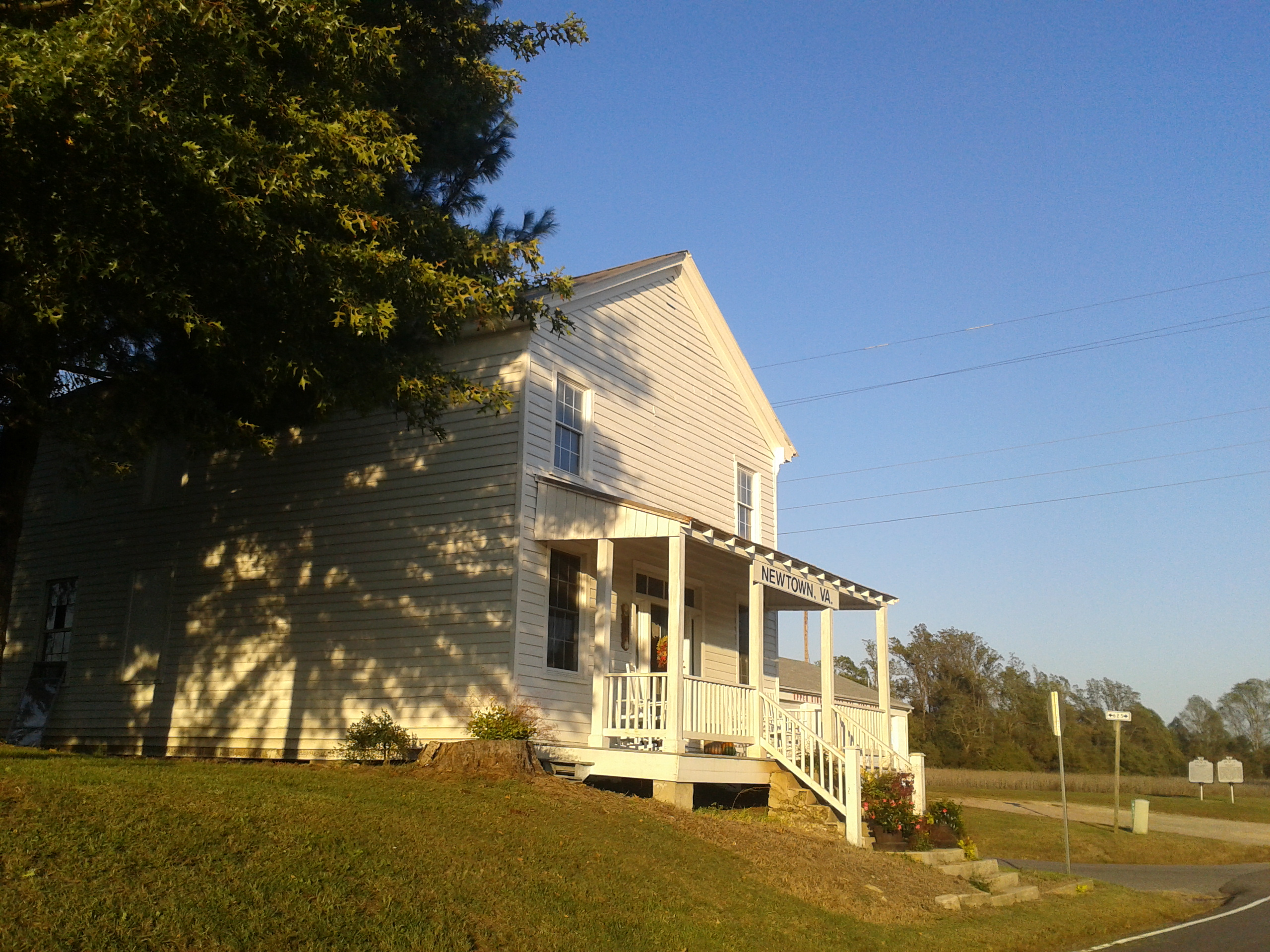
- The frame grocery store (1922), seen in October 2016

- Location within Virginia Location within the United States
- Location: VA 721 and 625, Newtown, Virginia
- Coordinates: 37°54′47″N 77°07′49″W
- Area: 46 acres (19 ha)
- Architectural style: Federal
- NRHP reference No.: 82001821
- VLR No.: 049-0145

Significant dates
- Added to NRHP: October 29, 1982
- Designated VLR: March 17, 1981

Newtown Historic District is a national historic district located at Newtown, King and Queen County, Virginia, United States. About 45 miles northeast of Richmond on the Middle Peninsula, Newtown took the name of the plantation of Captain John Richards, who had a store and ordinary (tavern/inn) on the post road (or King's Highway) between Williamsburg, Virginia and Philadelphia, Pennsylvania. Earlier, it had been the junction of native American Chiskiack trails along the ridge above the York River and trails northeast and northwest. Although many revolutionary-era soldiers from Newtown left the area, the town became known for its private schools, as well as several resident physicians and merchants. Several large plantations surrounded the crossroads, but the county seat was located at King and Queen Courthouse. Newtown became strategically important during the American Civil War, although not a battleground, and in June 1863 Confederate General George Pickett gathered his division in Newtown before departing for the Battle of Gettysburg.

Since its listing on the National Register of Historic Places in 1982, 1982 the district encompasses 22 contributing buildings, 1 contributing site, and 1 contributing structure. The residences are detached, single-family farmhouses of frame construction and range from 1 1/2 to 2 stories in height. The district also includes a frame grocery store (1922) and family cemetery.
