= Farmington (St. Stephens Church, Virginia) =

Historic house in Virginia, United States

- U.S. National Register of Historic Places
- Virginia Landmarks Register
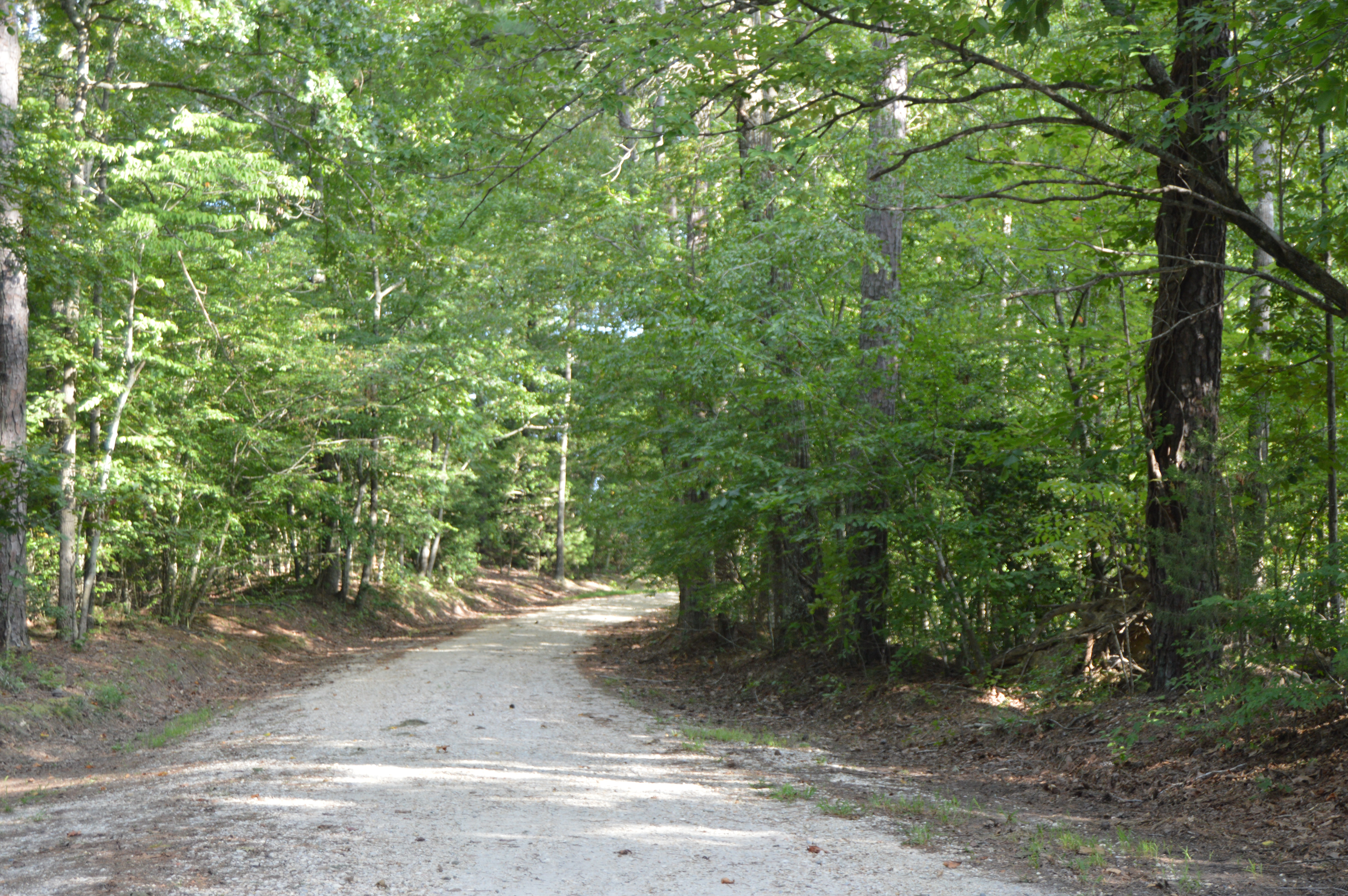
- Property entrance

- Location within Virginia Location within the United States
- Location: 1.5 mi. SE of jct. of VA 14 and US 360, S side, near St. Stephens Church, Virginia
- Coordinates: 37°46′51″N 77°02′09″W
- Area: 515 acres (208 ha)
- Built: c. 1795, 1859-1860
- Architectural style: Mid 19th Century Revival
- NRHP reference No.: 95000243
- VLR No.: 049-0023

Significant dates
- Added to NRHP: March 17, 1995
- Designated VLR: January 15, 1995

Farmington is a historic plantation house located near St. Stephens Church, King and Queen County, Virginia. The original structure was built about 1795, and later enlarged and modified to its present form in 1859–1860. It is a large two-story frame house, with a low-pitch hip roof and deep eaves. It has a two-story rear addition on the building's southwest side and a one-story addition on the southeast side. Also on the property are a contributing large braced-frame barn, a weaving house, and an overseer's house.

It was listed on the National Register of Historic Places in 1995.
