= Mattaponi Church =

Historic church in Virginia, US

- U.S. National Register of Historic Places
- Virginia Landmarks Register
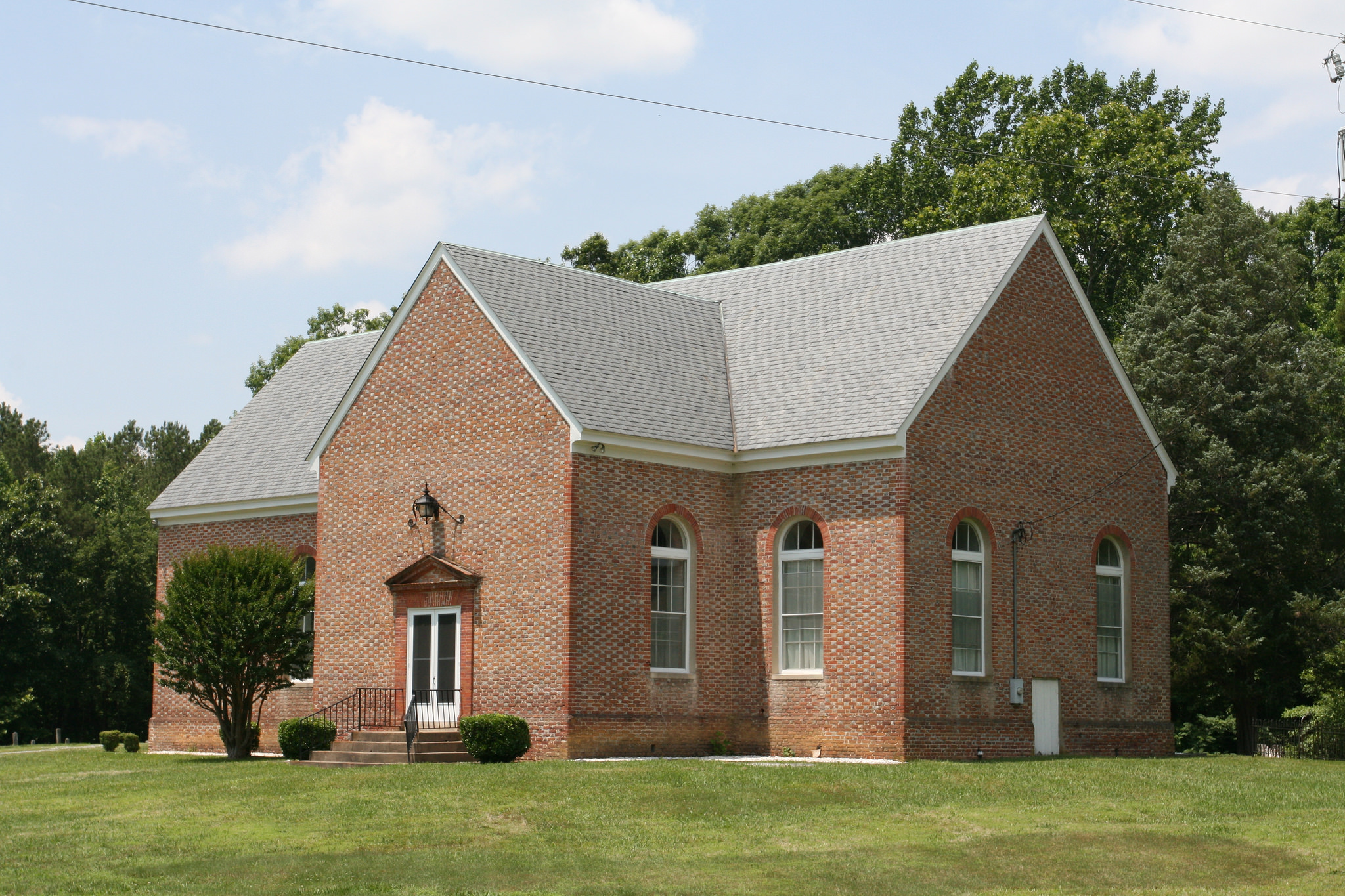
- Mattaponi Church, April 1971

- Location within Virginia Location within the United States
- Location: ½ mile south of Cumnor off VA 14, near Cumnor, Virginia
- Coordinates: 37°43′06″N 76°53′10″W
- Area: 10 acres (4.0 ha)
- Built: c. 1730–1734, 1755, 1922
- Architectural style: Colonial
- NRHP reference No.: 73002027
- VLR No.: 049-0043

Significant dates
- Added to NRHP: March 20, 1973
- Designated VLR: September 19, 1972

Mattaponi Church is a historic Baptist Church (formerly an Episcopal Church) located near Cumnor, King and Queen County, Virginia. As English settlement advanced through present-day King and Queen County, the original Anglican parish, Stratton Major, was divided in 1674, forming St. Stephen's Parish to the northwest. In 1730, construction commenced on a new "Lower Church" for St. Stephen's Parish which was completed around 1734. The structure is designed in a cruciform plan executed in Georgian style. Of particular note are the church's three entrances, which have rubbed brick pilasters and pediments, two achieved in triangular form (north and south doorways) and one in semicircular form (west doorway). The entire church is built of bricks laid in Flemish bond. St. Stephen's Church was used for Anglican worship until the American Revolution when it was abandoned. In 1803, the church was occupied by a Baptist congregation which continues to worship in the historic church today. When the Baptists assumed ownership of the church, it was renamed Mattaponi. Fire gutted the interior of the church in 1922, but it was restored and remains well preserved. Today, historic Mattaponi Baptist Church houses the original wall tablets displaying the Decalogue, Creed, and Lord's Prayer, as well as a Bible dated 1753.

It was listed on the National Register of Historic Places in 1973.
