= Fort Mattapony =

Archaeological site in Virginia, United States

- U.S. National Register of Historic Places
- Virginia Landmarks Register
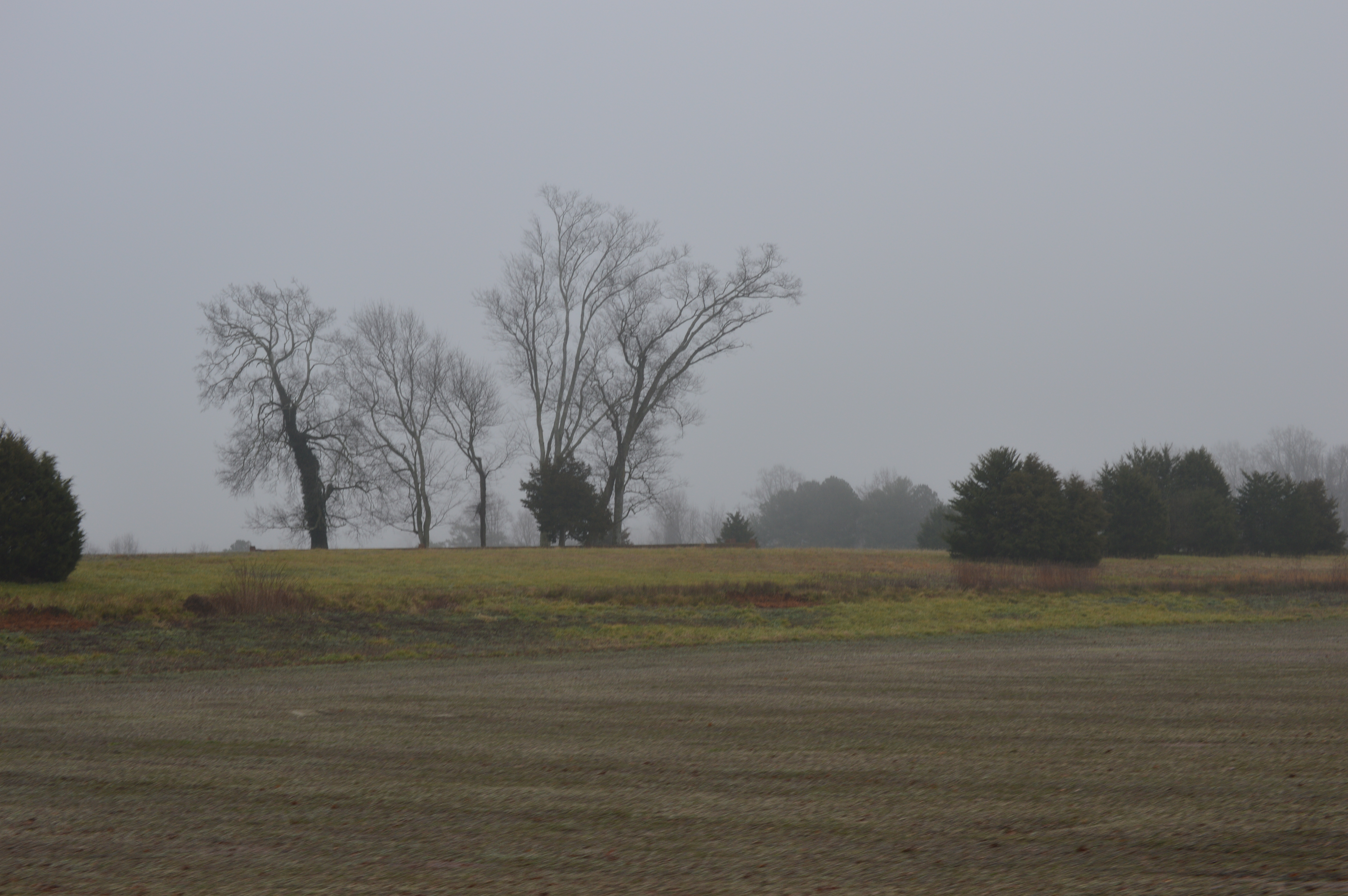
- Overview of the site

- Location within Virginia Location within the United States
- Location: By the cemetery at Locust Grove Plantation, near Walkerton, Virginia
- Coordinates: 37°43′45″N 77°0′42″W
- Area: 1 acre (0.40 ha)
- Built: c. 1653-1682
- NRHP reference No.: 94000547
- VLR No.: 049-0185

Significant dates
- Added to NRHP: August 19, 1994
- Designated VLR: April 20, 1994

Fort Mattapony/Ryefield is a historic archaeological site located near Walkerton, King and Queen County, Virginia. The Fort Mattapony/Ryefield archeological sites, which has been dated archeologically to the fourth quarter of the 17th century, are located in a one-acre area on prominent grassy hilltop overlooking the Mattaponi River, Walkerton and Locust Grove. Collectively designated 44KQ7 in Virginia's official inventory of archeological sites, the site consists of two closely associated components, the Fort Mattapony storehouse and a domestic structure called Ryefield. After abandonment of the fort at the close of the 17th century and the domestic structure by the mid-18th century, a later colonial plantation, Locust Grove, developed in the surrounding area, which continues to be occupied by descendants.

The land on which the Fort Mattapony/Ryefield archaeological sites are located was first patented by Edward Digges in 1653. Digges, who shortly thereafter became Governor of Virginia, deserted his patent, and in 1665 it was granted to Lt. Colonel Thomas Walker, in whose family it has remained ever since.

Both Digges' and Walker's patents refer to the 2,300 acre grant as the 'Mattapony Fort tract,' strongly suggesting that by 1653 a fortification of some sort was, or had been, located wi thin the confines of the property. Documentary research, however, does not indicate that an officially sanctioned fort was ever built on the tract during the first half of the 17th century.

Instead, the Diggs-Walker tract may have been called 'Fort Mattapony' because earlier settlers built a palisaded house, or fort, somewhere on the property. This was the type of fortified home colonists were encouraged to construct for their own defense, due to violation of the Treaty of 1646. This treaty stated that the land on the Northside of the York River was reserved for the Indians, and yet by 1653 settlement had spread both north and westward into that territory. Consequently, the Fort Mattapony tract lay within the frontier interface between the Indians and the English, a likely location for a fortified house.

In April 1679, the Grand Assembly "took into sad and serious consideration the sundry murthers, rapins, and many depredations lately committed and done by the Indians on the inhabitants of the country" and passed an act ordering the establishment of a fort at the head of each of the colony's four major rivers, the Potomac, the Rappahannock, the York, and the James. These forts were to be built above the Indian towns "for the defense of the County against the incursions of the Indian enemy" and were perhaps an official response to the conditions which had preceded Bacon's Rebellion. According to the 1679 Act of Assembly, each fort was to consist of a 22 foot by 60 foot sturdily constructed frame storehouse, built for the use of the men to be garrisoned there and a 10-foot square building to house their ammunition. The fort on the York River was to be located on the Mattaponi River, its northernmost branch, and was called Fort Mattapony.

Fort Mattapony was ordered constructed and outfitted by Captain Richard Johnson, whose home plantation lay between the Mastacock and Pesticock Swamps to the south of Thomas Walker's land. The fact he was charged with that responsibility suggests that the Walkers were not yet occupying the tract and that Johnson was the nearest militia officer.

40 men were originally assigned to Fort Mattapony. These men were to keep watch over their area and interrogate any Indians they encountered. Men from New Kent, York, and one-third of Gloucester County (now King and Queen County) were to supply and complete the garrison at Fort Mattapony. Four Indians native to the vicinity of each fort were to be in attendance at each garrison. All military units were to be completed by June 20, 1679, or two months from the time the act was passed authorizing construction of the forts. One year later, on July 8, 1680, the Executive Council ordered that each garrison be reduced to twenty men, ten of whom would be local militia, and ten, "his Majesty's soldiers." On July 22, 1680, Sir Henry Chickeley offered thirty-two of his soldiers to be divided among the four garrisons. The provincial soldiers they replaced were to be sent home with neither arms nor horses. This reduction of Fort Mattapony may have been in part due to the 1680 peace established between the Haudenosaunee and the English, as well as the poor market price obtained for tobacco. The need for forts and their protection had seemingly lessened, as had the fiscal wherewithal to support them

Fort Mattapony was decommissioned in 1682

It was listed on the National Register of Historic Places in 1994.
