= Northbank (Walkerton, Virginia) =

Historic house in Virginia, United States

- U.S. National Register of Historic Places
- Virginia Landmarks Register
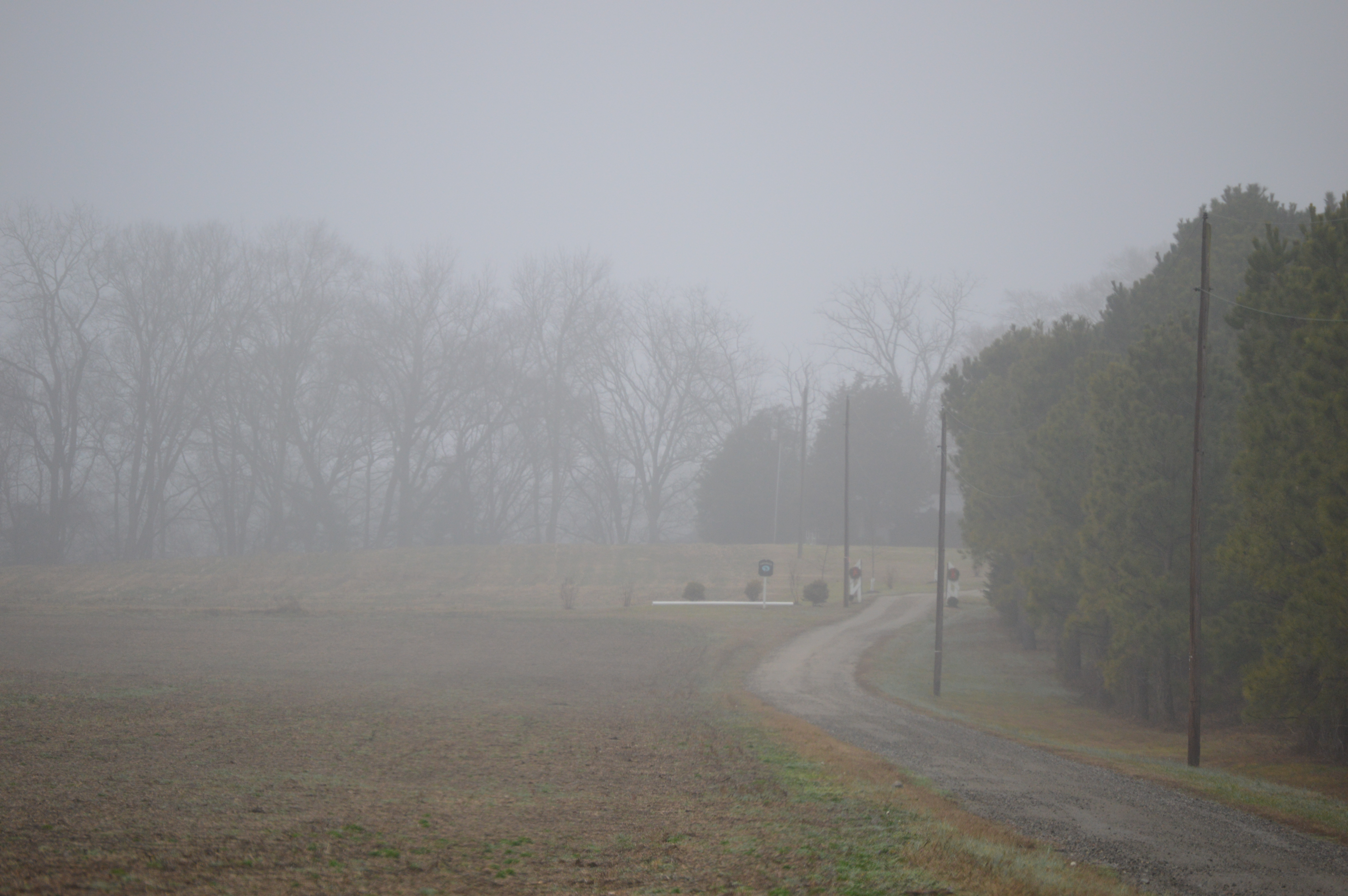
- Driveway to the farmstead

- Location within Virginia Location within the United States
- Location: 453 Northbank Rd., Walkerton, Virginia
- Coordinates: 37°45′51″N 77°4′0″W
- Area: 156 acres (63 ha)
- Built: 1722, 1827, 1863, 1911
- Architectural style: Federal
- NRHP reference No.: 06000121
- VLR No.: 049-0051

Significant dates
- Added to NRHP: March 7, 2006
- Designated VLR: December 7, 2005

Northbank is a historic plantation house located near Walkerton, King and Queen County, Virginia. The first section was built in 1722, with additions dated to 1827, 1863 and 1911. It is a 2 1/2-story, frame and clapboard home on a brick foundation. Also on the property are the contributing smokehouse, kitchen house, pole barn shed, and the family cemetery. The house remained in the same family from 1722 to 1990.

It was listed on the National Register of Historic Places in 2006.
