= Upper Church, Stratton Major Parish =

Historic church in Virginia, US

- U.S. National Register of Historic Places
- Virginia Landmarks Register
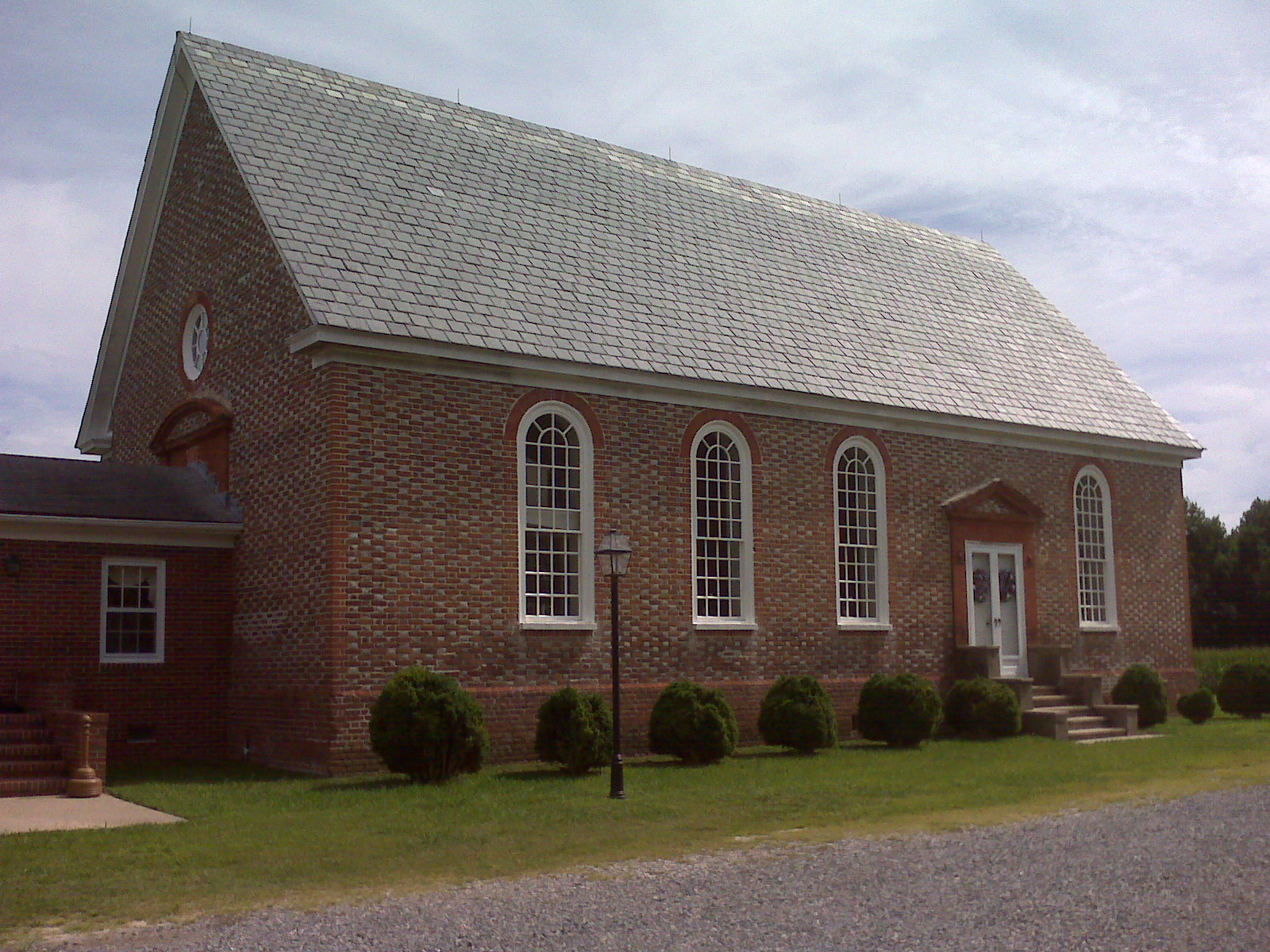
- Upper Church, Stratton Major Parish, July 2011

- Location within Virginia Location within the United States
- Location: SE of Shanghai on VA 14, near Shanghai, Virginia
- Coordinates: 37°36′10″N 76°46′14″W
- Area: 10 acres (4.0 ha)
- Built: c. 1724-1729
- Architectural style: Colonial
- NRHP reference No.: 73002030
- VLR No.: 049-0050

Significant dates
- Added to NRHP: April 2, 1973
- Designated VLR: October 17, 1972

Upper Church, Stratton Major Parish is a historic Episcopal church located near Shanghai, King and Queen County, Virginia. It was built between about 1724 and 1729, and is a one-story, rectangular, brick structure, measuring 33 feet, 9 inches, long by 64 feet. The church is topped by a steeply pitched gable roof with a box cornice and cornice returns. The church was restored after a fire gutted the interior in the 1840s. The church has been used by Baptists and later Methodists since the early-19th century.

It was listed on the National Register of Historic Places in 1973.
