= Marriott School =

Historic school building in Virginia, US

- U.S. National Register of Historic Places
- Virginia Landmarks Register
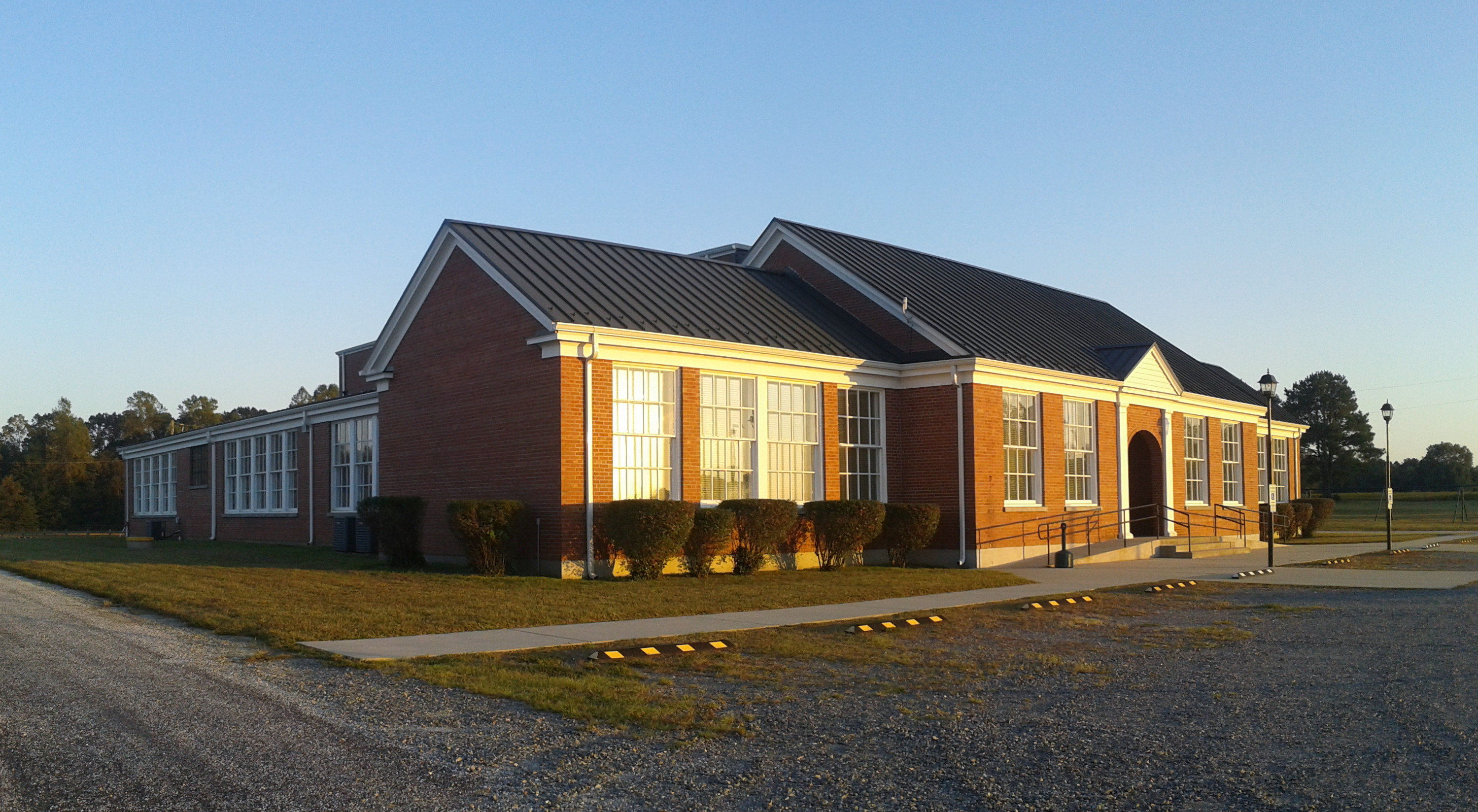
- Marriott School at dusk, October, 2016

- Location within Virginia Location within the United States
- Location: 450 Newtown Rd., St. Stephens Church, Virginia
- Coordinates: 37°48′28″N 77°03′15″W
- Area: 11 acres (4.5 ha)
- Built: 1938
- Architect: State Dept. of Education
- Architectural style: Colonial Revival
- NRHP reference No.: 07000052
- VLR No.: 049-5010

Significant dates
- Added to NRHP: February 13, 2007
- Designated VLR: September 6, 2006

Marriott School is a historic school building located near St. Stephens Church, King and Queen County, Virginia. The original section was built in 1938, and is a one-story, five-bay, brick structure, flanked by a pair of four-bay wings in the Colonial Revival style. The front entrance is flanked by Doric order pilasters supporting a triangular entablature, the pediment of which is stuccoed. An addition was built in 1959. The school closed in 1992, and subsequently housed the King & Queen Branch of the Pamunkey Regional Library. The library moved to a new location in 2001.

It was listed on the National Register of Historic Places in 2007.
