= Hillsboro, King and Queen County, Virginia =

Hillsboro, Virginia
- Unincorporated community
- Location within the Commonwealth of Virginia Hillsboro (the United States)
- Coordinates: 37°42′37″N 76°58′58″W
- Country: United States
- State: Virginia
- County: King and Queen
- Time zone: UTC−5 (Eastern (EST))
  - Summer (DST): UTC−4 (EDT)

Hillsboro is an unincorporated community in King and Queen County, Virginia, United States.
