= Shanghai, Virginia =

Unincorporated community in Virginia, United States

- Unincorporated community
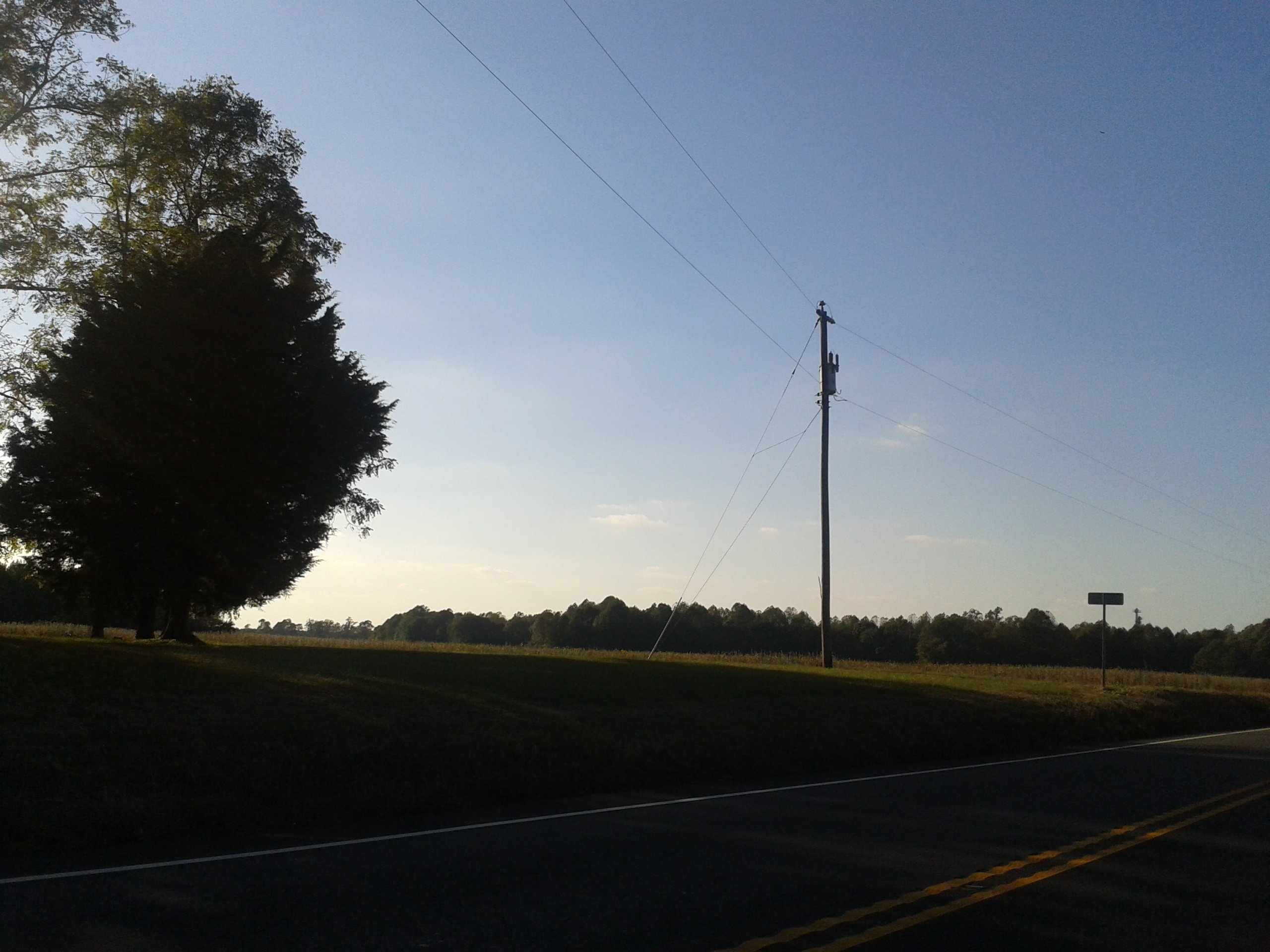
- Shanghai, Virginia, late afternoon, October 2016

- Location within the Commonwealth of Virginia Shanghai (the United States)
- Coordinates: 37°36′30″N 76°46′43″W
- Country: United States
- State: Virginia
- County: King and Queen

Population (2020)
  - Total: 1,199
- Time zone: UTC−5 (Eastern (EST))
  - Summer (DST): UTC−4 (EDT)

Shanghai is an unincorporated community in King and Queen County, Virginia, United States.

The Upper Church, Stratton Major Parish was listed on the National Register of Historic Places in 1973.
