= Cumnor, Virginia =

Unincorporated community in Virginia, United States

- Unincorporated community
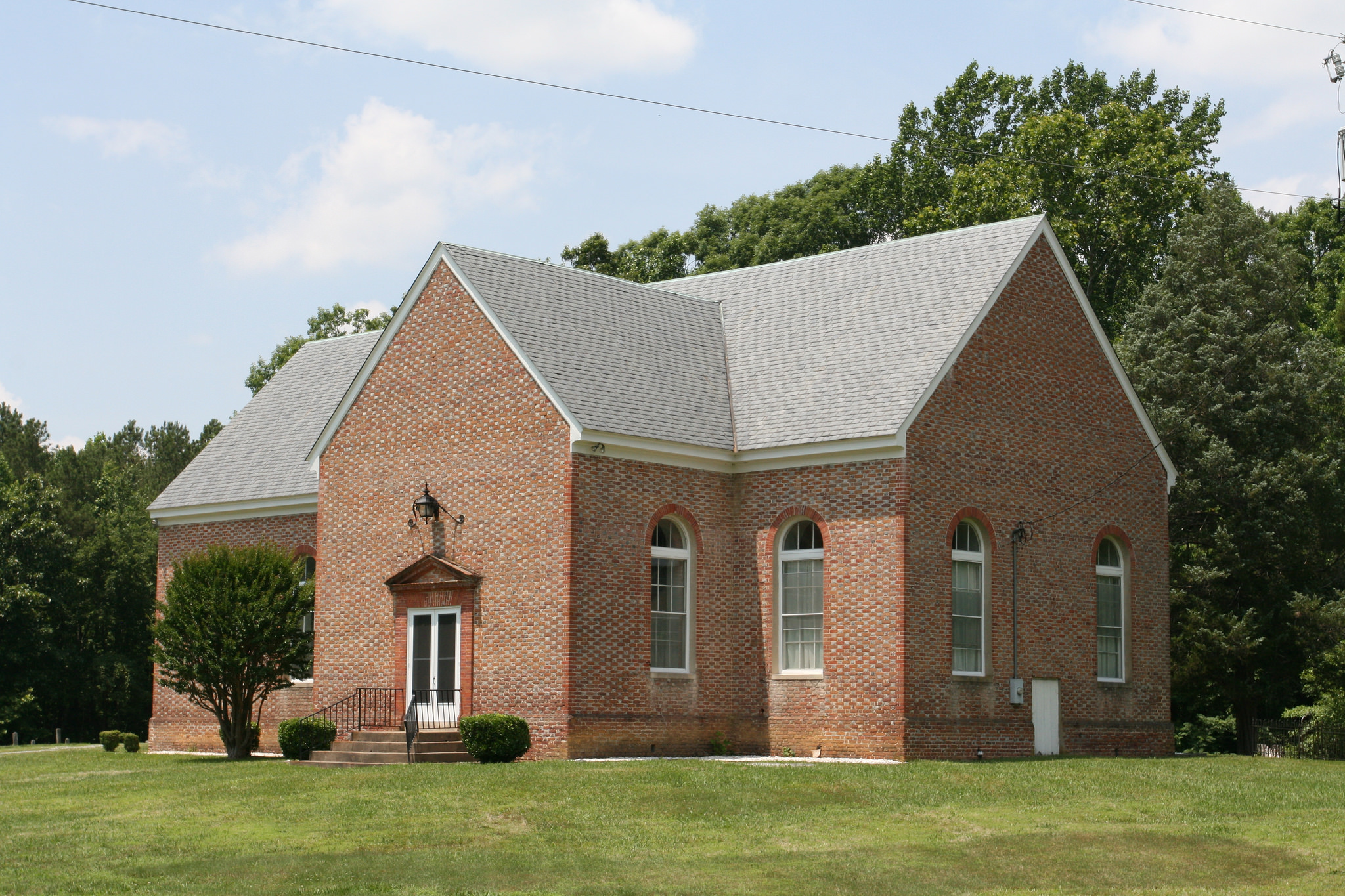
- Mattaponi Church, c. 1734

- Location within the Commonwealth of Virginia Cumnor (the United States)
- Coordinates: 37°43′31″N 76°53′00″W
- Country: United States
- State: Virginia
- County: King and Queen
- Time zone: UTC−5 (Eastern (EST))
  - Summer (DST): UTC−4 (EDT)

Cumnor is an unincorporated community in King and Queen County, Virginia, United States.

The Mattaponi Church was listed on the National Register of Historic Places in 1973.
