= Bewdley (St. Stephens Church, Virginia) =

Historic house in Virginia, United States

- U.S. National Register of Historic Places
- Virginia Landmarks Register
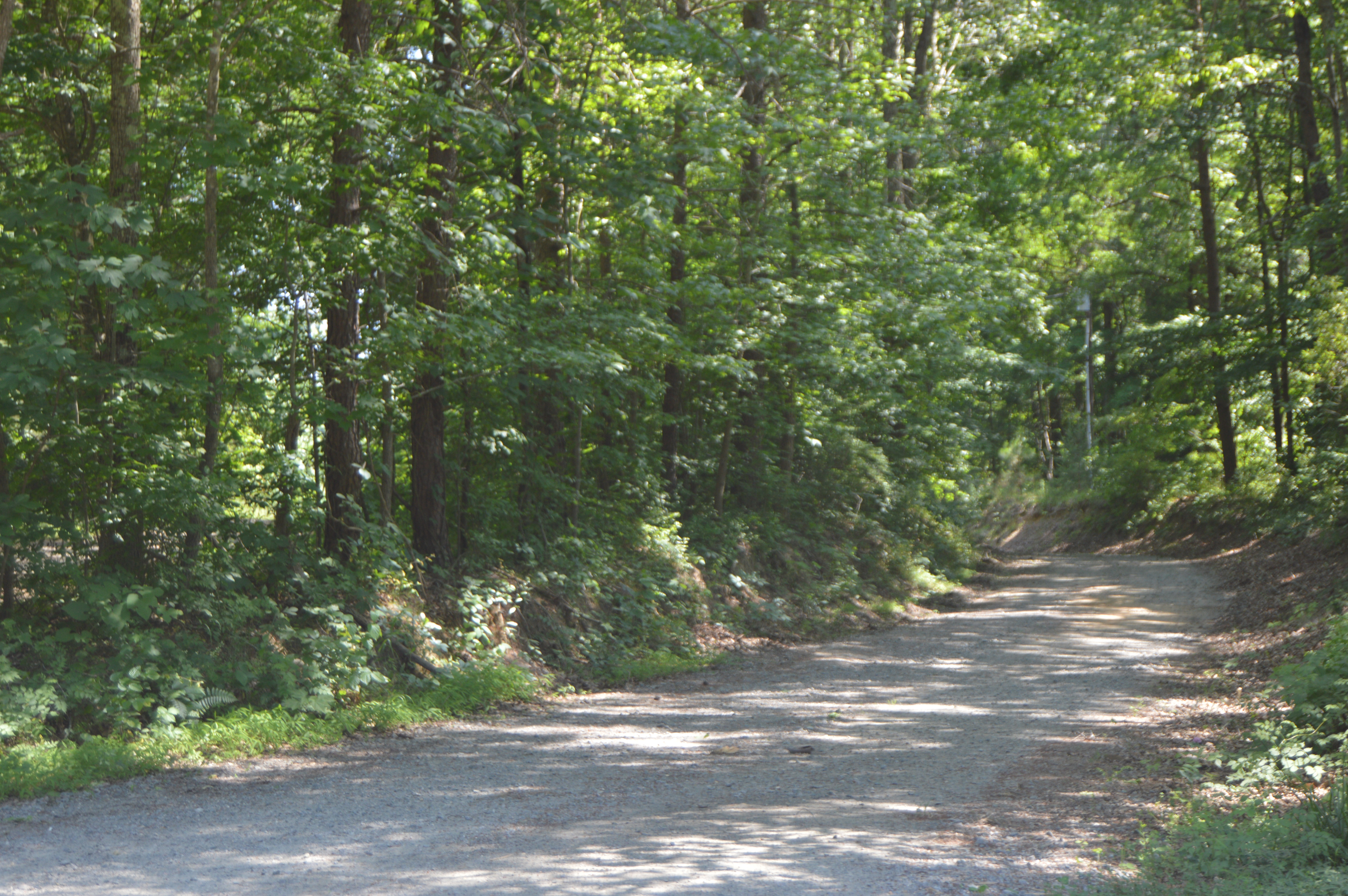
- Property entrance

- Location within Virginia Location within the United States
- Location: South of St. Stephens Church on the Mattaponi River
- Coordinates: 37°45′09″N 77°03′54″W
- Area: 52 acres (21 ha)
- Built: c. 1760
- NRHP reference No.: 78003024
- VLR No.: 049-0004

Significant dates
- Added to NRHP: November 16, 1978
- Designated VLR: July 18, 1978

Bewdley is a historic plantation house located near St. Stephens Church, King and Queen County, Virginia. It was built in the third quarter of the 18th century, and is a large two-story, L-shaped brick dwelling. It has a hipped roof with a 20th-century modillion cornice. The front facade features an early 19th-century pedimented dwarf portico supported on four Tuscan order columns.

It was listed on the National Register of Historic Places in 1978.
