= King and Queen Courthouse Green Historic District =

Historic district in Virginia, United States

- U.S. National Register of Historic Places
- U.S. Historic district
- Virginia Landmarks Register
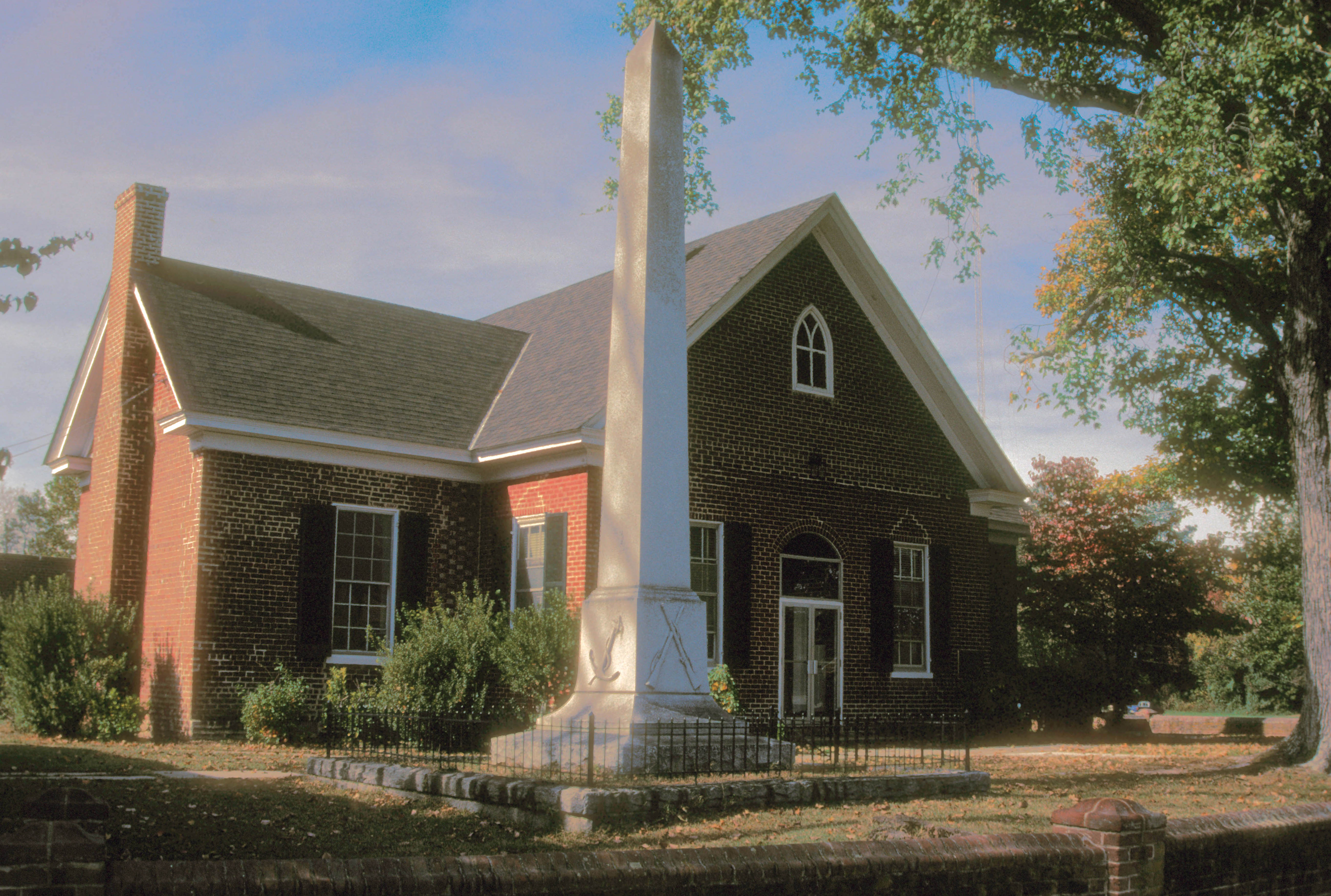
- King and Queen Courthouse, April 1971

- Location within Virginia Location within the United States
- Location: Jct. of Allen Circle and Courthouse Landing Rd., NW of Shacklefords, at King and Queen Court House, near Shacklefords, Virginia
- Coordinates: 37°40′12″N 76°52′44″W
- Area: 11.5 acres (4.7 ha)
- Built: 1864
- Architectural style: Late 19th And Early 20th Century American Movements, Late Victorian, Federal
- NRHP reference No.: 98001162
- VLR No.: 049-5001

Significant dates
- Added to NRHP: September 24, 1998
- Designated VLR: June 17, 1998

King and Queen Courthouse Green Historic District is a national historic district located at King and Queen Court House, near Shacklefords, King and Queen County, Virginia. It encompasses eight contributing buildings, seven contributing structures, and two contributing objects in the county seat of King and Queen County. The district includes a small courthouse compound with a courthouse, clerk's office, and county jail (partially delineated by a brick wall), a granite monument and brick wall, a hotel / tavern building, a school, a specialty store building (currently used to house state offices), and a residence on the site of another hotel and tavern.

It was listed on the National Register of Historic Places in 1998.

== Confederate Monument ==
The granite obelisk (pictured) was erected in 1913 and is located on the old court house grounds. The monument displays various symbols of the war and the below inscription:

To The Confederate Soldiers

And Sailors of King and Queen
County Virginia 1861-1865
Fate Denied Them Victory But Gave
Them The Love And Veneration Of
Their Native Land, The Wonder
And Admiration Of The World
