= Kempsville (Shacklefords, Virginia) =

Historic house in Virginia, United States

- U.S. National Register of Historic Places
- Virginia Landmarks Register
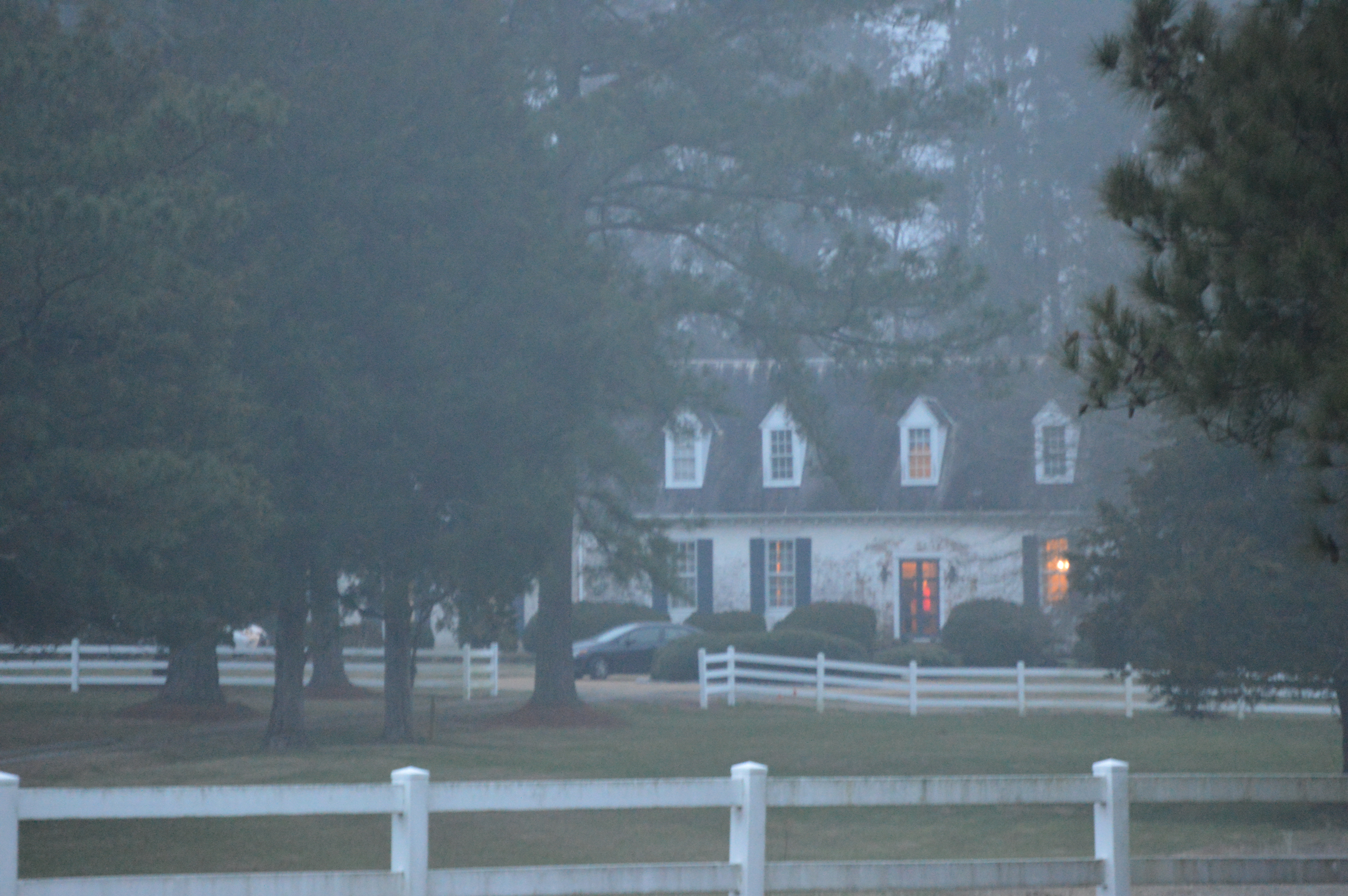
- Roadside view of Kempsville

- Location within Virginia Location within the United States
- Location: E of Shacklefords on VA 33, near Shacklefords, Virginia
- Coordinates: 37°33′38″N 76°38′18″W
- Area: 60 acres (24 ha)
- Built: 1787
- Architectural style: Center Hall Plan
- NRHP reference No.: 78003018
- VLR No.: 036-0015

Significant dates
- Added to NRHP: December 21, 1978
- Designated VLR: September 20, 1977

Kempsville is a historic home located near Shacklefords, Gloucester County, Virginia. It was built about 1787, and is a 1 1/2-story, four-bay, gable roofed brick dwelling. with a single pile, central passage plan. It has a 1 1/2-story wing and rear ell. It features T-shaped chimneys.

It was added to the National Register of Historic Places in 1978.
