= Walkerton, Virginia =

Unincorporated community in Virginia, United States

- Unincorporated community
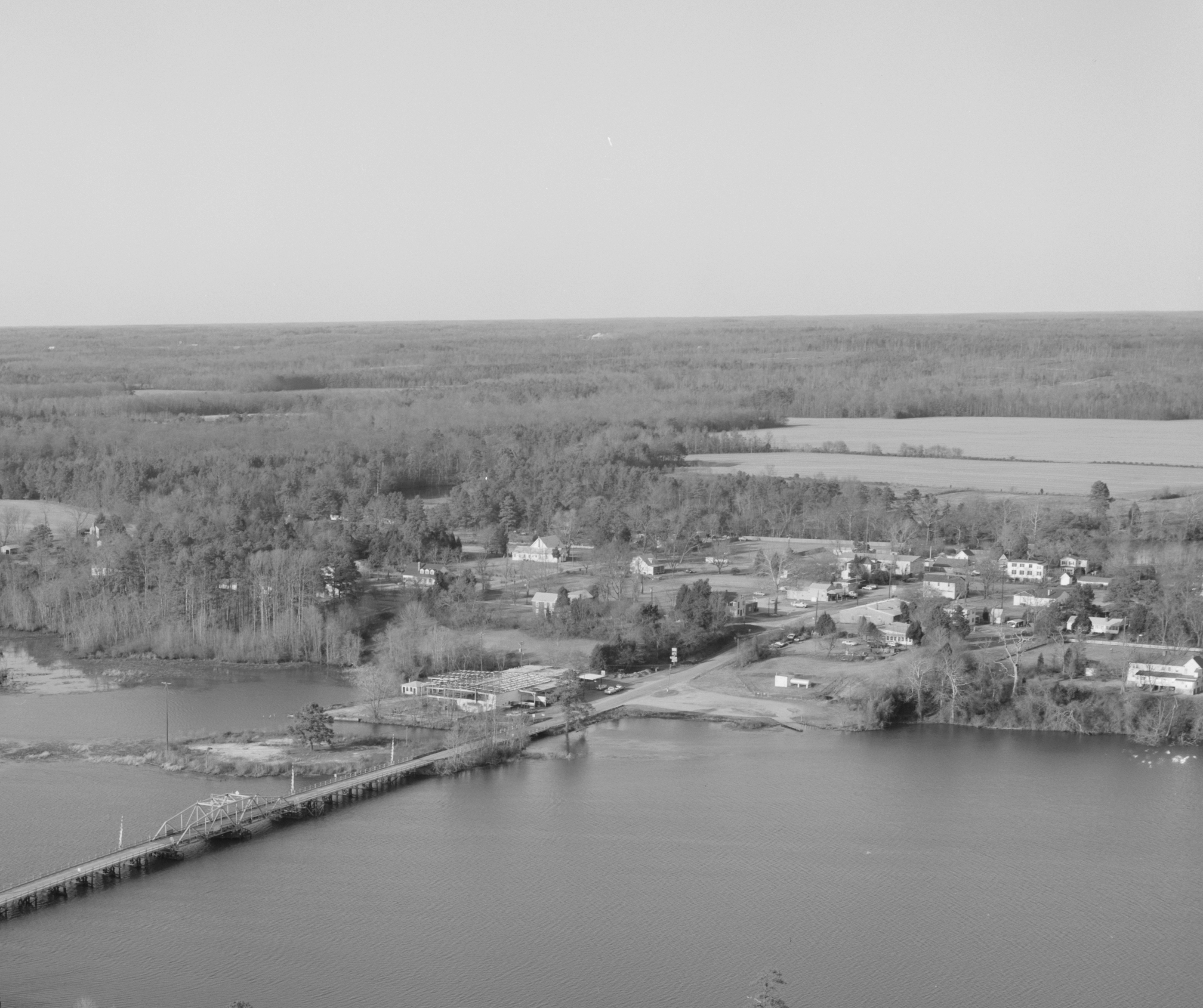

- Location within the Commonwealth of Virginia Walkerton (the United States)
- Coordinates: 37°43′35″N 77°01′22″W
- Country: United States
- State: Virginia
- County: King and Queen
- Time zone: UTC−5 (Eastern (EST))
  - Summer (DST): UTC−4 (EDT)

Walkerton is an unincorporated community in King and Queen County, Virginia, United States.

Fort Mattapony, Hillsborough, and Northbank are listed on the National Register of Historic Places.

== Climate ==
The climate in this area is characterized by hot, humid summers and generally mild to cool winters. According to the Köppen Climate Classification system, Walkerton has a humid subtropical climate, abbreviated "Cfa" on climate maps.

Climate data for Walkerton 2 NW, Virginia (1991–2020 normals, extremes 1932–present)
Month	Jan	Feb	Mar	Apr	May	Jun	Jul	Aug	Sep	Oct	Nov	Dec	Year
Record high °F (°C)	81 (27)	83 (28)	91 (33)	100 (38)	99 (37)	107 (42)	108 (42)	104 (40)	103 (39)	101 (38)	87 (31)	83 (28)	108 (42)
Mean daily maximum °F (°C)	48.6 (9.2)	52.3 (11.3)	60.4 (15.8)	71.6 (22.0)	77.6 (25.3)	84.9 (29.4)	88.4 (31.3)	86.9 (30.5)	81.2 (27.3)	71.5 (21.9)	60.9 (16.1)	51.7 (10.9)	69.7 (20.9)
Daily mean °F (°C)	39.0 (3.9)	41.7 (5.4)	49.1 (9.5)	59.2 (15.1)	67.2 (19.6)	75.0 (23.9)	78.9 (26.1)	77.3 (25.2)	71.4 (21.9)	60.5 (15.8)	50.1 (10.1)	42.1 (5.6)	59.3 (15.2)
Mean daily minimum °F (°C)	29.4 (−1.4)	31.1 (−0.5)	37.8 (3.2)	46.9 (8.3)	56.8 (13.8)	65.0 (18.3)	69.4 (20.8)	67.8 (19.9)	61.6 (16.4)	49.6 (9.8)	39.3 (4.1)	32.4 (0.2)	48.9 (9.4)
Record low °F (°C)	−15 (−26)	−12 (−24)	6 (−14)	19 (−7)	28 (−2)	37 (3)	45 (7)	42 (6)	33 (1)	22 (−6)	8 (−13)	−7 (−22)	−15 (−26)
Average precipitation inches (mm)	3.19 (81)	2.85 (72)	4.03 (102)	3.20 (81)	3.84 (98)	4.18 (106)	4.78 (121)	4.37 (111)	4.44 (113)	3.78 (96)	3.29 (84)	3.69 (94)	45.64 (1,159)
Average snowfall inches (cm)	3.4 (8.6)	2.4 (6.1)	1.0 (2.5)	0.0 (0.0)	0.0 (0.0)	0.0 (0.0)	0.0 (0.0)	0.0 (0.0)	0.0 (0.0)	0.0 (0.0)	0.1 (0.25)	0.9 (2.3)	7.8 (20)
Average precipitation days (≥ 0.01 in)	9.2	8.7	10.0	9.7	10.5	9.6	9.8	8.1	8.0	7.3	8.7	10.2	109.8
Average snowy days (≥ 0.1 in)	1.5	0.9	0.6	0.1	0.0	0.0	0.0	0.0	0.0	0.0	0.1	0.5	3.7
Source: NOAA
