= Hillsborough (East Indiaman) =

Two East Indiamen of the East India Company (EIC), have borne the name Hillsborough, named for Hillsborough:

- Hillsborough (1774 ship) – launched in 1774. She made two complete voyages for the EIC; A Spanish fleet captured her in 1780. The Spanish Navy took her into service until 1794, when she was sold for breaking up.
- Hillsborough (1783 EIC ship) – launched in 1783. She made seven voyages for the EIC before she was sold. She became a whaler and was broken up in 1804.
