= Providence Plantation and Farm =

Historic house in Virginia, United States

- U.S. National Register of Historic Places
- Virginia Landmarks Register
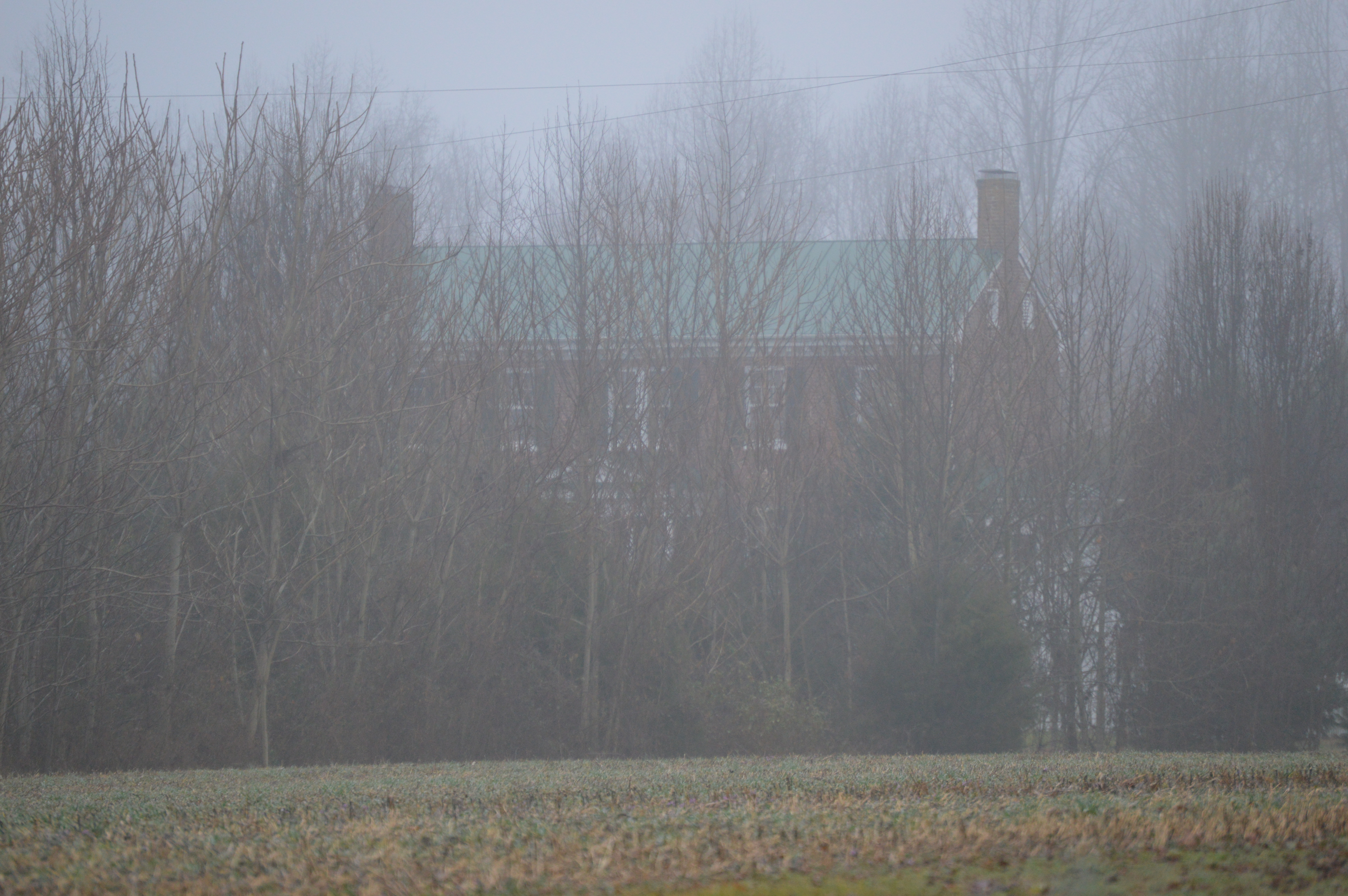
- Farmhouse seen through the trees

- Location within Virginia Location within the United States
- Location: 1302 Roundabout Rte., Newtown, Virginia
- Coordinates: 37°54′56″N 77°10′36″W
- Area: 6.5 acres (2.6 ha)
- Built: c. 1826, c. 1840
- Built by: William and Susan Dew, et al.
- Architectural style: Federal
- NRHP reference No.: 09000689
- VLR No.: 049-0063

Significant dates
- Added to NRHP: September 3, 2009
- Designated VLR: June 18, 2009

Providence Plantation and Farm, also known as Fogg House and Farm, is a historic plantation house located near Newtown in King and Queen County, Virginia. The two-story, 3-bay Federal style brick main house was built about 1826 and expanded circa 1840. Also on the privately held property, demonstrating the changes over time as the plantation which once encompassed about 1299 acres shrunk to the listed 6.47 acres, are the contributing two-story Reconstruction-era carriage house, and Great Depression-era hen laying house, two-story sweet potato shed, and mechanic's shop.

== History ==
Thomas R. Dew, who fought in the Revolutionary War, established a plantation he called Dewsville in King and Queen County, Virginia. He had five sons, and in 1826 built this house as a wedding present for his eldest son, William, who would expand it in the 1840s. Another son, Thomas Roderick Dew, became a professor and president of the College of William and Mary in Williamsburg, but predeceased his father and elder brother.

By 1830, Dr. William Dew operated this plantation using 17 enslaved people (8 males and 9 females). In 1837, Dr. Dew bought an additional 200 acres from his father, adding to the 500 acres given to him at his wedding, and he may have received an additional 511 acres and 20 slaves upon his father's death in 1849. Dr. Dew donated some land to construct Horeb Church nearby and died in 1854. At his death, his estate included two farms totaling 1211 acres and more than 60 slaves. On the eve of the Civil War, Dr. Dew's widow, 3 daughters and son Benjamin Dew lived on the property. Three sons fought in the conflict as Confederate officers. Eleven slave quarters were noted in the 1860 slave census. After the Civil War, Mrs. Dew and her daughters barely managed to operate the plantation with the help of five hired laborers. Descendants sold the plantation in 1908. Several different families owned the property in the next 13 years, before it was acquired by the Fogg family, whose members modernized it during the next six decades, and some of whom live nearby in newer houses on land once owned by Capt. Thomas Dew. Although the manor house sustained damage over the years (especially when it was vacant for a short period of time), more remained of the original structure than in other houses of the area and era. It was acquired and restored by the Norton family in the 1980s-90s. The Stuart family furthered this process, and it was named a Virginia Historic Landmark and placed on the National Register of Historic Places in 2009. It is now owned by the Martin family.
