= Newtown, King and Queen County, Virginia =

Unincorporated community in Virginia, United States

Newtown, Virginia
- Unincorporated community
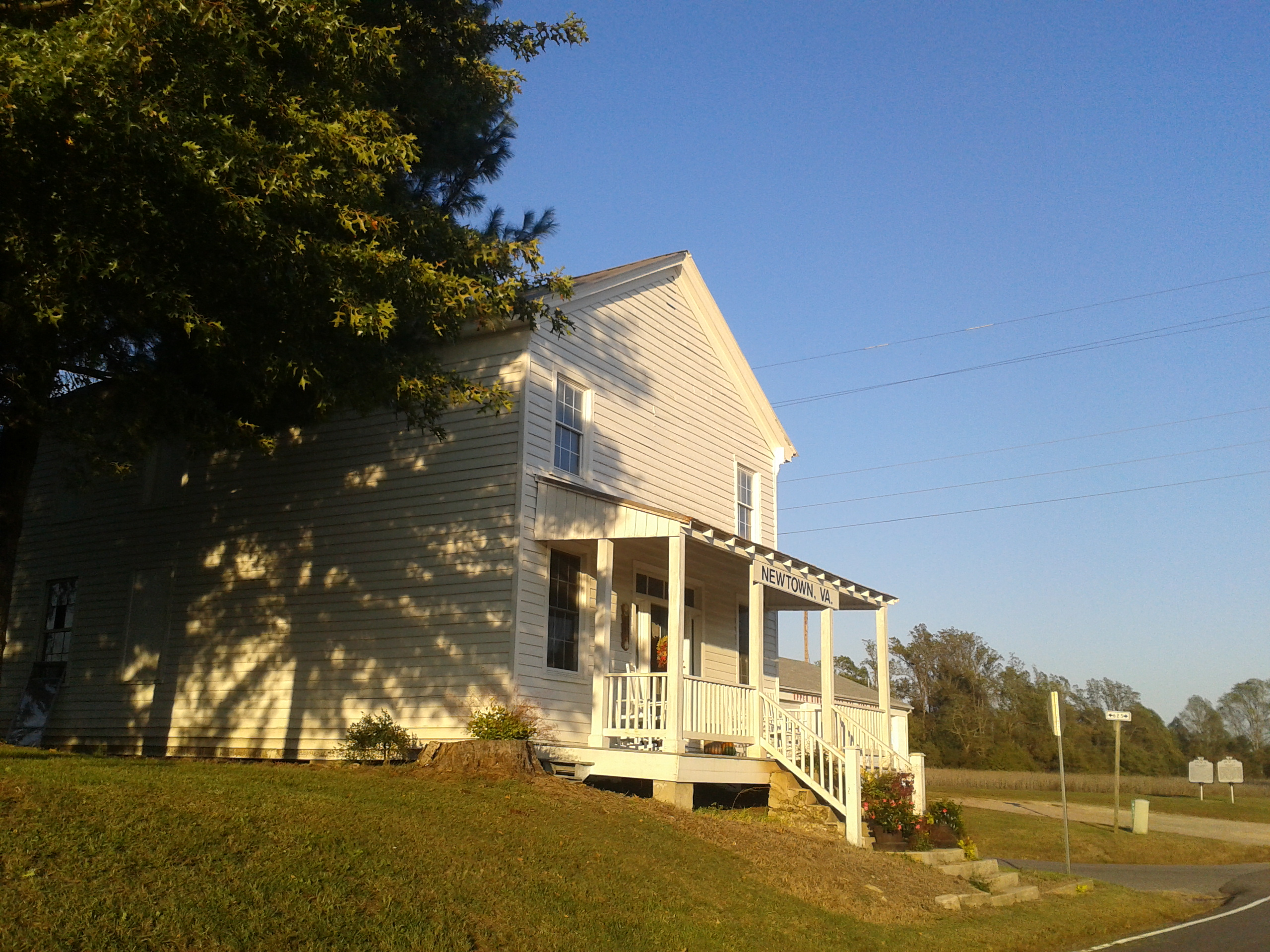
- Post office in Newtown, Virginia

- Location within the Commonwealth of Virginia Newtown (the United States)
- Coordinates: 37°54′48″N 77°07′44″W
- Country: United States
- State: Virginia
- County: King and Queen
- Elevation: 183 ft (56 m)
- Time zone: UTC−5 (Eastern (EST))
  - Summer (DST): UTC−4 (EDT)
- ZIP codes: 23126
- GNIS feature ID: 1471529

Newtown is an unincorporated community in King and Queen County, Virginia, United States.

The Newtown Historic District and Providence Plantation and Farm are listed on the National Register of Historic Places.

Newtown is known today for its championship sand drag racing track (sanctioned 300 foot).
