= Shacklefords, Virginia =

Unincorporated community in Virginia, United States

- Unincorporated community
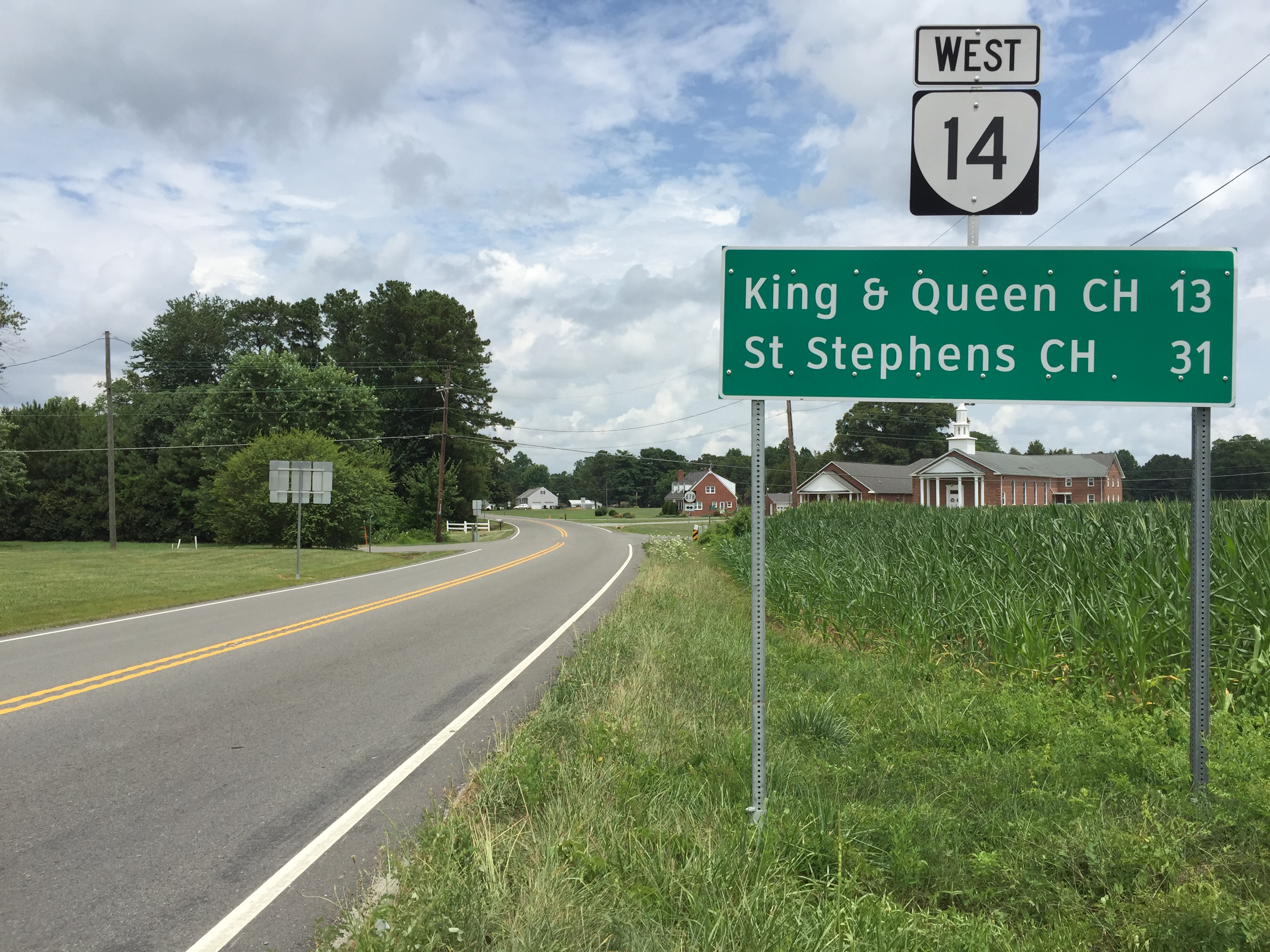
- View west along Virginia State Route 14 (The Trail) at Virginia State Route 33 (Lewis B Puller Memorial Highway) in Shacklefords

- Location within the Commonwealth of Virginia Shacklefords (the United States)
- Coordinates: 37°33′06″N 76°43′56″W
- Country: United States
- State: Virginia
- County: King and Queen
- Time zone: UTC−5 (Eastern (EST))
  - Summer (DST): UTC−4 (EDT)

Shacklefords is an unincorporated community in King and Queen County, Virginia, United States. It derives its name from the Shackleford (or Shackelford) family, of whom the immigrant ancestor to the Virginia colony was Roger Shackelford, who was born in Old Alresford in the English county of Hampshire in 1629. (The orthography of the name of Roger Shackelford's descendants varies, sometimes spelled 'el' and sometimes 'le.')

The immigrant Roger Shackelford was first mentioned in Gloucester County, in a grant of land in 1658. The family likely took its name from the village of Shackleford, in the English county of Surrey, which adjoins Hampshire and is not far from London. A North Carolina barrier island, Shackleford Banks, is named for descendants of the family, as is Shackelford County, Texas. An Orange, Virginia branch of the Shackelford family also counts President Thomas Jefferson and his wife Martha Wayles as ancestors.

The post office in Shacklefords (which was at one stage spelled with an apostrophe) was established in 1800.

Dixon, Kempsville, and King and Queen Courthouse Green Historic District are listed on the National Register of Historic Places.
