= St. Stephens Church, Virginia =

Unincorporated community in Virginia, United States

- Unincorporated community
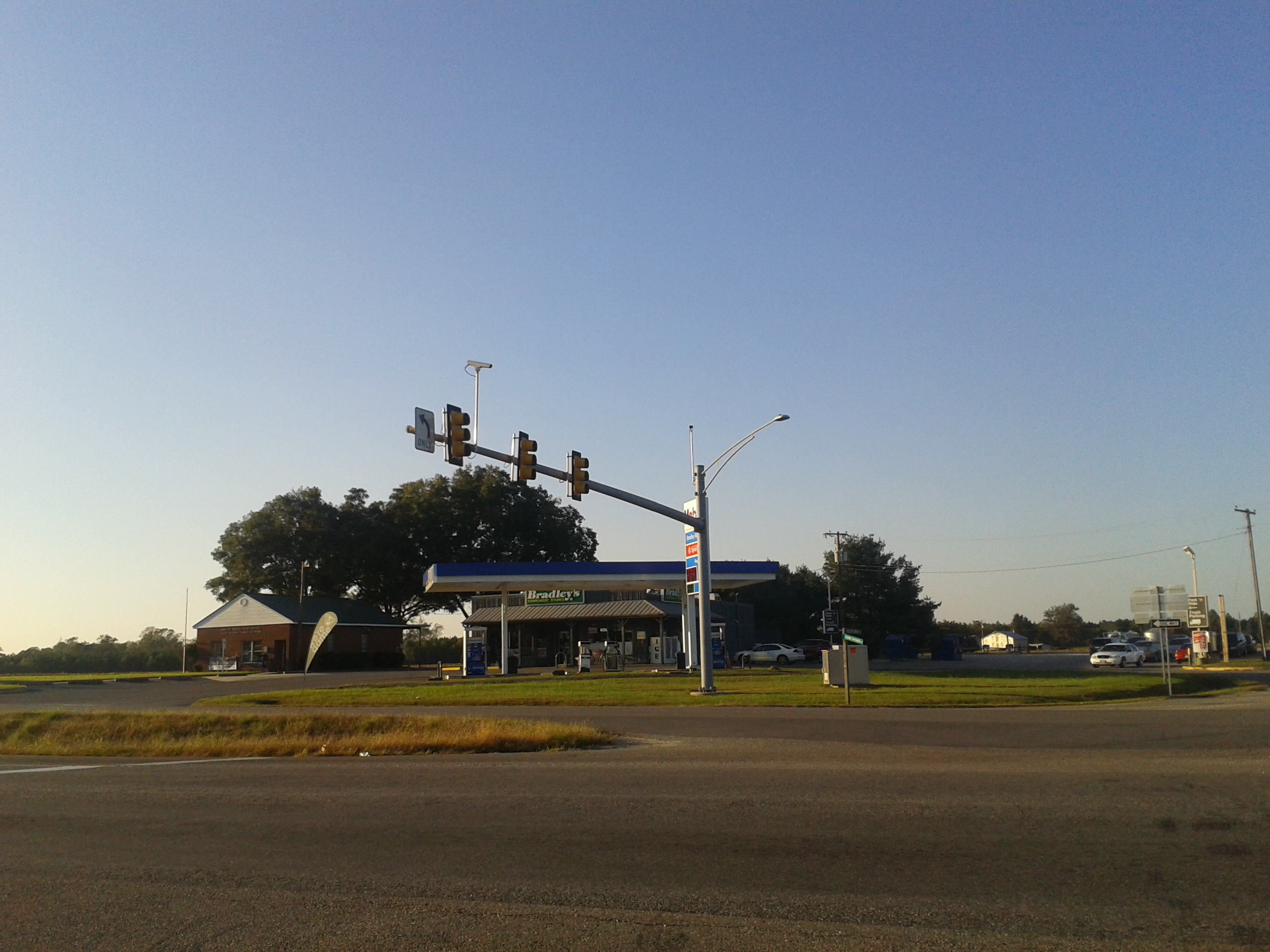
- Gas station and traffic light at St. Stephens Church, October, 2016

- Location within the Commonwealth of Virginia St. Stephens Church (the United States)
- Coordinates: 37°48′10″N 77°3′20″W
- Country: United States
- State: Virginia
- County: King and Queen
- Time zone: UTC−5 (Eastern (EST))
  - Summer (DST): UTC−4 (EDT)

St. Stephens Church is an unincorporated community in King and Queen County, Virginia, United States.

Plantation houses Bewdley and Farmington, and the Marriott School, are listed on the National Register of Historic Places.
