= Hillsborough (Walkerton, Virginia) =

Historic house in Virginia, United States

- U.S. National Register of Historic Places
- Virginia Landmarks Register
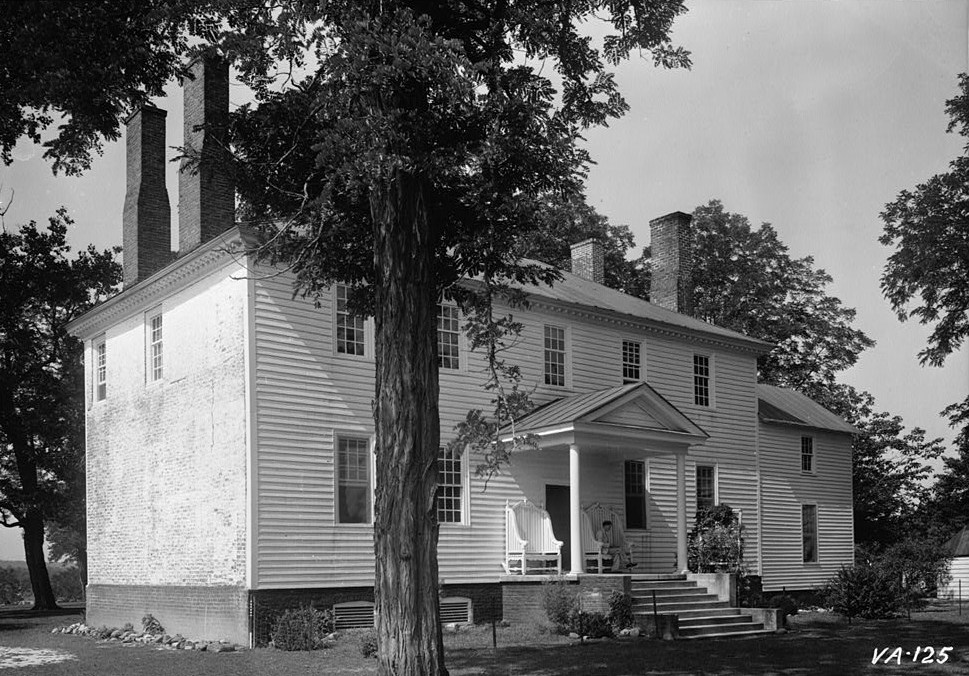
- Hillsborough, HABS Photo

- Location within Virginia Location within the United States
- Location: 2 mi. SE of Walkerton off SR 633, near Walkerton, Virginia
- Coordinates: 37°42′50″N 76°58′59″W
- Area: 250 acres (100 ha)
- NRHP reference No.: 71000984
- VLR No.: 049-0031

Significant dates
- Added to NRHP: September 22, 1971
- Designated VLR: March 2, 1971

Hillsborough is a historic plantation house located near Walkerton, King and Queen County, Virginia. It was built in the mid-18th century, and is a two-story, five-bay, brick and frame dwelling. It has a hipped roof and a frame two-story wing. Also on the property is the contributing two-story brick storehouse.

It was listed on the National Register of Historic Places in 1971.
