= King and Queen Court House, Virginia =

King and Queen Court House
- Census-designated place
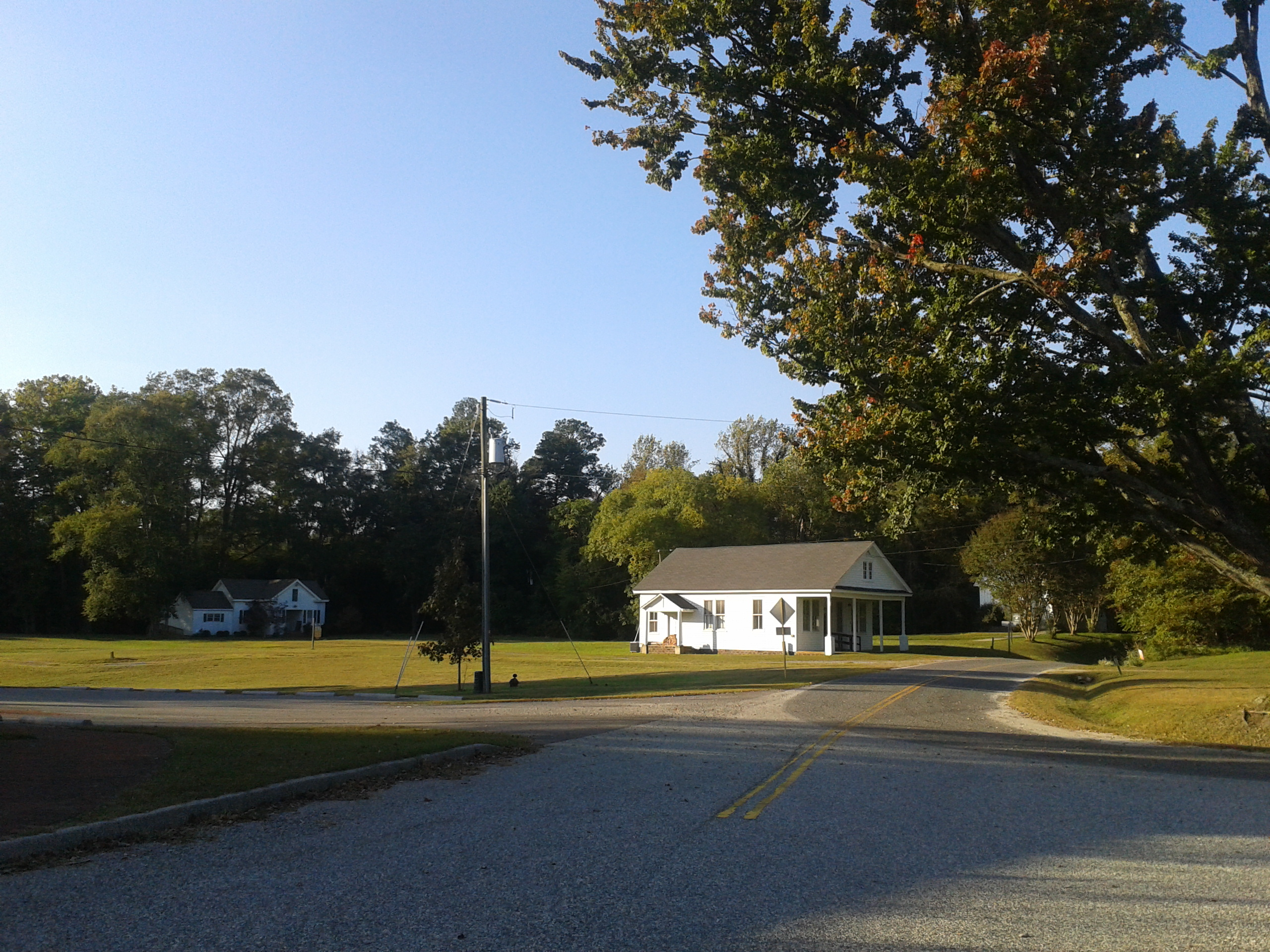
- Central King and Queen Courthouse, October, 2016

- Location within Virginia and the United States King and Queen Court House (the United States)
- Coordinates: 37°40′12″N 76°52′39″W
- Country: United States
- State: Virginia
- County: King and Queen

Area
  - Total: 1.23 sq mi (3.19 km^{2})
  - Land: 1.23 sq mi (3.18 km^{2})
  - Water: 0.0039 sq mi (0.01 km^{2})
- Elevation: 27 ft (8.2 m)

Population (2020)
  - Total: 82
  - Density: 69/sq mi (26.7/km^{2})
- Time zone: UTC−5 (Eastern (EST))
  - Summer (DST): UTC−4 (EDT)
- ZIP code: 23085
- FIPS code: 51-42536
- GNIS feature ID: 1498499

King and Queen Court House is a census-designated place (CDP) in, and the county seat of King and Queen County, Virginia, United States. As of the 2020 census, King and Queen Court House had a population of 82. The community runs along State Route 14, on the north side of the valley of the Mattaponi River. King and Queen Court House is the location of Central High School, a post office, several businesses, and a government complex that includes the county's old and new court houses.

== History ==
The courthouse dates from circa 1750. Union troops burned the building on March 10, 1864, during the American Civil War, but it was repaired and is still in service. On June 20, 1863, scouts of Confederate Brigadier General Montgomery Dent Corse reported a raiding party, 300 strong, burning and destroying the community.

== King and Queen Courthouse Tavern Museum ==
Renovation of the historic Fary Tavern began in December 1999, and the King and Queen Courthouse Tavern Museum officially opened to the public in May 2001. The museum's mission is to be an archive, museum and cultural center for King and Queen County history. The King and Queen Historical Society operates the Courthouse Tavern Museum in cooperative partnership with King and Queen County.

== Demographics ==
Historical population
Census	Pop.	Note	%±
2010	85		—
2020	82		−3.5%
U.S. Decennial Census; 2000 2010

King and Queen Court House was first listed as a census designated place in the 2010 U.S. census.

=== Racial and ethnic composition ===
King and Queen Court House CDP, Virginia – Racial and ethnic composition Note: the US Census treats Hispanic/Latino as an ethnic category. This table excludes Latinos from the racial categories and assigns them to a separate category. Hispanics/Latinos may be of any race.
Race / Ethnicity (NH = Non-Hispanic)	Pop 2010	Pop 2020	% 2010	% 2020
White alone (NH)	49	44	57.65%	53.66%
Black or African American alone (NH)	35	27	41.18%	32.93%
Native American or Alaska Native alone (NH)	0	0	0.00%	0.00%
Asian alone (NH)	0	0	0.00%	0.00%
Native Hawaiian or Pacific Islander alone (NH)	0	1	0.00%	1.22%
Other race alone (NH)	0	0	0.00%	0.00%
Mixed race or Multiracial (NH)	1	7	1.18%	8.54%
Hispanic or Latino (any race)	0	3	0.00%	3.66%
Total	85	82	100.00%	100.00%

== Education ==
The sole school district in the county is King and Queen County Public Schools.

== See also ==
- King and Queen Courthouse Green Historic District
