= King and Queen County, Virginia =

County in Virginia, United States

- County
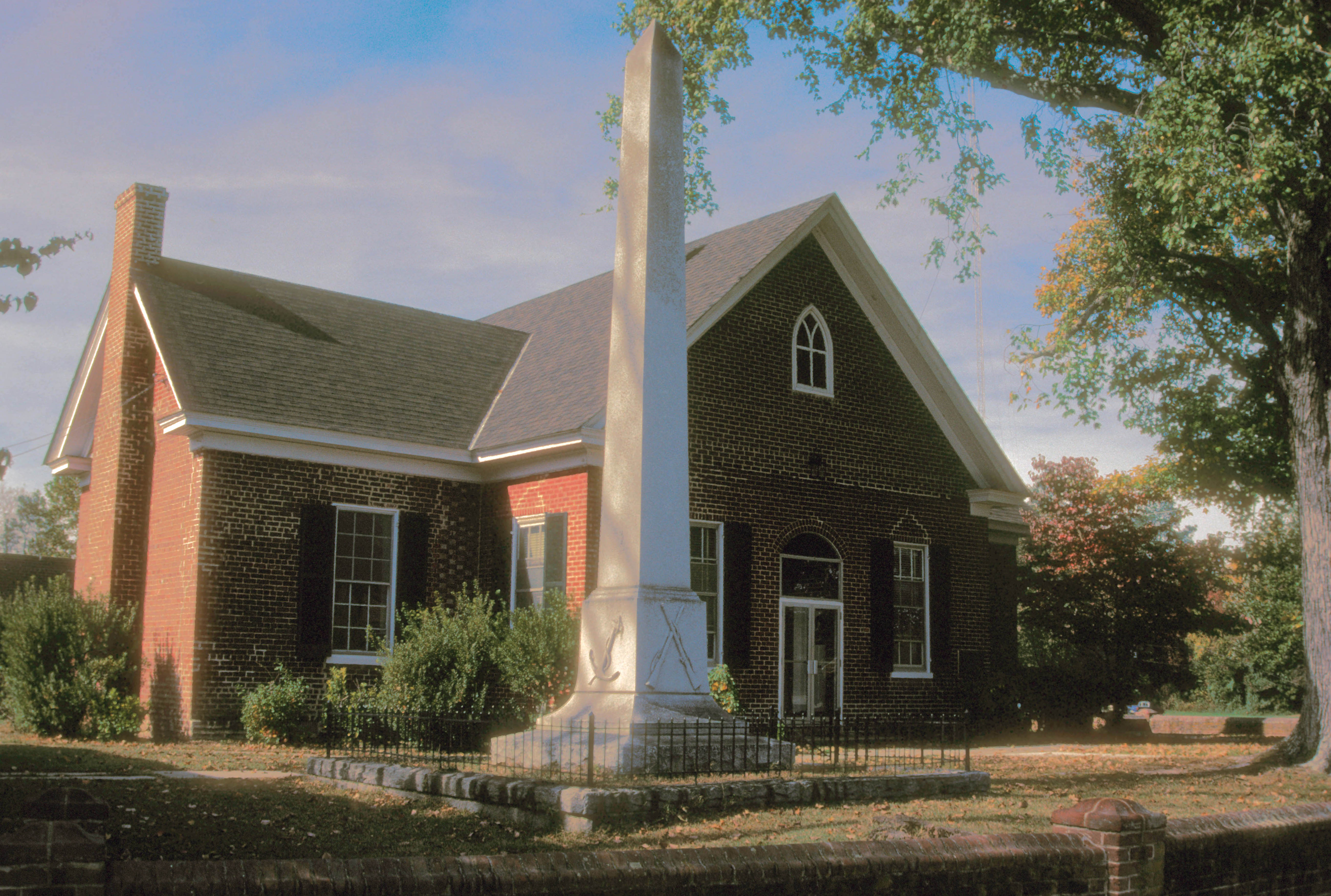
- Old King and Queen County Courthouse

- Flag Seal

- Location within the U.S. state of Virginia
- Coordinates: 37°43′N 76°54′W
- Country: United States
- State: Virginia
- Founded: 1691
- Named for: William III and Mary II
- Seat: King and Queen Court House

Area
  - Total: 326 sq mi (840 km^{2})
  - Land: 315 sq mi (820 km^{2})
  - Water: 11 sq mi (28 km^{2}) 3.4%

Population (2020)
  - Total: 6,608
  - Estimate (2025): 6,743 ▲
  - Density: 21.0/sq mi (8.10/km^{2})
- Time zone: UTC−5 (Eastern)
  - Summer (DST): UTC−4 (EDT)
- Congressional district: 1st
- Website: www.kingandqueenco.net

King and Queen County is a county in the U.S. state of Virginia, located in the state's Middle Peninsula on the eastern edge of the Greater Richmond Region. As of the 2020 census, the population was 6,608. Its county seat is King and Queen Court House.

Even in the 21st century, King and Queen County contains no incorporated towns or cities, and remains one of Virginia's most sparsely populated counties.

== History ==
King and Queen County was established in 1691 from New Kent County, and was named for King William III and Queen Mary II of England. King and Queen County is notable as one of the few counties in the United States to have recorded a larger population in the 1790 census than in 2020, this has been the case since 1920.

Among the earliest settlers of King and Queen County was Roger Shackelford, an English emigrant from Old Alresford, Hampshire, after whom the county's village of Shacklefords is named. Shackelford's descendants continued to live in the county, and by the nineteenth century had intermarried with several local families, including Taliaferro, Beverley, Thornton, and Sears.

In 1762 when he was 11, future president James Madison was sent to a boarding school run by Donald Robertson at the Innes plantation in King and Queen County. Robertson was a Scottish teacher who tutored numerous prominent plantation families in the South. From Robertson, Madison learned mathematics, geography, and modern and classical languages, becoming especially proficient in Latin. He attributed his instinct for learning "largely to that man (Robertson)." At age 16, Madison returned to his father's Montpelier estate in Orange County.

On March 2, 1864, the Battle of Walkerton, an engagement of the American Civil War, took place here, resulting in a Confederate victory.

Virginia Longest, national director of the Nursing Service for the U.S. Department of Veterans Affairs in the late 1970s, was a county native.

Richard and Mildred Loving lived in a remote part of the county in the 1960s, hoping to avoid arrest by the authorities while their legal challenge to Virginia's anti-miscegenation laws moved through the courts.

For many years, county publications noted that the county lacked any traffic lights. This is now no longer the case, as a traffic light has been installed on U.S. Route 360 and Virginia State Route 14 at St. Stephen's Church.

== Geography ==
According to the U.S. Census Bureau, the county has a total area of 326 square miles (840 km^{2}), of which 315 square miles (820 km^{2}) is land and 11 square miles (28 km^{2}) (3.4%) is water.

Measuring 63 miles (101 km) in length, it is one of the longest counties in the state of Virginia, as well as one of the narrowest, measuring less than 10 miles (16 km) across at its widest point.

=== Adjacent counties ===
- Caroline County – north
- Essex County – northeast
- Middlesex County – east
- Gloucester County – southeast
- James City County – south
- New Kent County – southwest
- King William County – west

=== Major highways ===
- US 360
- SR 14
- SR 33

== Demographics ==
Historical population
Census	Pop.	Note	%±
1790	9,377		—
1800	9,879		5.4%
1810	10,988		11.2%
1820	11,798		7.4%
1830	11,644		−1.3%
1840	10,862		−6.7%
1850	10,319		−5.0%
1860	10,328		0.1%
1870	9,709		−6.0%
1880	10,502		8.2%
1890	9,669		−7.9%
1900	9,265		−4.2%
1910	9,576		3.4%
1920	9,161		−4.3%
1930	7,618		−16.8%
1940	6,954		−8.7%
1950	6,299		−9.4%
1960	5,889		−6.5%
1970	5,491		−6.8%
1980	5,968		8.7%
1990	6,289		5.4%
2000	6,630		5.4%
2010	6,945		4.8%
2020	6,608		−4.9%
2025 (est.)	6,743	▲	2.0%
U.S. Decennial Census; 1790–1960 1900–1990; 1990–2000 2010 2020

=== Racial and ethnic composition ===
King and Queen County, Virginia – Racial and ethnic composition Note: the US Census treats Hispanic/Latino as an ethnic category. This table excludes Latinos from the racial categories and assigns them to a separate category. Hispanics/Latinos may be of any race.
Race / Ethnicity (NH = Non-Hispanic)	Pop 1980	Pop 1990	Pop 2000	Pop 2010	Pop 2020	% 1980	% 1990	% 2000	% 2010	% 2020
White alone (NH)	3,149	3,552	4,036	4,547	4,460	52.76%	56.48%	60.87%	65.47%	67.49%
Black or African American alone (NH)	2,738	2,632	2,351	1,970	1,561	45.88%	41.85%	35.46%	28.37%	23.62%
Native American or Alaska Native alone (NH)	44	65	93	109	82	0.74%	1.03%	1.40%	1.57%	1.24%
Asian alone (NH)	5	10	17	17	23	0.08%	0.16%	0.26%	0.24%	0.35%
Native Hawaiian or Pacific Islander alone (NH)	x	x	1	0	3	x	x	0.02%	0.00%	0.05%
Other race alone (NH)	3	2	6	7	19	0.05%	0.03%	0.09%	0.10%	0.29%
Mixed race or Multiracial (NH)	x	x	68	111	278	x	x	1.03%	1.60%	4.21%
Hispanic or Latino (any race)	29	28	58	184	182	0.49%	0.45%	0.87%	2.65%	2.75%
Total	5,968	6,289	6,630	6,945	6,608	100.00%	100.00%	100.00%	100.00%	100.00%

=== 2020 census ===
As of the 2020 census, the county had a population of 6,608. The median age was 50.1 years. 17.4% of residents were under the age of 18 and 24.6% of residents were 65 years of age or older. For every 100 females there were 96.9 males, and for every 100 females age 18 and over there were 95.9 males age 18 and over.

The racial makeup of the county was 67.9% White, 23.8% Black or African American, 1.4% American Indian and Alaska Native, 0.3% Asian, 0.0% Native Hawaiian and Pacific Islander, 1.4% from some other race, and 5.1% from two or more races. Hispanic or Latino residents of any race comprised 2.8% of the population.

0.0% of residents lived in urban areas, while 100.0% lived in rural areas.

There were 2,884 households in the county, of which 25.0% had children under the age of 18 living with them and 26.1% had a female householder with no spouse or partner present. About 28.8% of all households were made up of individuals and 15.7% had someone living alone who was 65 years of age or older.

There were 3,454 housing units, of which 16.5% were vacant. Among occupied housing units, 79.6% were owner-occupied and 20.4% were renter-occupied. The homeowner vacancy rate was 2.3% and the rental vacancy rate was 9.8%.

=== 2000 Census ===
As of the census of 2000, there were 6,630 people residing in the county; these included 2,673 households and 1,897 families. The population density was 21 people per square mile (8.1 people/km^{2}). There were 3,010 housing units, at an average density of 10 units per square mile (3.9 units/km^{2}). The racial makeup of the county was 61.22% White, 35.67% Black or African American, 1.42% Native American, 0.27% Asian, 0.02% Pacific Islander, 0.15% from other races, and 1.25% from two or more races. 0.87% of the population were Hispanic or Latino of any race.

Of the 2,673 households, 26.80% had children under the age of 18 living with them, 52.60% were married couples living together, 13.50% had a female householder with no husband present, and 29.00% were non-families. 24.60% of all households were made up of individuals, and 11.00% had someone living alone who was 65 years of age or older. The average household size was 2.48 and the average family size was 2.94.

The median age in the county was 41 years, with 22.70% under the age of 18, 7.00% from 18 to 24, 26.80% from 25 to 44, 27.00% from 45 to 64, and 16.40% who were 65 years of age or older. For every 100 females, there were 95.20 males. For every 100 females age 18 and over, there were 92.50 males.

The median household income was $35,941, and the median family income was $40,563. Males had a median income of $33,217, versus $21,753 for females. The per capita income for the county was $17,236. 10.90% of the population and 7.80% of families were below the poverty line. Of the total people living in poverty, 8.10% were under the age of 18 and 14.80% were 65 or older.

== Government ==
=== Board of Supervisors ===
- Buena Vista District: Carolyn R. Billups (I)
- Newtown District: Sherrin C. Alsop (I)
- Shanghai District: Marie H. Norman (I)
- St. Stephens Church District: James Lawrence Simpkins (I)
- Stevensville District: Mark R. Berry (I)

=== Constitutional officers ===
- Clerk of the Circuit Court: Hattie M. Robinson (I)
- Commissioner of the Revenue: Kelly N. Lumpkin (I)
- Commonwealth's Attorney: Meredith D. Adkins (I)
- Sheriff: William Balderson (I)
- Treasurer: Stephanie Sears (I)

King and Queen County is represented by Republican Richard H. Stuart and Ryan T. McDougle in the Virginia Senate, Republican M. Keith Hodges in the Virginia House of Delegates, and Republican Robert J. "Rob" Wittman in the U.S. House of Representatives.

Presidentially, King and Queen County is a bellwether county of sorts. It correctly predicted the winner of all but four presidential elections between 1928 and 2024, voting for losing candidates only in 1968, 1980, 2012, and 2020.

United States presidential election results for King and Queen County, Virginia
Year	Republican		Democratic		Third party(ies)	
Year	No.	%	No.	%	No.	%
1912	68	18.78%	246	67.96%	48	13.26%
1916	127	31.91%	271	68.09%	0	0.00%
1920	181	34.28%	347	65.72%	0	0.00%
1924	134	29.65%	314	69.47%	4	0.88%
1928	319	53.26%	280	46.74%	0	0.00%
1932	154	28.79%	368	68.79%	13	2.43%
1936	124	24.95%	372	74.85%	1	0.20%
1940	124	25.31%	365	74.49%	1	0.20%
1944	166	31.38%	363	68.62%	0	0.00%
1948	171	31.26%	293	53.56%	83	15.17%
1952	415	51.23%	387	47.78%	8	0.99%
1956	495	54.64%	289	31.90%	122	13.47%
1960	432	43.95%	536	54.53%	15	1.53%
1964	699	46.94%	786	52.79%	4	0.27%
1968	568	27.40%	882	42.55%	623	30.05%
1972	1,033	58.30%	708	39.95%	31	1.75%
1976	778	39.06%	1,111	55.77%	103	5.17%
1980	949	44.14%	1,128	52.47%	73	3.40%
1984	1,449	54.39%	1,201	45.08%	14	0.53%
1988	1,376	50.46%	1,309	48.00%	42	1.54%
1992	1,206	41.34%	1,363	46.73%	348	11.93%
1996	1,073	38.93%	1,393	50.54%	290	10.52%
2000	1,423	49.77%	1,387	48.51%	49	1.71%
2004	1,737	52.86%	1,506	45.83%	43	1.31%
2008	1,763	47.58%	1,918	51.77%	24	0.65%
2012	1,865	51.03%	1,745	47.74%	45	1.23%
2016	2,099	56.78%	1,468	39.71%	130	3.52%
2020	2,450	59.54%	1,590	38.64%	75	1.82%
2024	2,608	62.27%	1,536	36.68%	44	1.05%

== Communities ==
Census-designated Place

- King and Queen Court House

Unincorporated Communities

- Newtown
- St. Stephen's Church
- Shacklefords

== Education ==
The sole school district is King and Queen County Public Schools.

== See also ==
- National Register of Historic Places listings in King and Queen County, Virginia
