= National Register of Historic Places listings in Essex County, Virginia =

Location of Essex County in Virginia

This is a list of the National Register of Historic Places listings in Essex County, Virginia.

This is intended to be a complete list of the properties and districts on the National Register of Historic Places in Essex County, Virginia, United States. The locations of National Register properties and districts for which the latitude and longitude coordinates are included below, may be seen in an online map.

There are 19 properties and districts listed on the National Register in the county.

This National Park Service list is complete through NPS recent listings posted March 6, 2026.

== Current listings ==
| | Name on the Register | Image | Date listed | Location | City or town | Description |
|---|---|---|---|---|---|---|
| 1 | Blandfield | Blandfield | November 12, 1969 (#69000238) | North of the junction of U.S. Route 17 and Essex Church Rd. 38°00′02″N 76°57′00″W | Caret | |
| 2 | Brooke's Bank | Brooke's Bank | September 28, 1971 (#71000976) | 1 mile (1.6 km) east of Loretto and 1.4 miles (2.3 km) north of U.S. Route 17; 38°05′24″N 77°01′06″W | Loretto | |
| 3 | Cherry Walk | Cherry Walk | February 10, 1983 (#83003280) | South of Dunbrooke on Dunbrooke Rd. 37°51′41″N 76°56′59″W | Dunbrooke | |
| 4 | DAW Theatre | | October 15, 2024 (#100010926) | 152 Prince Street; 37°55′44″N 76°51′29″W | Tappahannock | |
| 5 | Edenetta | Edenetta | November 22, 2016 (#16000796) | 6514 U.S. Route 17; 38°03′47″N 77°01′23″W | Chance | |
| 6 | Elmwood | Elmwood | September 15, 1970 (#70000790) | West of the junction of U.S. Route 17 and Clarke's Store Rd. 38°05′07″N 77°05′39″W | Loretto | |
| 7 | Glebe House of St. Anne's Parish | Glebe House of St. Anne's Parish | March 3, 1975 (#75002020) | 2.5 miles (4.0 km) northeast of Champlain on the northern bank of Farmers Hall Creek; 38°01′57″N 76°57′13″W | Champlain | |
| 8 | Glencairn | Glencairn | May 14, 1979 (#79003036) | North of Chance off U.S. Route 17; 38°03′54″N 77°00′42″W | Chance | |
| 9 | Hundley Hall and Hoskins Country Store | | November 27, 2024 (#100011137) | 381-383 Dunnsville Road; 37°51′30″N 76°49′15″W | Dunnsville | |
| 10 | Linden | Linden | October 15, 1992 (#92001397) | Southwestern side of U.S. Route 17, 0.5 miles (0.80 km) south of Champlain; 38°00′18″N 76°59′14″W | Champlain | |
| 11 | Millers Tavern Rural Historic District | Millers Tavern Rural Historic District | June 5, 2017 (#100001040) | Roughly bounded by U.S. Route 360 and Howerton, Dunbrooke, Latanes Mill, and Midway Rds. 37°49′44″N 76°58′04″W | Millers Tavern | Extends into King and Queen County |
| 12 | Monte Verde | Monte Verde | May 30, 2002 (#02000586) | 405 Monte Verde Rd. 37°48′46″N 76°45′45″W | Center Cross | |
| 13 | Occupacia-Rappahannock Rural Historic District | | November 30, 2020 (#100005837) | Roughly bounded by the Essex County line, Supply, Clarkes Store, and Pilkington Rds., the Rappahannock R., Blandfield (028-5084-0510), and Tidewater Trail (US 17) through center. 38°06′16″N 77°06′05″W | Tappahannock vicinity | |
| 14 | Port Micou | Port Micou | February 6, 1992 (#91002041) | Marlbank Rd. at the Rappahannock River; 38°07′22″N 77°03′20″W | Loretto | |
| 15 | St. Matthew's Church | St. Matthew's Church | January 16, 2004 (#03001429) | Junction of U.S. Route 17 with Daingerfield Landing and St. Matthews Church Rds. 38°00′57″N 76°59′32″W | Champlain | |
| 16 | Tappahannock Historic District | Tappahannock Historic District | April 2, 1973 (#73002009) | Roughly bounded by Queen St., Church Lane, the Rappahannock River, and the grounds of St. Margaret's School; 37°55′39″N 76°51′31″W | Tappahannock | |
| 17 | Vauter's Church | Vauter's Church | December 5, 1972 (#72001391) | 1 mile (1.6 km) northwest of Loretto on U.S. Route 17; 38°05′13″N 77°04′07″W | Loretto | |
| 18 | Wheatland | Wheatland | December 19, 1990 (#89001918) | Wheatland Rd. between U.S. Route 17 and the Rappahannock River; 38°05′24″N 77°02′06″W | Loretto | |
| 19 | Woodlawn | Woodlawn | July 16, 1980 (#80004187) | Northeast of Miller's Tavern; 37°51′08″N 76°55′10″W | Miller's Tavern | |

== See also ==
- List of National Historic Landmarks in Virginia
- National Register of Historic Places listings in Virginia
