= Millers Tavern Rural Historic District =

Historic district in Virginia, United States

- U.S. National Register of Historic Places
- U.S. Historic district
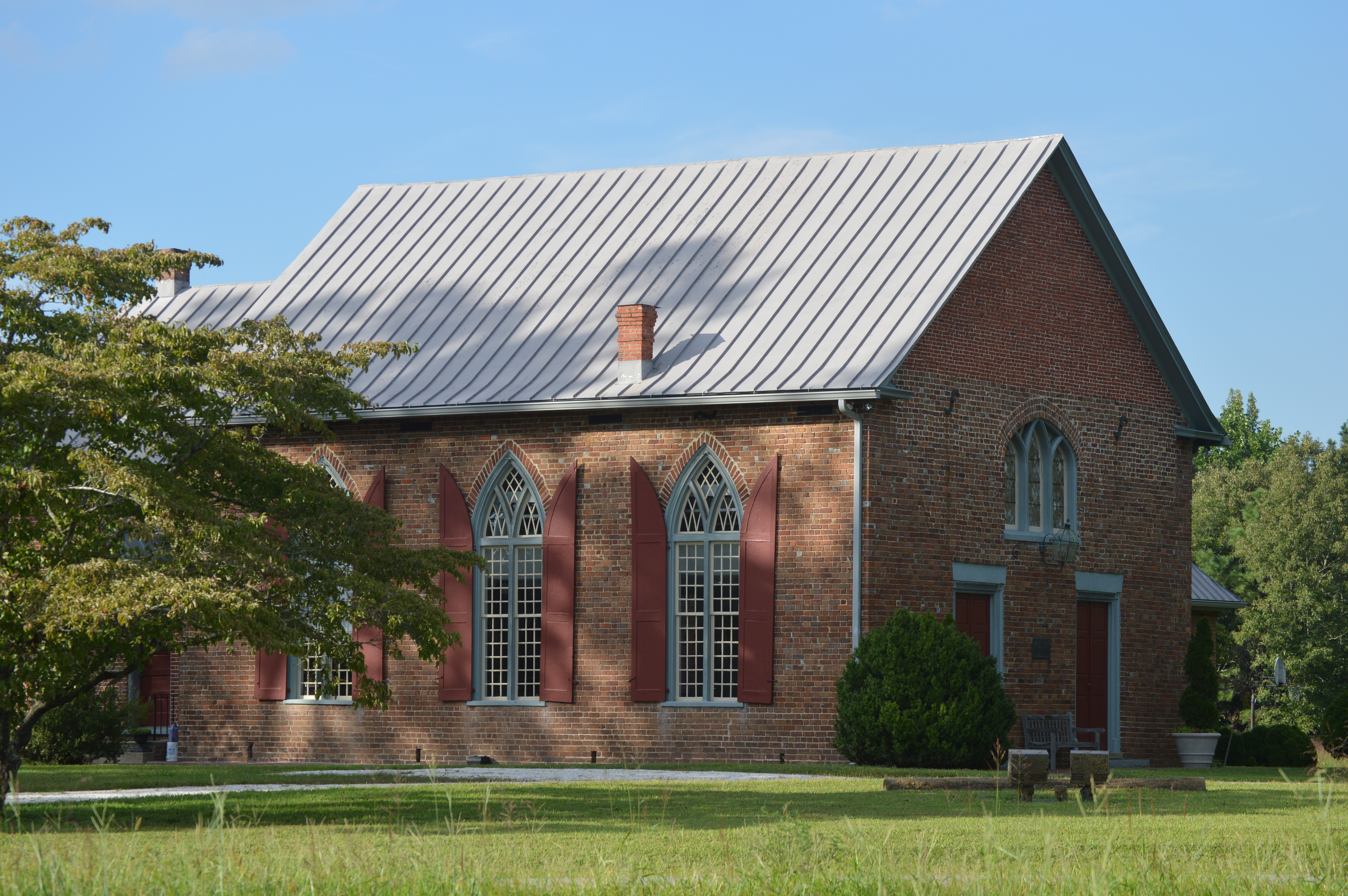
- St. Paul's Episcopal Church on the Essex County side

- Location within Virginia Location within the United States
- Location: Roughly bounded by U.S. Route 360 and Howerton, Dunbrooke, Latanes Mill, and Midway Rds., Miller's Tavern, Essex County and King and Queen County, Virginia
- Coordinates: 37°49′44″N 76°58′4″W
- Area: 3,900 acres (1,600 ha)
- NRHP reference No.: 100001040
- Added to NRHP: June 5, 2017

The Millers Tavern Rural Historic District encompasses a large rural landscape in western Essex County, Virginia, United States, extending partly into eastern King and Queen County. Its 3,900 acres (1,600 ha) landscape has seen only modest alterations since the 17th century, with predominantly agricultural uses persisting. Most of the farm properties in the district are modest, with vernacular building stock dating from the late 18th century to the mid-20th century. Sprinkled throughout the district are a few churches and grist mills, as well as the eponymous Miller's Tavern. The district is roughly bounded by U.S. Route 360 and Howerton, Dunbrooke, Latanes Mill, and Midway Rds.

The district was listed on the National Register of Historic Places in 2017.

== See also ==
- National Register of Historic Places listings in Essex County, Virginia
- National Register of Historic Places listings in King and Queen County, Virginia
