= U.S. Route 360 =

Highway or spur in Virginia

U.S. Route 360
- US 360 highlighted in red

Route information
- Auxiliary route of US 60
- Maintained by VDOT
- Length: 225.31 mi (362.60 km)
- Existed: 1933–present
- Tourist routes: Virginia Byway

Major junctions
- West end: US 58 Bus. / SR 293 / SR 360 in Danville
- US 29 / US 58 / SR 785 in Danville; US 501 near South Boston; US 15 near Keysville; US 460 in Burkeville; US 1 / US 301 in Richmond; US 60 in Richmond; US 250 in Richmond; I-64 / I-95 in Richmond; I-295 in Mechanicsville; US 17 in Tappahannock
- East end: SR 644 in Reedville

Location
- Country: United States
- State: Virginia
- Counties: City of Danville, Pittsylvania, Halifax, Charlotte, Prince Edward, Nottoway, Amelia, Chesterfield, City of Richmond, Henrico, Hanover, King William, King and Queen, Essex, Richmond, Northumberland

Highway system
- United States Numbered Highway System; List; Special; Divided; Virginia Routes; Interstate; US; Primary; Secondary; Byways; History; HOT lanes
← SR 359	→ SR 360

U.S. Route 360 (US 360) is a spur route of US 60. The U.S. Highway runs 225.3 miles (362.6 km), entirely within the state of Virginia, from US 58 Business, Virginia State Route 293 (SR 293), and SR 360 in Danville east to SR 644 in Reedville. US 360 connects Danville, South Boston, Keysville and Burkeville in Southside Virginia with the state capital of Richmond. The highway connects Richmond with Tappahannock on the Middle Peninsula and the eastern Northern Neck, where it serves as the primary route through Northumberland County. US 360 is a four-lane divided highway for almost all of its length.

== Route description ==
=== Danville to Keysville ===
US 360 begins at a four-way intersection on the north side of the Dan River, across from downtown Danville. Main Street heads south across the river into downtown Danville as SR 293, and north as SR 293 and SR 360 (SR 360 is a two-lane highway, the old alignment of US 360 from Danville to northeast of South Boston). The west leg of the intersection is Riverside Drive, which is followed by US 58 Business. US 360 heads east along four-lane divided River Street with US 58 Business, and passes under Norfolk Southern Railway's Danville District rail line. The highway's name changes to South Boston Highway on crossing Fall Creek and veering away from the Dan River. US 360 reaches the eastern end of its concurrency with US 58 Business and joins with US 58 at the highway's cloverleaf interchange with US 29 (Danville Expressway). US 360 and US 58 leave the city of Danville after passing along the north side of Danville Regional Airport.

US 360 and US 58 meet at the northern end of SR 62 (Milton Highway) in eastern Pittsylvania County before entering Halifax County. The highway's name changes to Philpott Road and it crosses the Dan River. US 360 and US 58 pass through the hamlets of Delila (where the U.S. highways meet the northern end of SR 119 (Calvary Road)) and Turbeville before reaching the crossroads community of Riverdale on the south side of the Dan River opposite downtown South Boston. The U.S. Highways have a grade crossing at Norfolk Southern's Durham District rail line and then intersect US 501 (Huell Matthews Highway), where the highways begin to follow Bill Tuck Highway. A short distance east of US 501, US 360 and US 58 diverge, with US 360 turning north onto the James D. Hagood Highway. The highway crosses the Dan River, its floodplain, and Norfolk Southern's Danville–Richmond rail line via a 2,000-foot-long bridge. On entering the town limits of South Boston, the highway follows John Randolph Boulevard and has intersections with the eastern ends of SR 304 (Seymour Drive) and SR 34 (Hodges Street).

After leaving South Boston, US 360 becomes James D. Hagood Highway again, and heads northeast past South Boston Speedway and William M. Tuck Airport. The U.S. Highway crosses the Banister River at Terrys Bridge and meets the coincident termini of SR 360 (Bethel Road) and SR 344 (Scottsburg Road) near Scottsburg. US 360 crosses over the Danville–Richmond rail line and meets the western end of SR 92 (Clover Road) south of the town of Clover. It crosses the Roanoke River into Charlotte County and follows Kings Highway, which intersects SR 92 (Jeb Stuart Highway) again and US 15 (Barnesville Highway) at Wylliesburg. US 360 and US 15 run concurrently north through Crafton Gate, where the highways intersect SR 47 (Craftons Gate Highway). South of Keysville, at the southern end of US 15 Business and US 360 Business (Old Kings Highway), the highway becomes a freeway that bypasses Keysville. US 15 and US 360 cross over the Virginia Southern Railroad and have a partial interchange with the business routes. Just east of the town of Keysville, the U.S. Highways have a diamond interchange with SR 40 (Lunenburg County Highway). US 15 and US 360 pass under the Virginia Southern rail line before diverging at a partial-cloverleaf interchange that also marks the northern end of their respective business routes and the end of the freeway section of US 360.

=== Keysville to Richmond ===
US 360 briefly runs atop the Prince Edward – Lunenburg county line before fully entering Prince Edward County, where the highway parallels the Virginia Southern Railroad to the south and Norfolk Southern Railway's Blue Ridge District to the north. It passes around the community of Bruceville and through the town of Meherrin, where the highway crosses to the north side of the Blue Ridge rail line. As US 360 passes through Meherrin, the highway briefly enters into Lunenburg County before reentering Prince Edward County, although no signs mark the county line there. US 360 begins to parallel the two rail lines at Green Bay, where the road temporarily becomes undivided. It parallels both rail lines to Burkeville, in the southwestern corner of Nottoway County, where the road's name changes to Patrick Henry Highway. US 360 crosses over the Farmville Belt Line, a part of the Blue Ridge District that serves Farmville and joins the main Blue Ridge line in Burkeville. Just north of the rail crossing, the highway has a partial-cloverleaf interchange with US 460 (Colonial Trail Highway) and US 360 Business and US 460 Business, which parallel the rail line into town as Nunnally Street (formerly named 2nd Street). US 360 and US 460 bypass the town to the north and receive the eastern end of their respective business routes before diverging at a partial interchange. There is no direct access from westbound US 360 to eastbound US 460 or from westbound US 460 to eastbound US 360; those movements are made via SR 723 (Lewiston Plank Road) or SR 49 (Watsons Wood Rd).

US 360 parallels Norfolk Southern's Richmond District rail line northeast from Burkeville. The highway meets the northern end of SR 49 (Watsons Wood Road) before entering Amelia County. West of Jetersville, the highway intersects the eastern end of SR 307 (Holly Farms Road), which connects to US 460 northwest of Burkeville. US 360 continues to Amelia Court House, which is directly served by US 360 Business (Goodes Bridge Road). North of the county seat, the highway crosses the rail line and has a partial-cloverleaf interchange with its business route before receiving the northern end of the business route west of Winterham, where the highway and railroad diverge. US 360 has a junction with SR 153 (Military Road) between Winterham and the Appomattox River, where the highway enters Chesterfield County. US 360 becomes Hull Street Road and passes through the village of Skinquarter before entering the suburban area surrounding Richmond. The U.S. Highway expands to eight lanes through Woodlake and crosses Swift Creek just downstream from the dam that holds back Swift Creek Reservoir west of the highway's cloverleaf interchange with SR 288.

US 360 continues northeast as a six-lane highway through additional suburban areas before its partial-cloverleaf interchange with SR 150 (Chippenham Parkway), where the it enters the city of Richmond and reduces to four lanes. The U.S. Highway crosses CSX's North End Subdivision and becomes Hull Street at its intersection with SR 161 (Belt Boulevard). US 360 heads into the Manchester section of Richmond as a four-lane undivided highway that has intersections with SR 10 (Broad Rock Road), Midlothian Turnpike, and US 1 and US 301, which head south toward Petersburg as Jefferson Davis Highway and north toward their James River crossing as Cowardin Street. US 360 passes the Art Works artist colony before passing over Norfolk Southern and the James River on the Mayo Bridge, which crosses Mayo Island in the middle of the river. US 360 reaches the north side of the river just west of the Triple Crossing; it passes under the east–west viaduct of CSX's Rivanna Subdivision and has a grade crossing of Norfolk Southern's Richmond District. US 360 passes under SR 195 (Downtown Expressway) and follows 14th Street into the Shockoe Bottom neighborhood, where US 360 turns east onto Main Street, which carries US 60 and the GRTC Pulse rapid-transit bus line. The two highways pass under I-95 (Richmond–Petersburg Turnpike) and CSX's Bellwood Subdivision and by the Main Street Station serving Amtrak's Northeast Regional trains during their four-block concurrency.

=== Richmond to Reedville ===
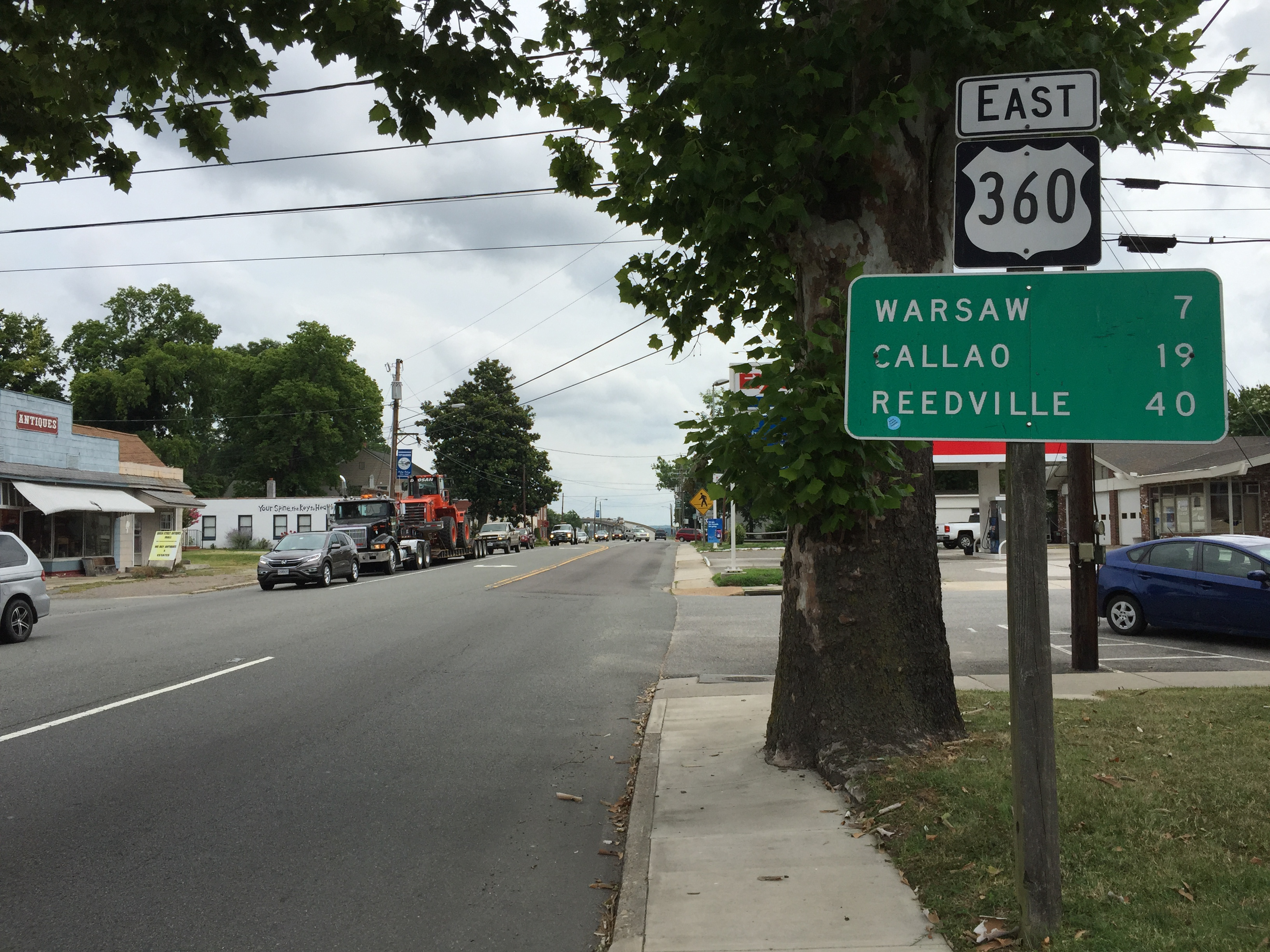
View east along US 360 in Tappahannock

US 360 turns northeast onto 18th Street at Mason's Hall to pass along the west edge of the Church Hill neighborhood. At Grace Street, the highway splits into a one-way pair; westbound US 360 follows 17th Street. US 360 meets the eastern end of US 250 (Broad Street), then curves north and passes under the Leigh Street Viaduct, which carries SR 33. The two directions of US 360 come together one block before the highway turns east onto Fairfield Way. US 360 turns north onto four-lane undivided Mechanicsville Turnpike and has a partial-cloverleaf interchange with I-64 before exiting the city of Richmond as a six-lane divided highway. US 360 passes through the Henrico County community of East Highland Park, where it intersects Laburnum Avenue, which leads to Richmond Raceway. The highway crosses the Chickahominy River into Hanover County, where it reduces to four lanes at the southern end of Mechanicsville's US 360 Business. While on the Mechanicsville Bypass, US 360 has a diamond interchange with SR 156 (Cold Harbor Road). The movement from westbound US 360 to SR 156 is provided at the northern end of the bypass, which occurs a short distance south of US 360's cloverleaf interchange with I‑295.

Northeast of I-295, US 360 gradually transitions from suburban to rural surroundings. The transition is complete by the time it crosses the Pamunkey River into King William County, where the highway's name changes to Richmond–Tappahannock Highway. US 360 passes through Manquin and Central Garage, where it intersects SR 30 (King William Road). At Aylett, the site of Zoar State Forest, US 360 crosses the Mattaponi River into King and Queen County, where it meets the western end of SR 14 at the community of St. Stephens Church. US 360 enters Essex County at Miller's Tavern, where the highway crosses the watershed divide between the York River tributaries and the Rappahannock River. US 360 is named Richmond Highway northeast past Tappahannock-Essex County Airport to Brays Fork, where the highway meets US 17 (Tidewater Trail) at a directional intersection. The U.S. highways run concurrently into the town of Tappahannock. Within the town, US 17 and US 360 cross Hoskins Creek and become a four-lane undivided highway. On the north side of the downtown area, US 360 turns east onto two-lane Queen Street and crosses the Rappahannock River on a high-level two-lane bridge.

US 360 expands to a four-lane divided highway on arriving in Richmond County. It heads east as Richmond Road past the historic plantation Mount Airy to the town of Warsaw. In the center of town, through which US 360 is an undivided highway, the highway runs concurrently with SR 3 Business from Main Street to SR 3 (Historyland Highway). US 360 expands to a divided highway at the hamlet of Indian Field and passes through Haynesville before entering Northumberland County at Village. The highway veers northeast at Luttrellville and meets the eastern end of SR 202 (Hampton Hall Road) in Callao. At SR 202, US 360 turns east onto Northumberland Highway, which is two lanes within the unincorporated village. US 360 briefly expands to a four-lane divided highway but is two lanes through Lottsburg. US 360 has another divided-highway section before reducing to two lanes through Heathsville, where it passes St. Stephen's Episcopal Church and intersects SR 201 (Courthouse Road). The highway passes through Claraville, Horse Head, and Downings Corner before reaching its junction with SR 200 (Jesse DuPont Memorial Highway) at Burgess. US 360 has its final four-lane divided section between Folly and Lilian. At Beverlyville, it curves south toward Reedville. At SR 657 (Fleeton Road), US 360 follows Main Street south to its eastern terminus at the intersection of Main Street and Reed Avenue, which are both part of SR 644.

== Major intersections ==
County	Location	mi	km	Destinations	Notes
City of Danville		0.00	0.00	US 58 Bus. west (Riverside Drive) / SR 293 / SR 360 east (Main Street)	Western terminus; west end of concurrency with US 58 Business
City of Danville		1.88	3.03	US 29 / US 58 west (Danville Expressway) – Lynchburg, Greensboro, Martinsville, Dan Daniel Memorial Park, Chapel Hill	interchange; east end of concurrency with US 58 Business; west end of concurrency with US 58; future northern terminus of I-785
Pittsylvania		7.13	11.47	SR 62 south (Milton Highway) / SR 726 north (Ringgold Depot Road) – Milton, NC	
Halifax	Delila	13.93	22.42	SR 119 south (Calvary Road) / SR 694 north (Medley Road)	
Halifax	South Boston (Riverdale)	29.76	47.89	US 501 (Huell Matthews Highway) – South Boston, Roxboro, NC	west end of US 501 Truck overlap
Halifax		30.46	49.02	US 58 east (Bill Tuck Highway) – Clarksville, South Hill	East end of concurrency with US 58
Halifax	South Boston	31.07	50.00	SR 304 west (Seymour Drive) – South Boston Business District	
Halifax	South Boston	31.59	50.84	SR 34 west (Hodges Street) – South Boston Business District	
Halifax	South Boston			US 501 Truck north (Hamilton Boulevard)	north end of US 501 Truck overlap
Halifax		38.83	62.49	SR 344 east (Scottsburg Road) / SR 360 west (Bethel Road) – Halifax, Scottsburg, Staunton River State Park	
Halifax		44.02	70.84	SR 92 east (Clover Road) / SR 720 south (Guill Town Road) – Clover, Staunton River Battlefield State Park	
Charlotte		48.48	78.02	SR 92 (J.E.B. Stuart Highway) – Chase City, Clarksville, Barnes Junction	
Charlotte		53.12	85.49	US 15 south (Barnesville Highway) / SR 611 west (Hebron Church Road) – Wylliesburg, Clarksville	West end of concurrency with US 15
Charlotte	Crafton Gate	57.00	91.73	SR 47 (Craftons Gate Highway) – Drakes Branch, Chase City	
Charlotte	Ontario	63.60	102.35	US 15 Bus. north / US 360 Bus. east (Old Kings Highway) / SR 622 west (Old Kings Road) – Keysville	
Charlotte				US 15 Bus. / US 360 Bus. – Keysville	Interchange; no westbound entrance
Charlotte		66.96	107.76	SR 40 – Keysville, Victoria	interchange
Charlotte		69.00	111.04	US 15 north / US 15 Bus. south / US 360 Bus. west – Farmville, Keysville	interchange; north end of concurrency with US 15
Lunenburg	Meherrin			no major junctions	
Prince Edward	Green Bay			SR 696 (Green Bay Road) – Farmville	former SR 135 north
Nottoway		86.53	139.26	US 460 west / US 360 Bus. east / US 460 Bus. east – Farmville, Lynchburg, Roanoke, Burkeville	interchange; west end of US 460 overlap; no access from US 360 west to US 360 Bus. east / US 460 Bus. east or US 460 east to US 360 west
Nottoway	Burkeville	87.78	141.27	US 360 Bus. west / US 460 Bus. west (2nd Street) – Burkeville	
Nottoway		88.21	141.96	US 460 east – Petersburg	Interchange; east end of US 460 overlap; eastbound exit and westbound entrance
Nottoway				SR 723 (Lewiston Plank Road) to US 460 east – Victoria	
Nottoway				SR 323 – Piedmont Geriatric Hospital	
Nottoway		90.90	146.29	SR 49 south (Watsons Wood Road) – Crewe, Victoria	
Amelia		95.56	153.79	SR 307 west (Holly Farms Road) to US 460 west – Farmville, Lynchburg, Sailor's Creek Battlefield State Park	
Amelia		104.03	167.42	US 360 Bus. east (Goodes Bridge Road) – Amelia	
Amelia				SR 681 (Pridesville Road) – Tobaccoville	former SR 38 west
Amelia				US 360 Bus. – Amelia	interchange
Amelia		106.75	171.80	US 360 Bus. west (Goodes Bridge Road)	
Amelia	Chula Junction			SR 604 (Chula Road) to US 60 – Chula, Amelia Wildlife Management Area	former SR 148 north
Amelia				SR 153 south (Military Road) – Blackstone, Fort Barfoot	former SR 148 south
Chesterfield				SR 621 (Winterpock Road) to SR 602 – Winterpock	former SR 153 south
Chesterfield		126.86	204.16	SR 288 to I-95 / SR 76 north (Powhite Parkway) – Chesterfield	interchange
Chesterfield		134.52	216.49	SR 150 (Chippenham Parkway) to I-95 / Powhite Parkway	interchange
City of Richmond		137.31	220.98	SR 161 (Belt Boulevard)	
City of Richmond				SR 10 east (Broad Rock Road)	
City of Richmond				US 60 Truck west (Midlothian Turnpike)	west end of US 60 Truck overlap
City of Richmond		139.08	223.83	US 1 / US 301 (Cowardin Avenue / Jefferson Davis Highway)	no left turn from either direction
City of Richmond				East Commerce Road	former SR 416; no left turn eastbound
City of Richmond				Mayo Bridge over James River	
City of Richmond		140.67	226.39	US 60 west (East Main Street)	east end of US 60 Truck overlap; west end of US 60 overlap
City of Richmond		140.97	226.87	US 60 east (East Main Street)	East end of concurrency with US 60
City of Richmond		141.17	227.19	East Broad Street (US 250 west)	
City of Richmond		143.06	230.23	I-64 to I-95	I-64 exit 192
Henrico	No major junctions				
Hanover	Mechanicsville	146.65	236.01	US 360 Bus. east (Elm Drive)	
Hanover	Mechanicsville	147.25	236.98	SR 156 – Cold Harbor, Seven Pines	interchange; no westbound exit
Hanover	Mechanicsville	147.38	237.19	US 360 Bus. west to SR 156 south – Mechanicsville, Cold Harbor, Seven Pines, Richmond National Battlefield Park, Beaver Dam Creek	Westbound exit only
Hanover	Mechanicsville	147.98	238.15	I-295 to I-64 / I-95 north – Charlottesville, Washington, Norfolk, Rocky Mount, NC	I-295 exit 37
King William	Central Garage	164.24	264.32	SR 30 (King William Road) – Bowling Green, West Point, King William CH, Mattaponi Indian Reservation, Pamunkey Indian Reservation	
King and Queen	St. Stephens Church	170.49	274.38	SR 14 east (The Trail) / SR 721 north (Newtown Road) – Bowling Green, King & Queen CH, Newtown	
Essex	Millers Tavern			SR 620 / SR 684 (Dunbrooke Road / Howerton Road) to US 17 – Center Cross, Bowlers Wharf, Dunbrooke	
Essex	Brays Fork	183.64	295.54	US 17 south (Tidewater Trail) – Saluda, Portsmouth	West end of concurrency with US 17
Essex	Tappahannock	186.08	299.47	US 17 north (Church Lane) / SR 1014 (Queen Street) – Fredericksburg	East end of concurrency with US 17
Rappahannock River				Downing Bridge	
Richmond				SR 624 (Newland Road) – Naylors, Newland, Foneswood	former SR 204 north
Richmond	Warsaw	192.73	310.17	SR 3 Bus. west (Main Street) / SR 1004 (Court Circle) – Fredericksburg, George Washington Birthplace National Monument, Westmoreland State Park, Stratford Hall Lee Birthplace	West end of concurrency with SR 3 Business
Richmond	Warsaw	193.51	311.42	SR 3 (Historyland Highway) – Fredericksburg, Kilmarnock	East end of concurrency with SR 3 Business
Northumberland	Callao	204.63	329.32	SR 202 west (Hampton Hall Road) – Montross	
Northumberland	Heathsville	211.76	340.79	SR 201 south (Courthouse Road) – Lively	
Northumberland	Burgess	219.67	353.52	SR 200 south (Jesse Dupont Memorial Highway) – Kilmarnock	
Northumberland	Reedville	225.31	362.60	SR 644 (Reed Avenue / Main Street)	Eastern terminus
1.000 mi = 1.609 km; 1.000 km = 0.621 mi: Concurrency terminus; Incomplete access

== Special routes ==
=== Keysville business route ===
U.S. Route 360 Business
- Location: Keysville
- Length: 5.93 mi (9.54 km)

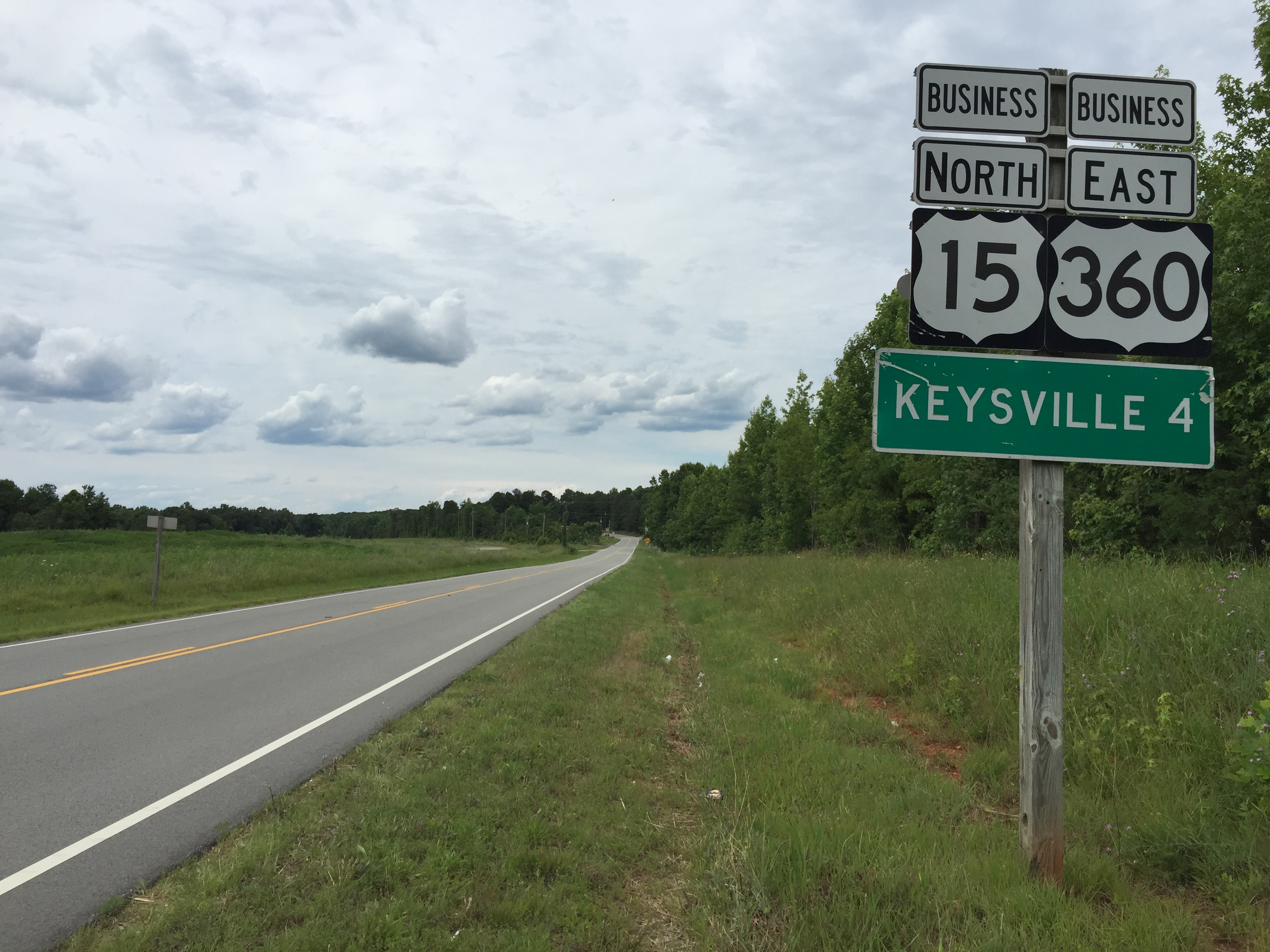
View north along US 15 Bus. and east along US 360 Bus. northeast of SR 622 just south of Keysville

U.S. Route 360 Business in Charlotte County is the westernmost of several business routes of US 360. The highway, which runs 5.93 miles (9.54 km) between junctions with US 360 and US 15 south and north of Keysville, is entirely concurrent with US 15 Business.

=== Burkeville business route ===
U.S. Route 360 Business
- Location: Burkeville
- Length: 1.13 mi (1.82 km)
- Existed: 1968–present

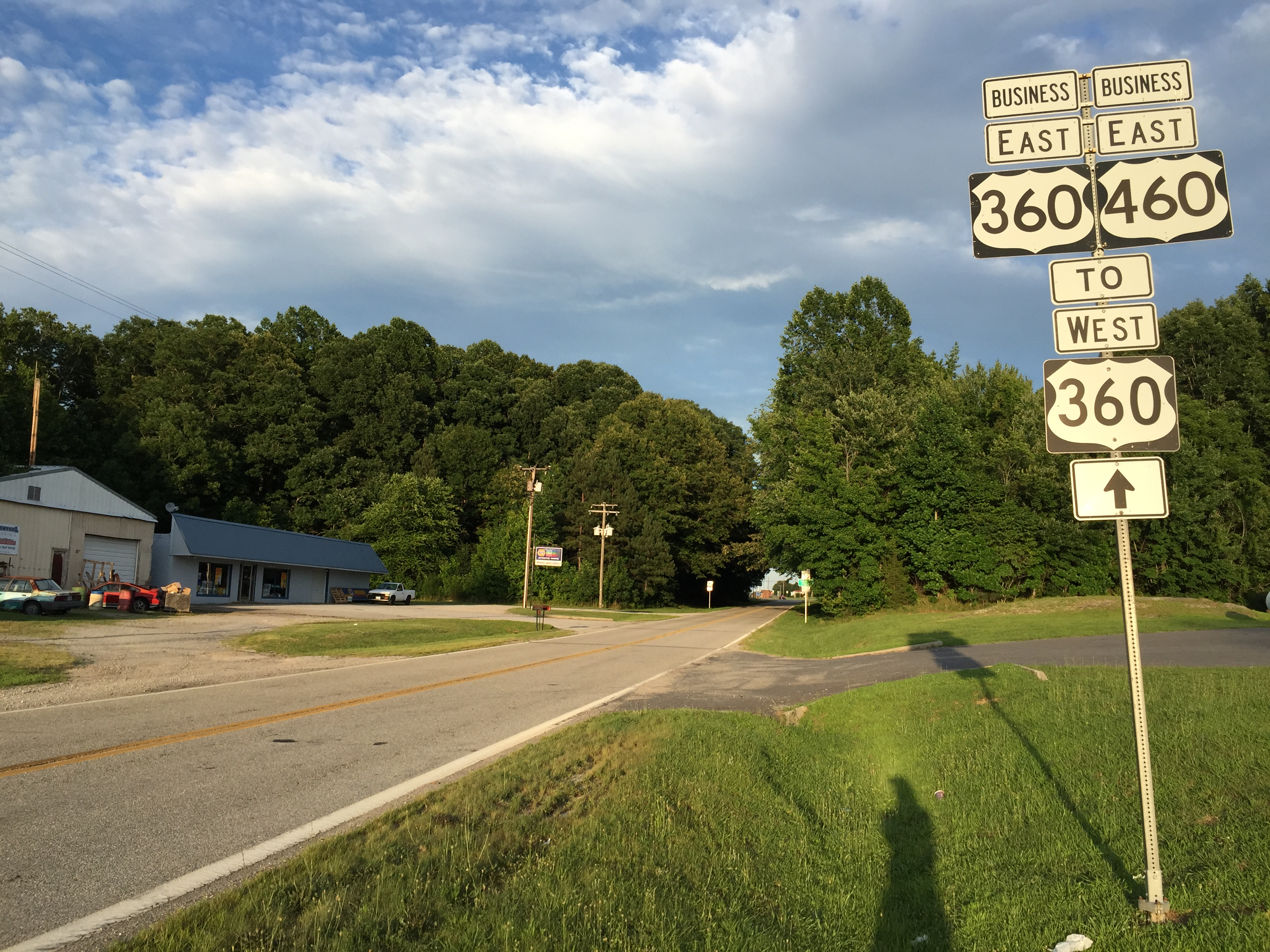
US 360 Bus. and US 460 Bus. at SR 716 just west of Burkeville

U.S. Route 360/460 Business (US 360/460 Bus.) is the shared business route of US 360 and US 460 in Nottoway County. The highway runs 1.13 miles (1.82 km) between junctions with US 360 and US 460 west and east of Burkeville. US 360/460 Business begins at the partial-cloverleaf interchange where the two highways begin to run concurrently west of Burkeville. There is no direct access from the westbound bypass to the eastbound business routes. The business routes pass through the town as 2nd Street before rejoining US 360 and US 460 a short distance west of their eastern divergence point.

=== Amelia Court House business route ===
U.S. Route 360 Business
- Location: Amelia Court House
- Length: 2.94 mi (4.73 km)

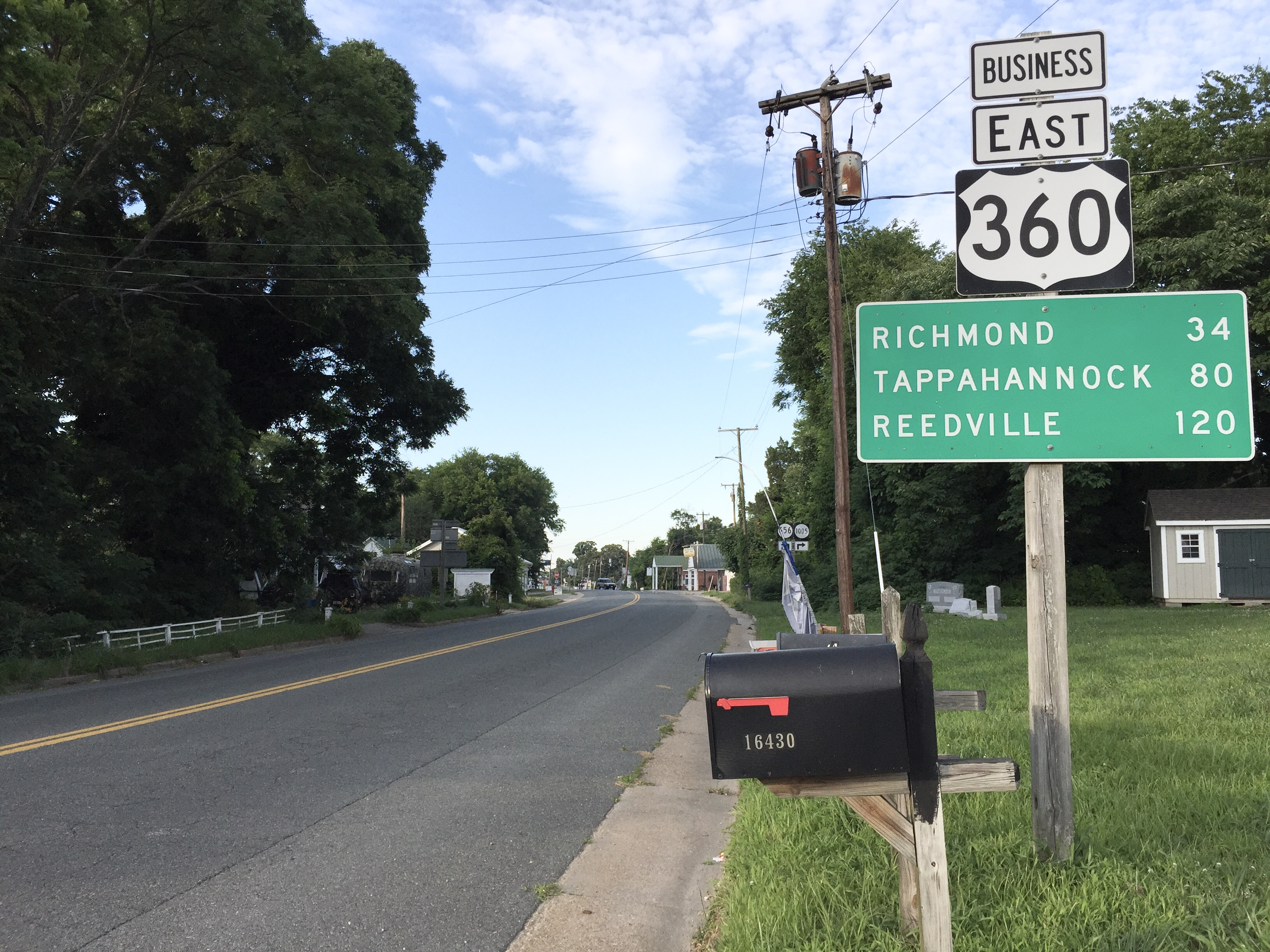
US 360 Bus. at SR 1009 in Amelia Court House

U.S. Route 360 Business (US 360 Business) is the business route of US 360 in Amelia County. The highway runs 2.94 miles (4.73 km) between junctions with US 360 west and northeast of Amelia Court House. US 360 Business is called Goodes Bridge Road and runs parallel to Norfolk Southern Railway's Richmond District along the northwest side of the village center, where the highway meets the western end of SR 38 (Virginia Street). Northeast of the village, the business route has a partial-cloverleaf interchange with US 360 before reaching its northern terminus at the mainline U.S. Highway.

=== Mechanicsville business route ===
U.S. Route 360 Business
- Location: Mechanicsville
- Length: 0.78 mi (1,260 m)

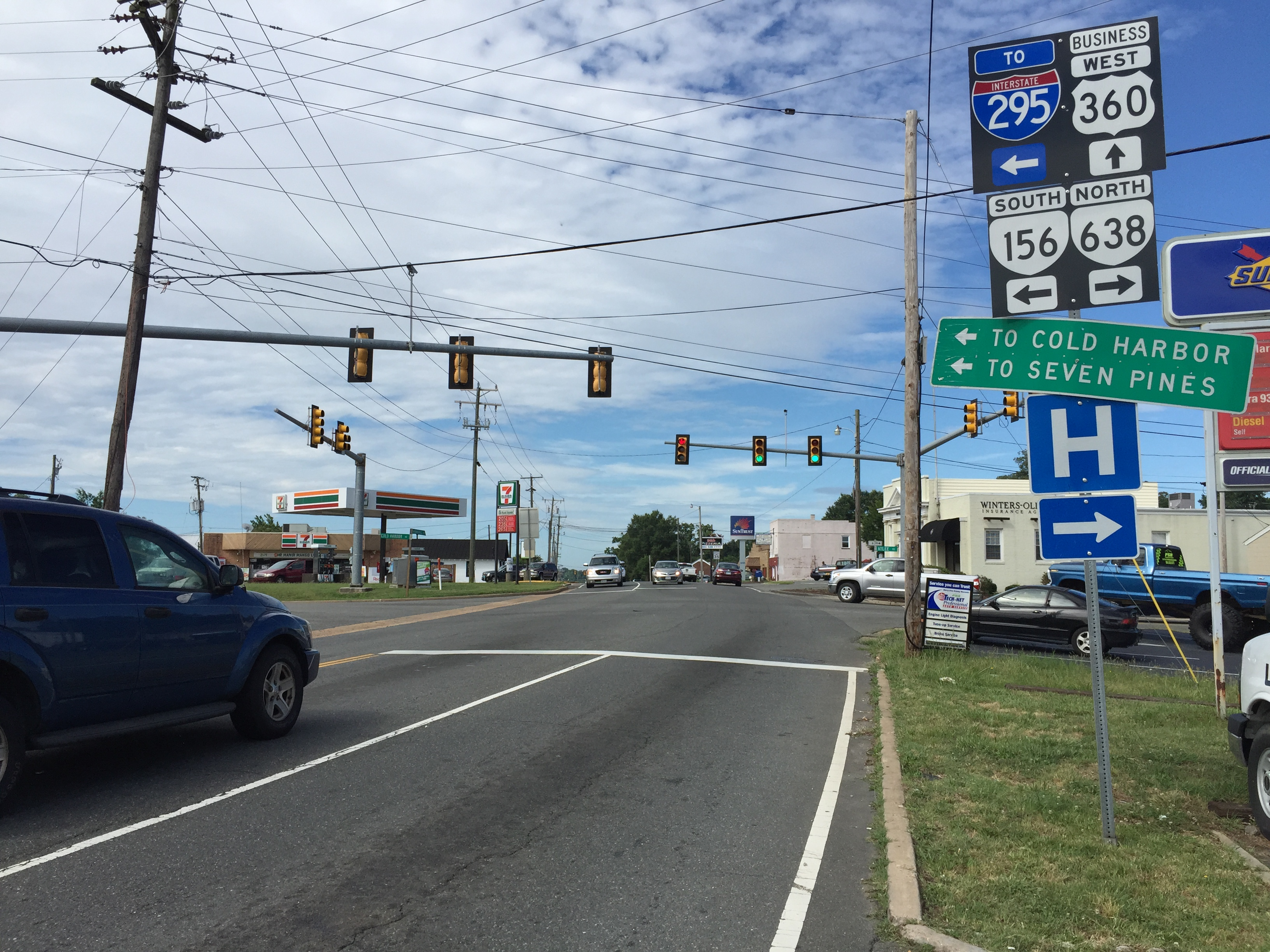
View west along US 360 Bus. at SR 156 and SR 638 in Mechanicsville

U.S. Route 360 Business (US 360 Business) is the business route of US 360 in Hanover County. The highway runs 0.78 miles (1.26 km) between junctions with US 360 west and east of Mechanicsville. The business route begins as a one-way westbound ramp to westbound US 360. US 360 Business gains an eastbound lane and heads east as Mechanicsville Turnpike to an intersection with SR 156 (Cold Harbor Road) and SR 638 (Atlee Road). The business route continues a few more blocks before again becoming a one-way westbound ramp from westbound US 360. This westbound ramp is used to access SR 156 from westbound US 360 because there is no direct ramp in US 360's diamond interchange with SR 156.
