= Edenetta =

Historic house in Virginia, United States

- U.S. National Register of Historic Places
- U.S. Historic district
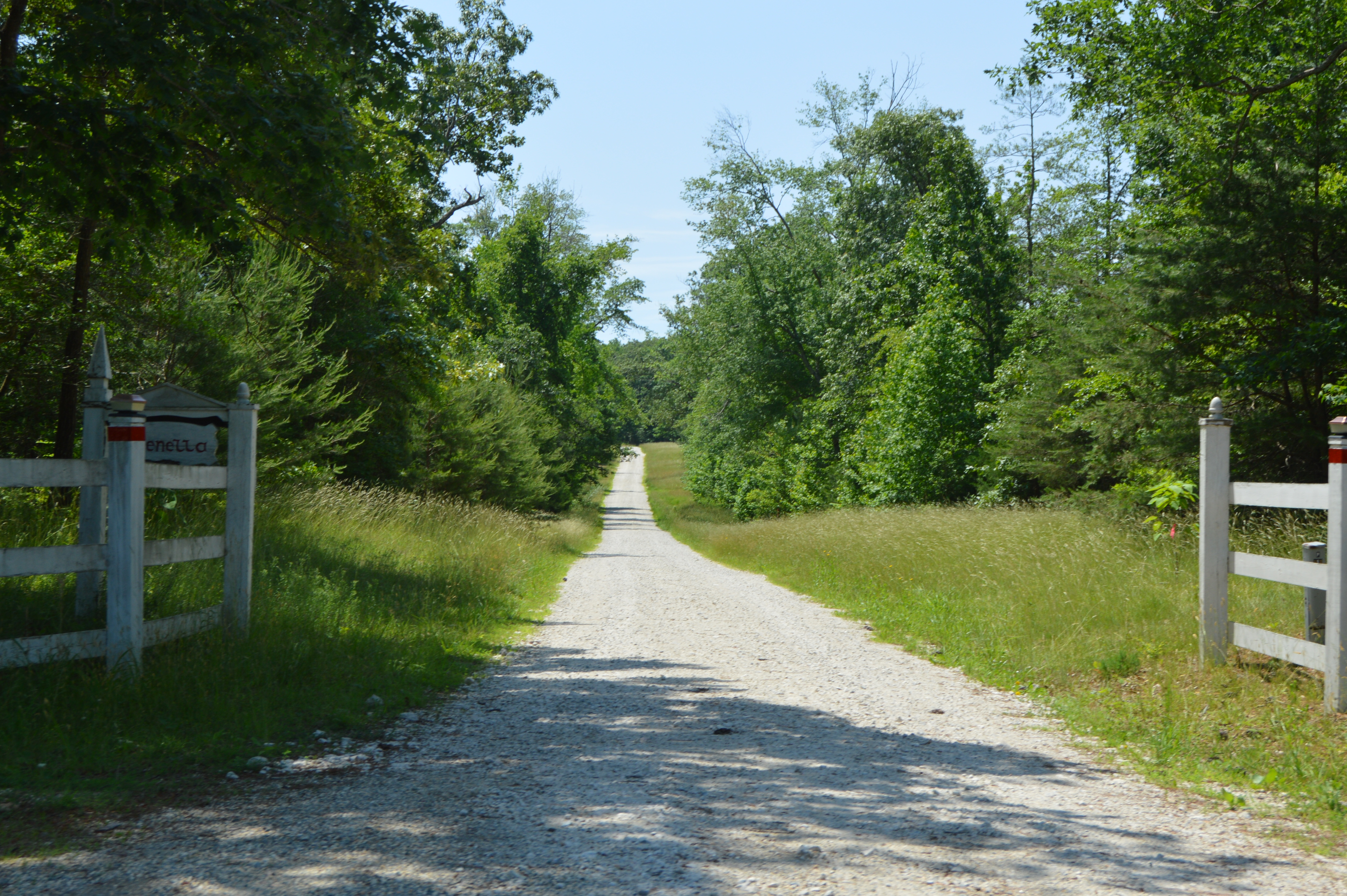
- Entrance

- Location within Virginia Location within the United States
- Location: 6514 Tidewater Trail, near Chance, Virginia
- Coordinates: 38°03′47″N 77°1′23″W
- Area: 263 acres (106 ha)
- NRHP reference No.: 16000796
- Added to NRHP: November 22, 2016

Edenetta is a historic farm property at 6514 Tidewater Trail (United States Route 17) in rural northern Essex County, Virginia, west of the hamlet of Chance. The main house is a two-story brick building, constructed in the first decade of the 19th century by a member of the locally prominent Waring family. It was originally Federal in style, but was given Greek Revival features in the 1840s. The property, which includes a smokehouse and kitchen, remained in the Waring family until 1984.

The property was listed on the National Register of Historic Places in 2016.

== See also ==
- National Register of Historic Places listings in Essex County, Virginia
