= Walter H. Stevens =

Confederate States Army brigadier general

Walter Husted Stevens
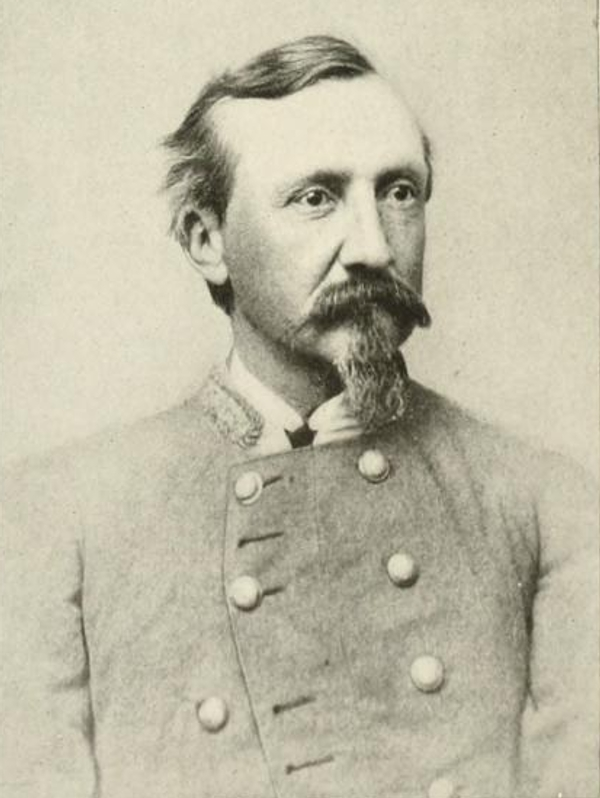
- Born: August 24, 1827; Penn Yan, New York
- Died: November 12, 1867 (aged 40); Veracruz, Mexico
- Burial place: Hollywood Cemetery, Richmond, Virginia
- Military career
- Allegiance: United States of America; Confederate States of America
- Branch: United States Army; Confederate States Army
- Service years: 1848–1861 (USA); 1861–1865 (CSA)
- Rank: First Lieutenant (USA); Brigadier General (CSA)
- Conflicts: American Civil War
- Other work: Railroad superintendent and engineer Mexican Imperial Railroad

Walter Husted Stevens (August 24, 1827 – November 12, 1867) was a Confederate States Army brigadier general during the American Civil War (Civil War). He graduated from the United States Military Academy at West Point, New York and served in the corps of engineers, mostly in Louisiana and Texas. He was an engineer for the Army of Northern Virginia. He was reputed to be the last uniformed man to cross the Mayo Bridge during the evacuation of Richmond, Virginia, after the Confederate defenses of Petersburg, Virginia, collapsed on April 2, 1865. After the Civil War, Stevens became the superintendent and engineer of the Mexican Imperial Railroad. He died of yellow fever at Vera Cruz, Mexico, November 12, 1867.

== Early life ==
Stevens was born August 24, 1827, at Penn Yan, New York. He graduated from the United States Military Academy at West Point, New York, fourth in his class of thirty-eight in 1848. He was assigned to the Corps of Engineers as a brevet second lieutenant on July 1, 1848. He was appointed a full grade second lieutenant on May 28, 1853, and a first lieutenant on July 1, 1855.

Stevens's Southern sympathy is explained by his corps of engineers service mainly in Louisiana and Texas and his marriage to a sister of Confederate Brigadier General Louis Hebert. Stevens offered his resignation from the U.S. Army on March 2, 1861, when Texas passed its ordinance of secession, but it was refused and he was dismissed from the service on a technicality on May 2, 1861. Meanwhile, on March 16, 1861, Stevens had been appointed a captain of engineers in the Army of the Confederate States (the regular army of the Confederate States).

== American Civil War service ==
Stevens was immediately promoted to major in the regular Confederate States Army on March 16, 1861. He was assigned as engineer for the Confederate Army at Pensacola, Florida in April 1861. Between June 1861 and June 1, 1862, he was assigned as engineer in the Confederate Army of the Potomac and, after its change of name, the Army of Northern Virginia. In this capacity he served under General P.G.T. Beauregard at the Battle of First Bull Run (First Manassas) and under General Joseph E. Johnston during the Peninsula Campaign and the Battle of Seven Pines. Stevens was promoted to lieutenant colonel on January 31, 1862.

From June 1, 1862, to February 1864, Stevens was assigned as engineer in the Department of Richmond, which he strengthened. He was promoted to colonel on March 3, 1863. He was assigned to the Defenses of Richmond, in the Department of Richmond, from February 1864 to July 20, 1864. On July 20, 1864, he returned as chief engineer in the Army of Northern Virginia and served with it through the Siege of Petersburg, strengthening the defenses of that city, and the Appomattox Campaign. Stevens was promoted to brigadier general on August 28, 1864, under the law permitting Confederate President Jefferson Davis to appoint twenty special brigadier generals. Historians Ezra J. Warner and Jeffry D. Wert say Stevens was supposedly the last uniformed man to cross the Mayo Bridge at Richmond, Virginia, when the Confederate States Army and Confederate government evacuated Richmond on the night of April 2, 1865, after the fall of the defenses of Petersburg, Virginia, at the Battle of Five Forks and the Third Battle of Petersburg. Stevens was paroled at Appomattox Court House on April 9, 1865.

== Aftermath ==
After the Civil War, Stevens went to Mexico where he was superintendent and engineer for the Mexican Imperial Railroad, a railroad line planned by Emperor Maximilian I of Mexico to run between Vera Cruz and Mexico City, Mexico. Stevens died of yellow fever at Vera Cruz, November 12, 1867. He is buried in Hollywood Cemetery, Richmond Virginia.

== See also ==
- List of American Civil War generals (Confederate)
