= Horse Head =

Horse Head may refer to:

- Horse Head, Virginia
- Horse Head (South Georgia), a rocky point on South Georgia
- Horse Head Island in Greenland
- Horse Head, an American musician who is a member of the collective GothBoiClique
- Horse Head (Turkish: AT Kafası) with his real name Berkay Akçay is a Turkish YouTuber.

== See also ==
- Horsehead (disambiguation)
- Horse head mask
- Horse-head fiddle (disambiguation)
