= Claraville, Virginia =

Unincorporated community in Virginia, US

Coordinates: 37°55′02″N 76°26′44″W

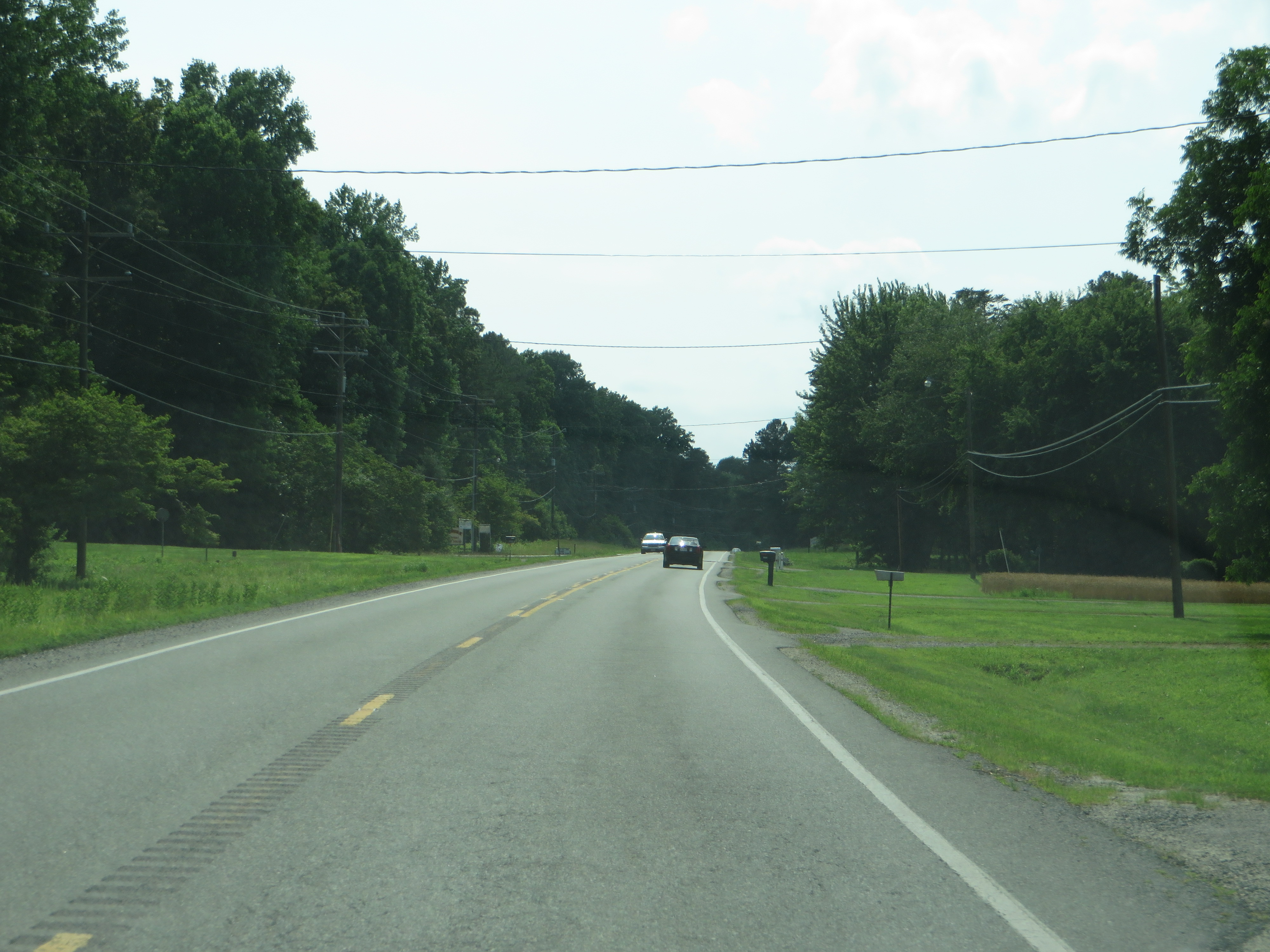
U.S. Route 360 in Claraville

Claraville is an unincorporated community in Northumberland County, in the U.S. state of Virginia.
