= Vauter's Church =

Historic church in Virginia, US

- U.S. National Register of Historic Places
- Virginia Landmarks Register
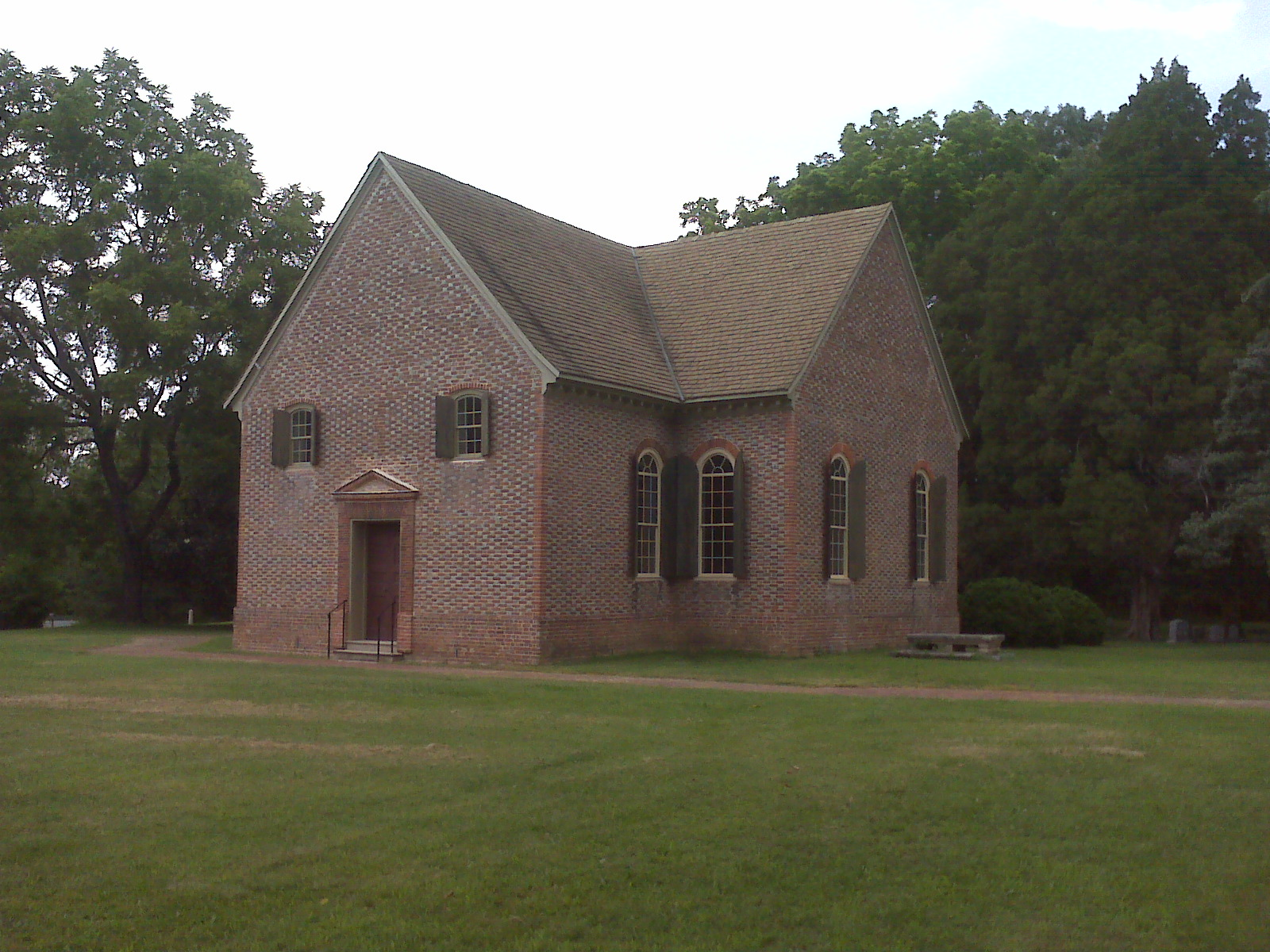
- Vauter's Episcopal Church

- Location within Virginia Location within the United States
- Location: 1 mi. NW of Loretto on U.S. 17, Loretto, Virginia
- Coordinates: 38°5′12″N 77°04′07″W
- Area: 10 acres (4.0 ha)
- Built: 1719, 1731
- Architectural style: Colonial
- NRHP reference No.: 72001391
- VLR No.: 028-0042

Significant dates
- Added to NRHP: December 5, 1972
- Designated VLR: August 15, 1972

Vauter's Church, also known as Vauter's Episcopal Church, is a historic Episcopal church located at Loretto, Essex County, Virginia. It was built in 1719, and is a one-story, T-shaped brick building with a gable roof. The south wing was added in 1731. Vauter's is the upper Church of St. Anne's Parish.

It was listed on the National Register of Historic Places in 1972.
