= Woodlawn (Miller's Tavern, Virginia) =

Historic house in Virginia, United States

- U.S. National Register of Historic Places
- Virginia Landmarks Register
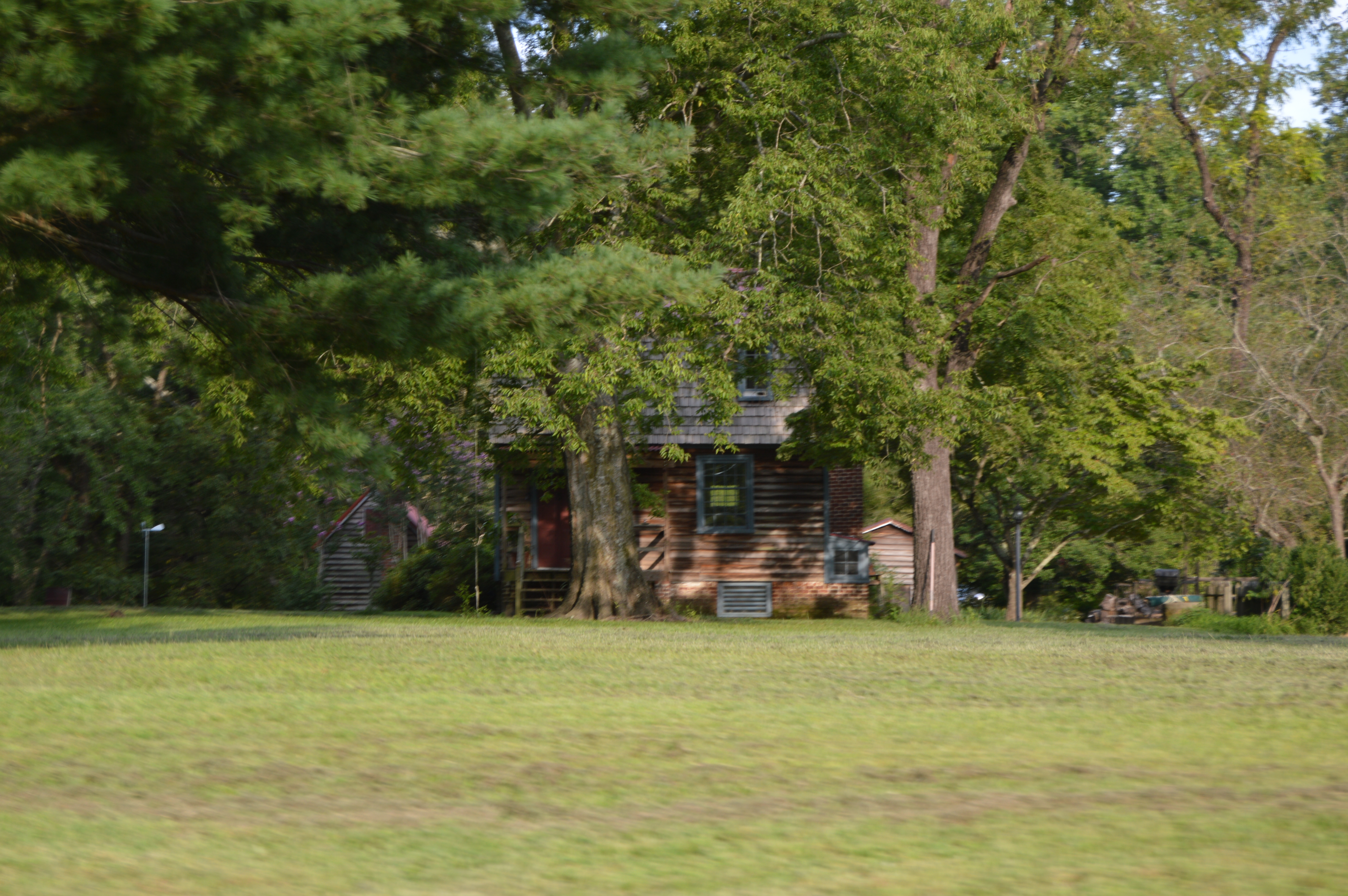
- Roadside view

- Location within Virginia Location within the United States
- Location: NE of Miller's Tavern, near Miller's Tavern, Virginia
- Coordinates: 37°51′07″N 76°55′11″W
- Area: 5 acres (2.0 ha)
- Built: c. 1816-1820, 1840
- NRHP reference No.: 80004187
- VLR No.: 028-0047

Significant dates
- Added to NRHP: July 16, 1980
- Designated VLR: February 21, 1978

Woodlawn, also known as the Trible House, is a historic home located near Miller's Tavern, Essex County, Virginia. It was built about 1816–1820, and is a 1 1/2-story, two-bay, frame dwelling with a gambrel roof. It features two exterior end chimneys constructed of brick. A lean-to addition was built about 1840.

It was listed on the National Register of Historic Places in 1980.
