= Horsehead =

Horsehead may refer to:

- The head of a horse
- Horsehead (band), an Australian rock band
- Horsehead Corporation, an American corporation producing zinc products
- Horsehead Nebula, a dark nebula in the constellation of Orion
- A pumpjack, or horsehead, part of an oilwell's pump
- Horse Head, an American musician who is a member of the collective GothBoiClique

== See also ==
- Horse Head (disambiguation)
- Horse head mask
- Horseheads, New York, a town
- Hogshead, a measure of volume, especially alcoholic liquids
