= Mayo Bridge =

Mayo's Bridge
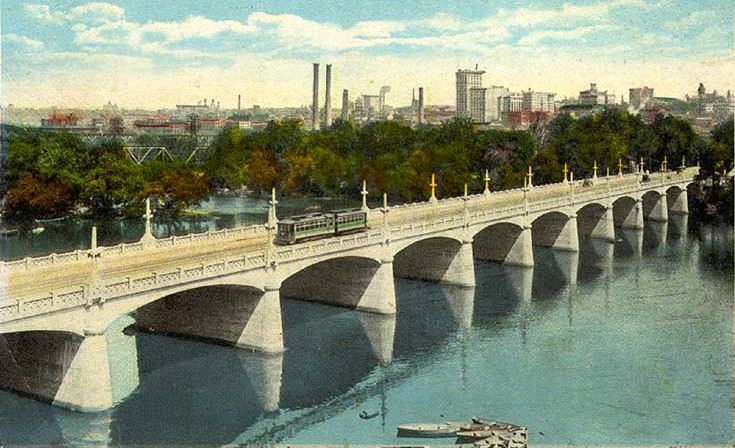
- Mayo's Bridge ca. 1917
- Coordinates: 37°31′45″N 77°26′03″W
- Carries: US 360
- Crosses: James River
- Locale: Richmond, Virginia
- Official name: Mayo's Bridge
- Other name(s): 14th. St. Bridge; Mayo's Bridge
- Maintained by: Richmond Dept. of Public Works

Characteristics
- Total length: 1,374 feet

History
- Opened: 1913

Statistics
- Toll: none

Location
- Interactive map of Mayo's Bridge

Mayo's Bridge (also known as Richmond's 14th St. Bridge) is located in Richmond, Virginia. A four lane structure, it transports U.S. Route 360 across the James River. Signage identifies the bridge as "Mayo's Bridge".

The bridge is in two sections, separated near the middle by Mayo's Island. The total length is 1,374 feet (north and south sections combined). The current structure was built in 1913, and accommodated heavy streetcar traffic. It is Richmond's oldest highway bridge across the James River.

Prior to the construction of Mayo's Bridge, travelers had to utilize Coutts' Ferry, run by Patrick Coutts until his death in 1776 and later by his brother Rev. William Coutts until his death in 1787. The ferry landing was at a place called the "Sandy Bar" at the end of 18th Street. The ferry was kept up for many years after the bridge was built as the 6.25¢ toll was impressive and the bridge was often broken, thus necessitating the ferry. Patrick Coutts was something of a legend in old Richmond. This stemmed from the story that he had crossed the river not by ferry or bridge, but by sturgeon.

Many people petitioned the Virginia Assembly for the right to build a bridge, but none were successful in receiving permission. Around the mid-1780s, John Mayo, son of William Mayo (the man who had laid out the plan for Richmond), was given the opportunity to build a toll bridge but died soon after. His son, John Mayo Jr., inherited his estate and finally completed the first bridge across the James in 1788. This bridge was very rudimentary and consisted of “large logs, raft-like, spiked to the rocks, with rough floor laid on the logs” on the north side of Mayo's Island and of a pontoon bridge that had planks laid on top of a series of boats on the south side. This bridge was destroyed the winter after its completion by ice floes dragging the bridge away. It was destroyed and subsequently rebuilt in 1814, 1816, 1823, 1865, 1870, 1877, 1882, and 1899.

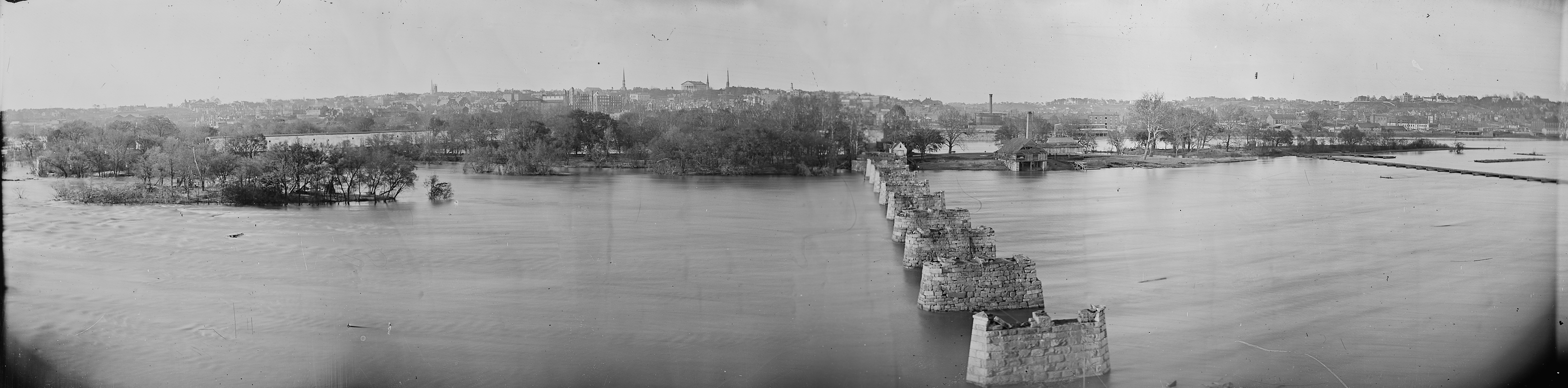
The burnt-out Mayo Bridge among the ruined city of Richmond at the end of the Civil War.

It was built on the site of the city's first bridge completed in 1788 by John Mayo Jr., the grandson of the man who first laid out Richmond's grid pattern. During the American Civil War the bridge was burned by retreating Confederate soldiers on April 8, 1865.

In 1882, the a portion of the bridge collapsed with nine people on it; however, no one was killed or badly hurt in the incident.

Rising just 30 feet above the water line, Mayo's Bridge is currently Richmond's only bridge subject to flooding. Large floodgates in Richmond's flood wall protect the surrounding areas on each side during James River flooding. The bridge's closeness to the river surface has made the sidewalks on either side of it popular fishing locations.
