= Monte Verde (Center Cross, Virginia) =

Historic house in Virginia, United States

- U.S. National Register of Historic Places
- Virginia Landmarks Register
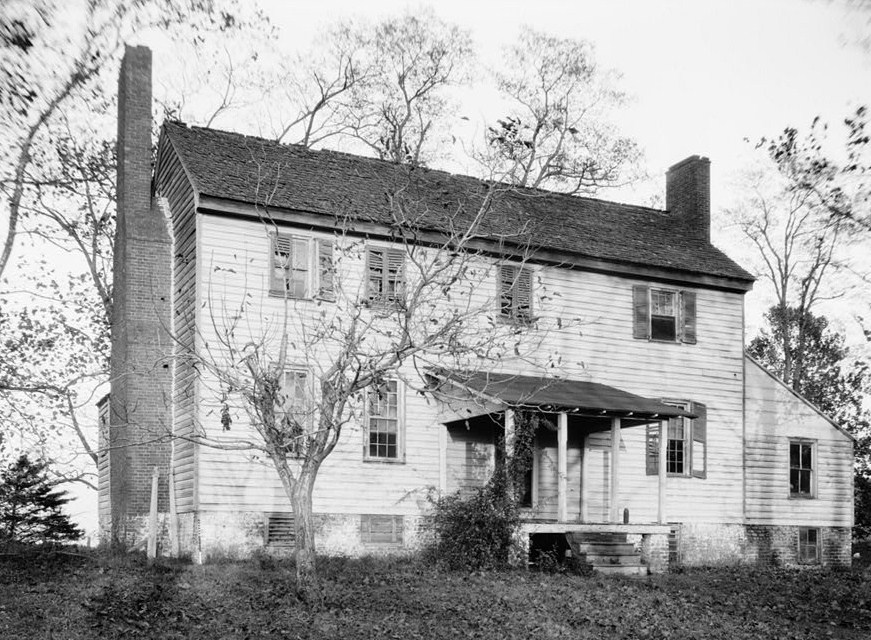
- Mount Verde, HABS Photo

- Location within Virginia Location within the United States
- Location: 405 Monte Verde Rd., Center Cross, Virginia
- Coordinates: 37°48′23″N 76°46′06″W
- Area: 12.8 acres (5.2 ha)
- Built: c. 1815
- Built by: Janey, Joseph
- Architectural style: Federal
- NRHP reference No.: 02000586
- VLR No.: 028-0029

Significant dates
- Added to NRHP: May 30, 2002
- Designated VLR: March 13, 2002

Monte Verde, also known as Omnium Hill, is a historic plantation house located at Center Cross, Essex County, Virginia United States. It was built about 1815, and is a two-story, frame dwelling clad in weatherboard. It has two one-story wings added in 1958. The interior features original Federal style woodwork.

It was listed on the National Register of Historic Places in 2002.
