= Wheatland (Loretto, Virginia) =

Historic house in Virginia, United States

- U.S. National Register of Historic Places
- Virginia Landmarks Register
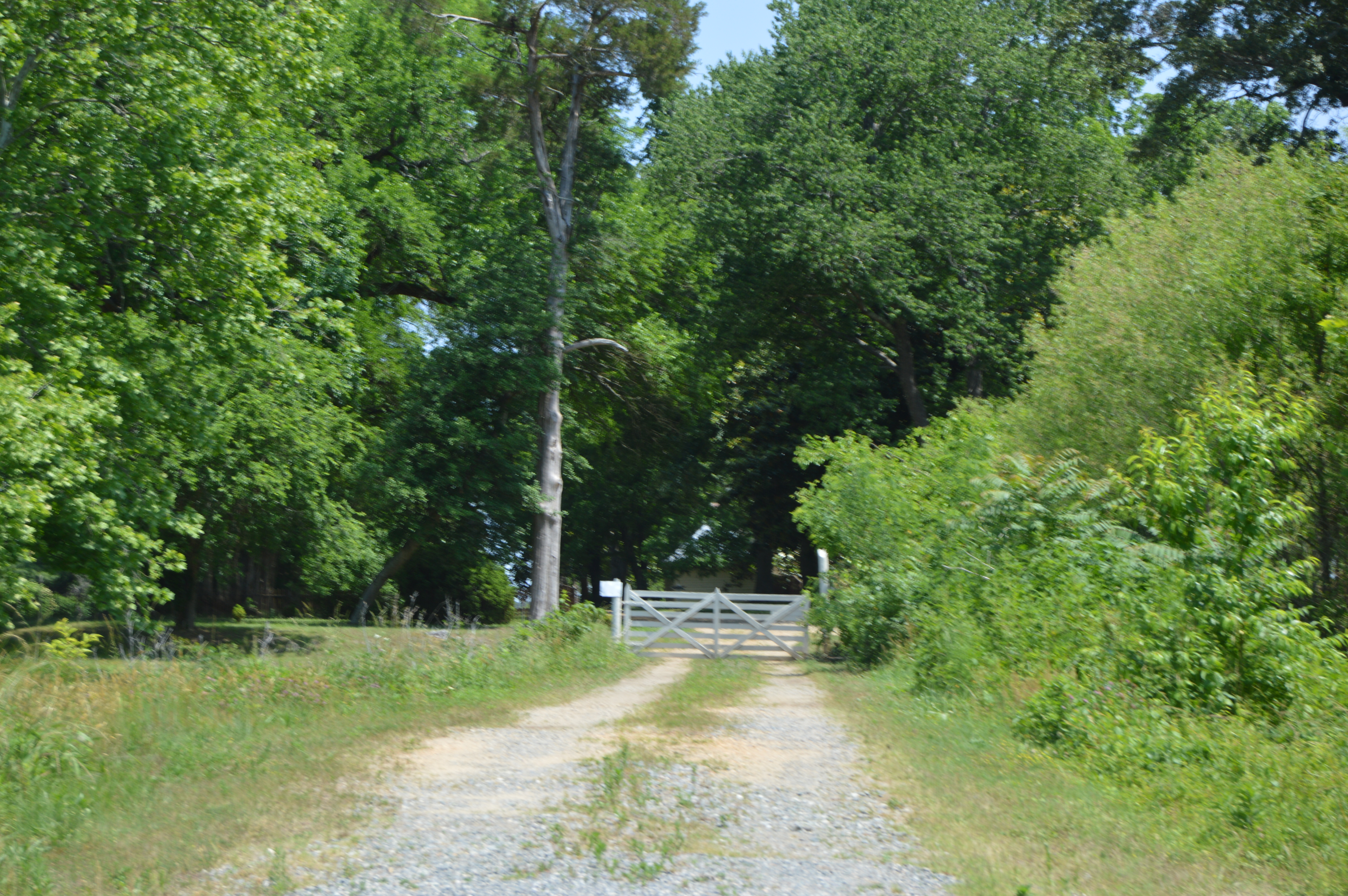
- Property entrance

- Location within Virginia Location within the United States
- Location: VA 638 between US 17 and the Rappahanock River, Loretto, Virginia
- Coordinates: 38°05′04″N 77°03′35″W
- Area: 350 acres (140 ha)
- Built: 1849-1851
- Architectural style: Greek Revival
- NRHP reference No.: 89001918
- VLR No.: 028-0044

Significant dates
- Added to NRHP: December 19, 1990
- Designated VLR: September 20, 1988

Wheatland is a historic plantation home located near Loretto, Essex County, Virginia. It was built between 1849 and 1851, and is a two-story, five-bay, frame dwelling with a hipped roof in the Greek Revival style. It has a double-pile central hall plan, and features two-story porches on the principal facades. A simple one-story gable-roofed frame wing contains a kitchen. The property includes a contributing wharf (1916), smokehouse and kitchen.

It was listed on the National Register of Historic Places in 1990.
