= St. Matthew's Church (Champlain, Virginia) =

Historic church in Virginia, US

- U.S. National Register of Historic Places
- Virginia Landmarks Register
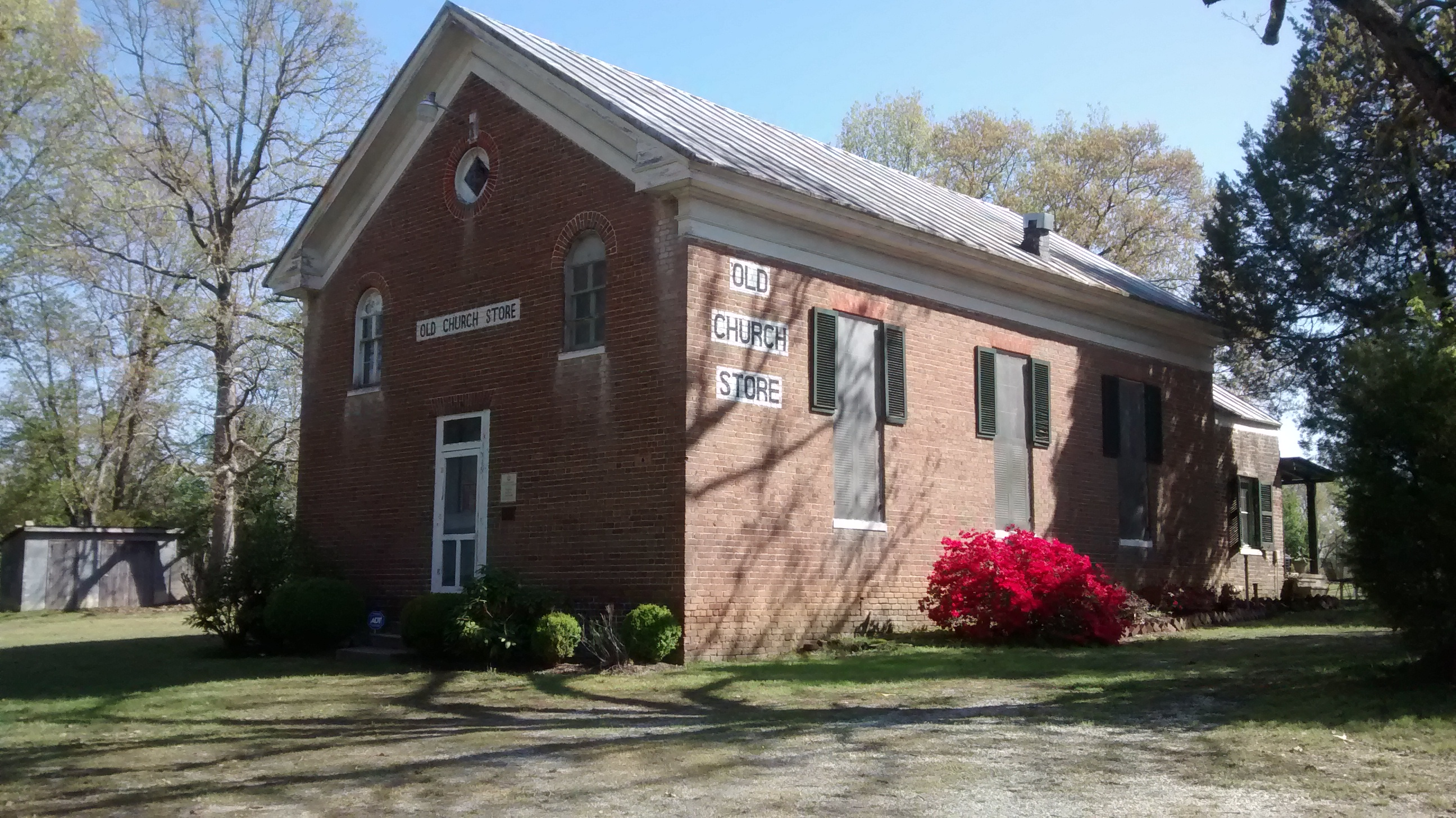

- Location within Virginia Location within the United States
- Location: Jct. of VA 17, VA 631, and VA 724, Champlain, Virginia
- Coordinates: 38°0′57″N 76°59′28″W
- Area: 4.3 acres (1.7 ha)
- Built: 1860-1865
- Architectural style: Greek Revival
- NRHP reference No.: 03001429
- VLR No.: 028-0038

Significant dates
- Added to NRHP: January 16, 2004
- Designated VLR: September 10, 2003

St. Matthew's Church is a historic Episcopal church in Champlain, Virginia, United States. It was built between 1860 and 1865, and is a one-story, one bay, gable-end-entry, rectangular brick building. It was consecrated in 1870 and served the residents for 100 years, until its conversion to a general store in 1970.

It was listed on the National Register of Historic Places in 2004.
