= Cherry Walk =

Historic house in Virginia, United States

- U.S. National Register of Historic Places
- Virginia Landmarks Register
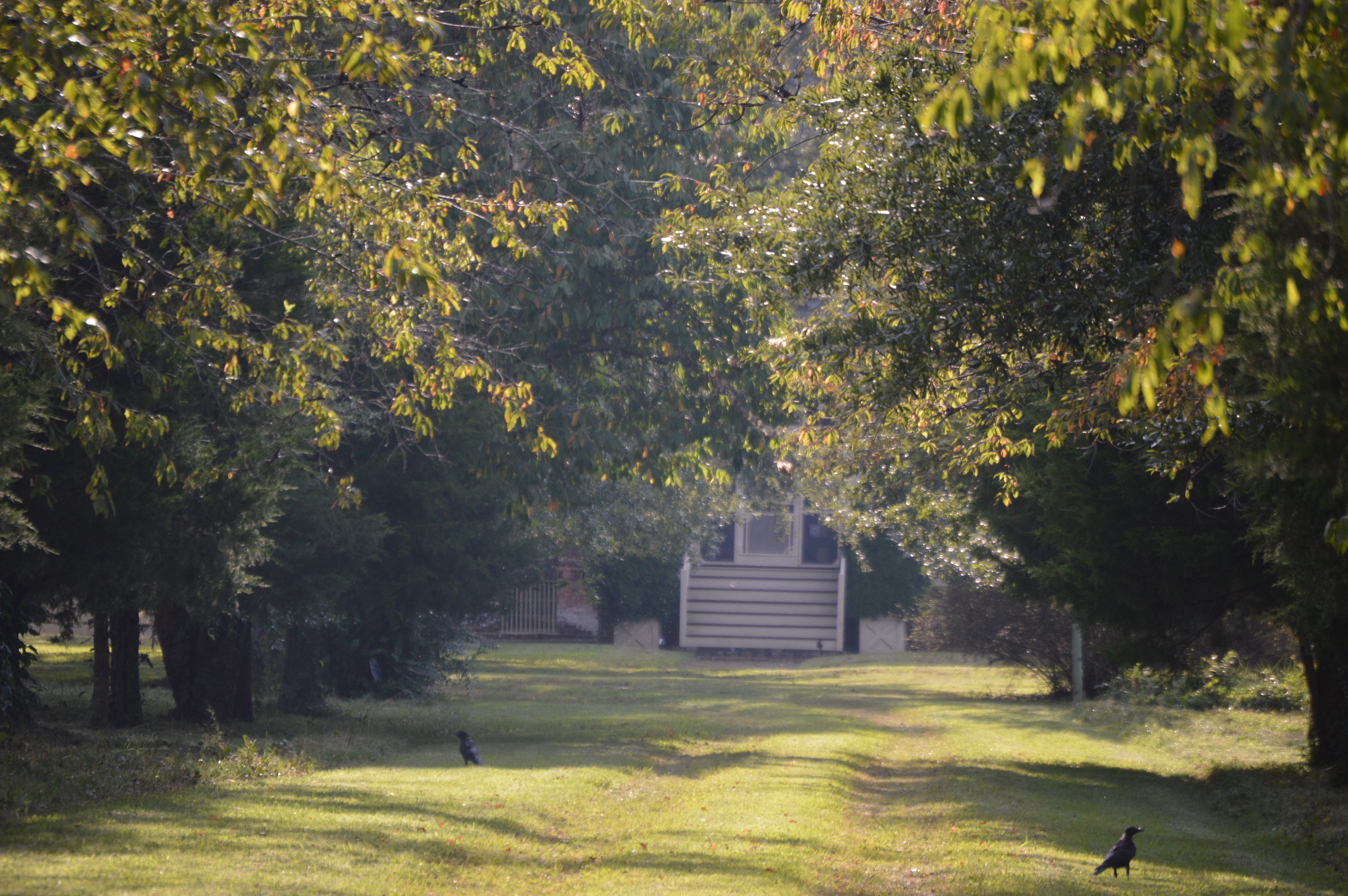
- Roadside view

- Location within Virginia Location within the United States
- Location: S of Dunbrooke on VA 620, near Dunbrooke, Virginia
- Coordinates: 37°51′38″N 76°57′06″W
- Area: 95.1 acres (38.5 ha)
- NRHP reference No.: 83003280
- VLR No.: 028-0008

Significant dates
- Added to NRHP: February 10, 1983
- Designated VLR: December 14, 1982

Cherry Walk, also known as Cherry Row, is a historic home and farm complex located near Dunbrooke, Essex County, Virginia. The house is dated to the late-18th century, and is a 1 1/2-story, five-bay, brick dwelling with a gambrel roof. Also on the property are the contributing two dairies, a smokehouse, a kitchen, a privy, a large wooden barn encasing an older barn, a plank construction storage shed, a ruinous blacksmith shop, and the sites of other old outbuildings.

It was listed on the National Register of Historic Places in 1983.
