= Glencairn (Chance, Virginia) =

Historic house in Virginia, United States

- U.S. National Register of Historic Places
- Virginia Landmarks Register
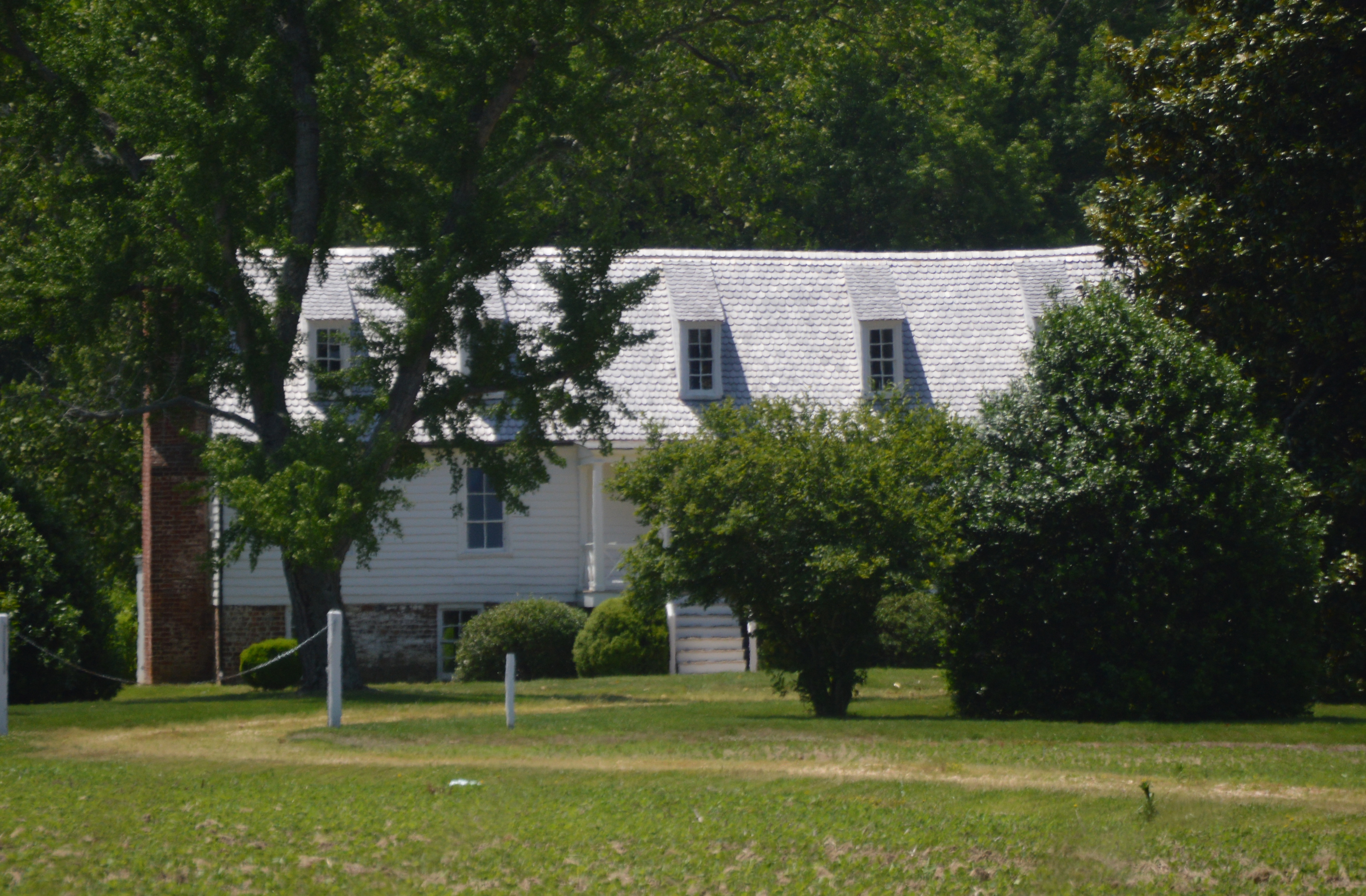
- Distant view

- Location within Virginia Location within the United States
- Location: N of Chance off U.S. 17, near Chance, Virginia
- Coordinates: 38°3′54″N 77°0′43″W
- Area: 2 acres (0.81 ha)
- Architectural style: Colonial
- NRHP reference No.: 79003036
- VLR No.: 028-0015

Significant dates
- Added to NRHP: May 14, 1979
- Designated VLR: February 21, 1978

Glencairn is a historic plantation house located near Chance, Essex County, Virginia. It dates to the Colonial era, and is a long 1 1/2-story, six-bay, brick-nogged frame dwelling. It sits on a high brick basement and is clad in 19th-century weatherboard. The house is topped by a gable roof with dormers. The house was built in several sections, with the oldest section possibly dated to 1730.

It was listed on the National Register of Historic Places in 1979.
