= Linden (Champlain, Virginia) =

Historic house in Virginia, United States

- Linden Manor House
- U.S. National Register of Historic Places
- Virginia Landmarks Register
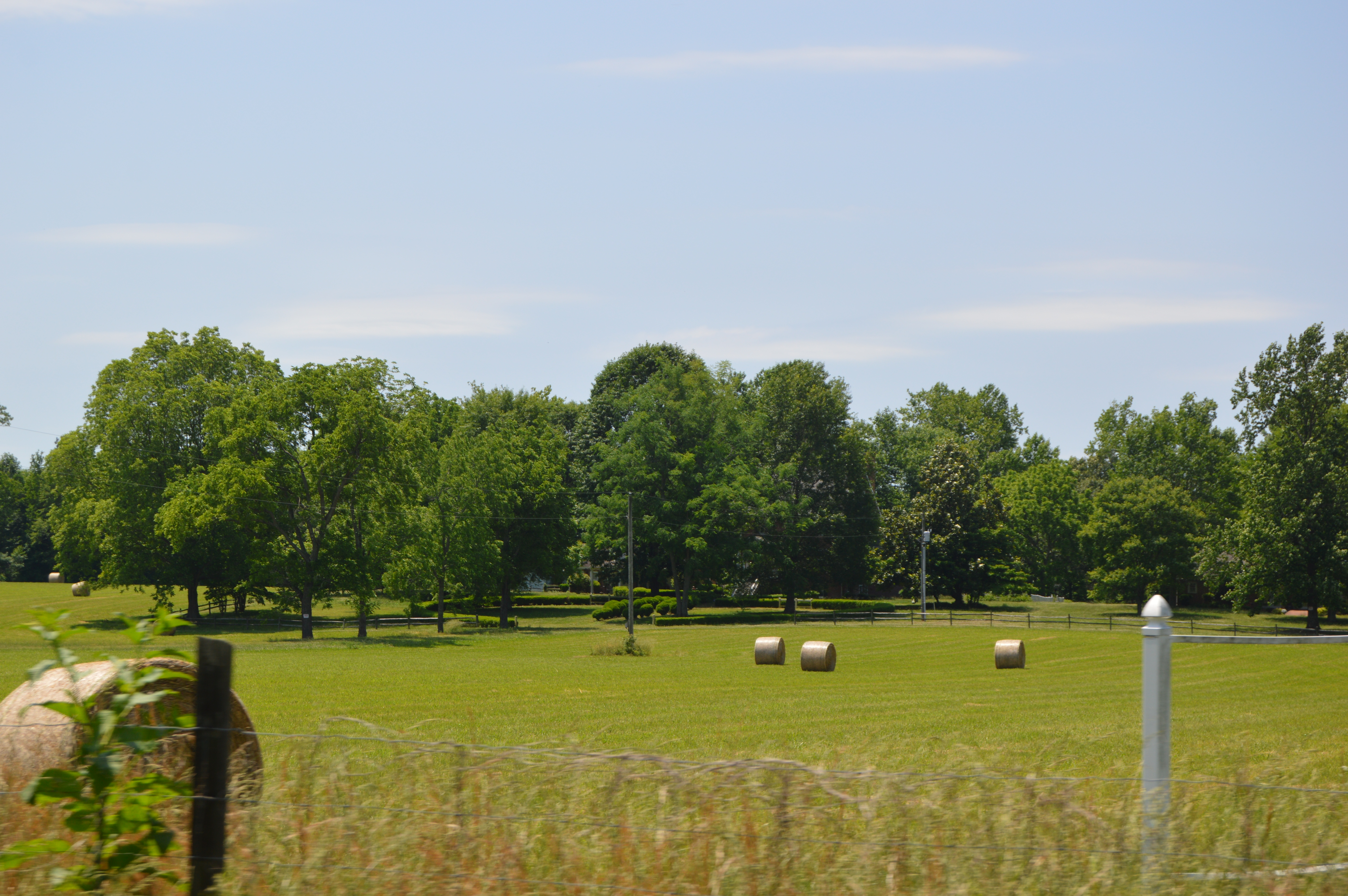
- Distant view from U.S. Route 17
- Location: U.S. Route 17, 0.5 miles south of Champlain, Virginia
- Coordinates: 38°0′19″N 76°59′13″W
- Area: 20.7 acres (8.4 ha)
- Built: c. 1825
- Architectural style: Federal
- NRHP reference No.: 92001397
- VLR No.: 028-0024

Significant dates
- Added to NRHP: October 15, 1992
- Designated VLR: December 1, 1991

Linden is a historic home located near Champlain, Essex County, Virginia. and is a 2 1/2-story, three-bay, nearly square, brick dwelling in the Federal style. It has a side gable roof and side-passage plan.

== Description ==
Although some of the lands on the original tract has been sold, Linden Manor house still stands on 204 acres. It is surrounded on three sides by forestry and is located 335 yards from U.S. Hwy 17. Because of the isolation, the house and its immediate surroundings have retained the integrity of a nineteenth-century farm. The Manor house is the only remaining nineteenth-century building on the site, however, several outbuilding foundations, including a possible smokehouse and kitchen, have been found, in addition to a small, private cemetery. Much of the woodwork dates to the early years of the house, including four carved Greek-style mantels and the pine floors on the first and second stories. The house is a remarkable and little-altered example of nineteenth-century Federal-style architecture and incorporates some of the finest brickwork in Essex County

Also on the property is an unmarked cemetery.

The historic Linden Manor house is on the Virginia Historic Registry and National Register of Historic Places in 1992.

Manor House (circa 1825)

Federal Style house containing a gross floor area of 5,054 +/- sf. on 4 levels

Entering the English basement level there is a long hall with pine flooring, a large dining room w/fireplace. The kitchen with a fireplace, blue tile, oak cabinetry furnished in casual, farmhouse comfort. The basement also has a utility room which includes washer and dryer hook-up as well as a bathroom.

On the main level is the entry hall, off which is a large parlor w/fireplace, plaster walls and dentil crown molding. To the rear of the main floor is another parlor w/pine flooring, built-in bookcases and dentil trim. At the end of the hall is a sunroom. The Dining room, fireplace, pine flooring with touches of "farmhouse chic".

On the second level original pine wood flooring, dentil crown molding, stairway and banister.

Other rooms include:

- Sunroom with outside access through French doors
- Grand Hall with outside access through the front door, onto a covered porch (9’ x 10’), a few steps away from the entrance to the front lawn and shrub-bordered processional path.
- Library, fireplace, built-in oak shelving in a casual repose, outside access onto a lovely, furnished porch (12’ x 12’) overlooking the perennial flower garden.
- Formal Parlor, with fireplace and Victorian antiquities.
- Third level enters a large hall with original pine flooring, dentil crown molding, and:

- (2) large bedrooms with (2) private, full baths, tiled floors

- Fourth level offers views of the grounds

- (2) bedrooms and (2) full baths

There are 2 porches. The front covered porch is raised and measures 9' x 10'. The covered side porch measures 12' x 12'

'Carriage House' Located close to Linden Manor House, the Carriage House is a reproduction of an early 19th-century carriage house where horse carriages were stored. This brick 2 story structure was constructed in 1992, and has a gable roof, solid masonry foundation, framed dormers and covered front porch w/brick floor (794 +/- sf. footprint and 1,282 +/- total sf).

Event Hall' Also located close by to Linden Manor House and the Carriage House, this brick structure was constructed in 1999.
