= Horse Head, Virginia =

Unincorporated community in Virginia, US

Coordinates: 37°53′31″N 76°25′08″W

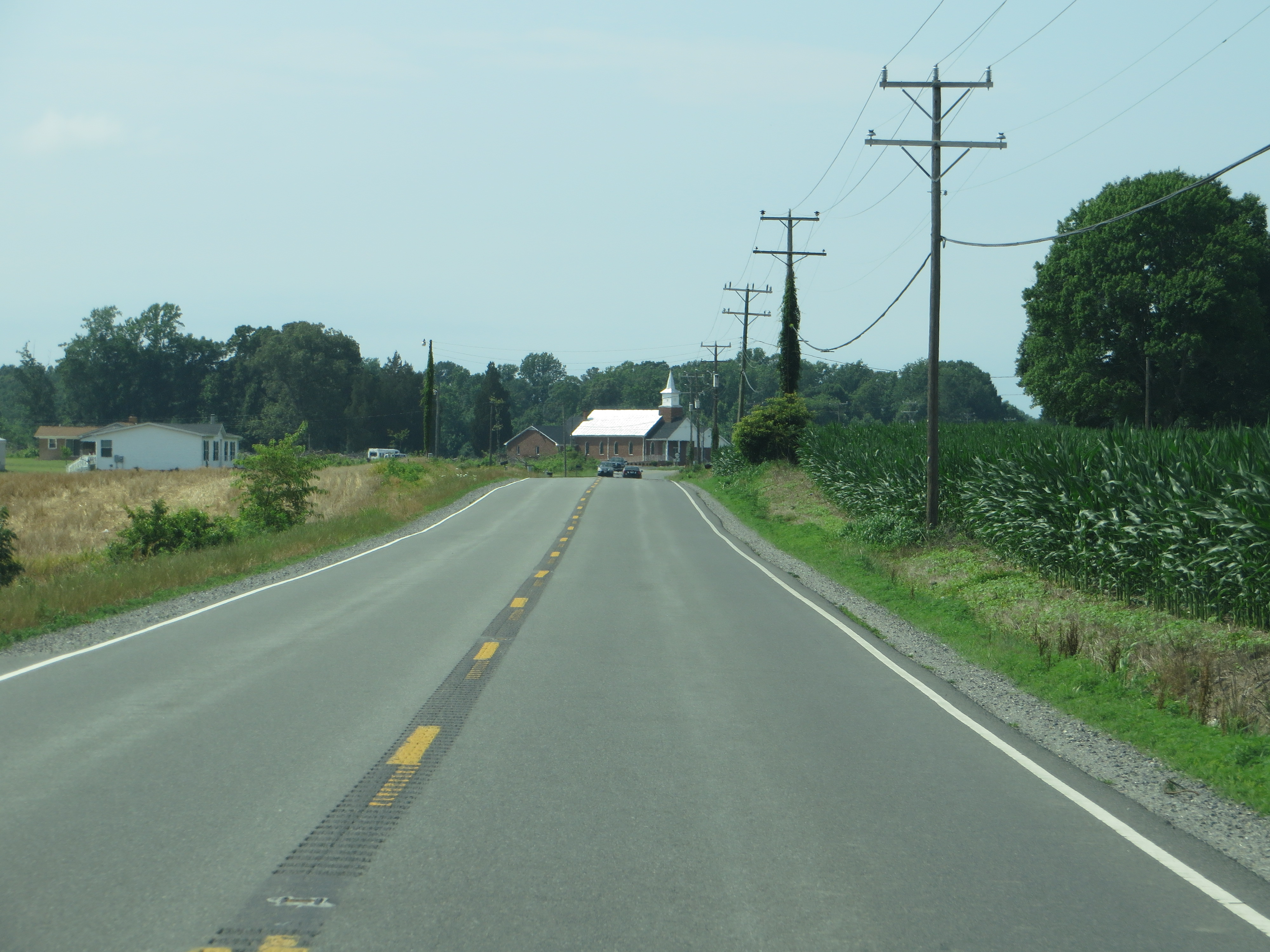
U.S. Route 360 in Horse Head

Horse Head is an unincorporated community in Northumberland County, in the U.S. state of Virginia.
