= Loretto, Virginia =

Unincorporated community in Virginia, United States

- Unincorporated community
- Location within Virginia Location within the United States
- Coordinates: 38°04′34″N 77°03′02″W
- Country: United States
- State: Virginia
- County: Essex
- Elevation: 161 ft (49 m)
- Time zone: UTC-5 (Eastern (EST))
  - Summer (DST): UTC-4 (EDT)
- ZIP code: 22509
- Area code: 804
- GNIS feature ID: 1495873

Loretto is an unincorporated community in Essex County, in the U.S. state of Virginia.

Brooke's Bank, Elmwood, Port Micou, Vauter's Church, and Wheatland are listed on the National Register of Historic Places.
