= Champlain, Virginia =

Unincorporated community in Virginia, United States

- Unincorporated community
- Location within Virginia Location within the United States
- Coordinates: 38°00′48″N 76°59′34″W
- Country: United States
- State: Virginia
- County: Essex
- Elevation: 151 ft (46 m)
- Time zone: UTC-5 (Eastern (EST))
  - Summer (DST): UTC-4 (EDT)
- ZIP code: 22438
- Area code: 804
- GNIS feature ID: 1492742

Champlain is an unincorporated community in Essex County, Virginia, United States. It lies at the junction of U.S. Route 17 and Route 631 in a rural region of the county.

Champlain's zip code is 22438.

The Glebe House of St. Anne's Parish, St. Matthew's Church, and Linden are listed on the National Register of Historic Places.
