= Port Micou =

Historic house in Virginia, United States

- U.S. National Register of Historic Places
- Virginia Landmarks Register
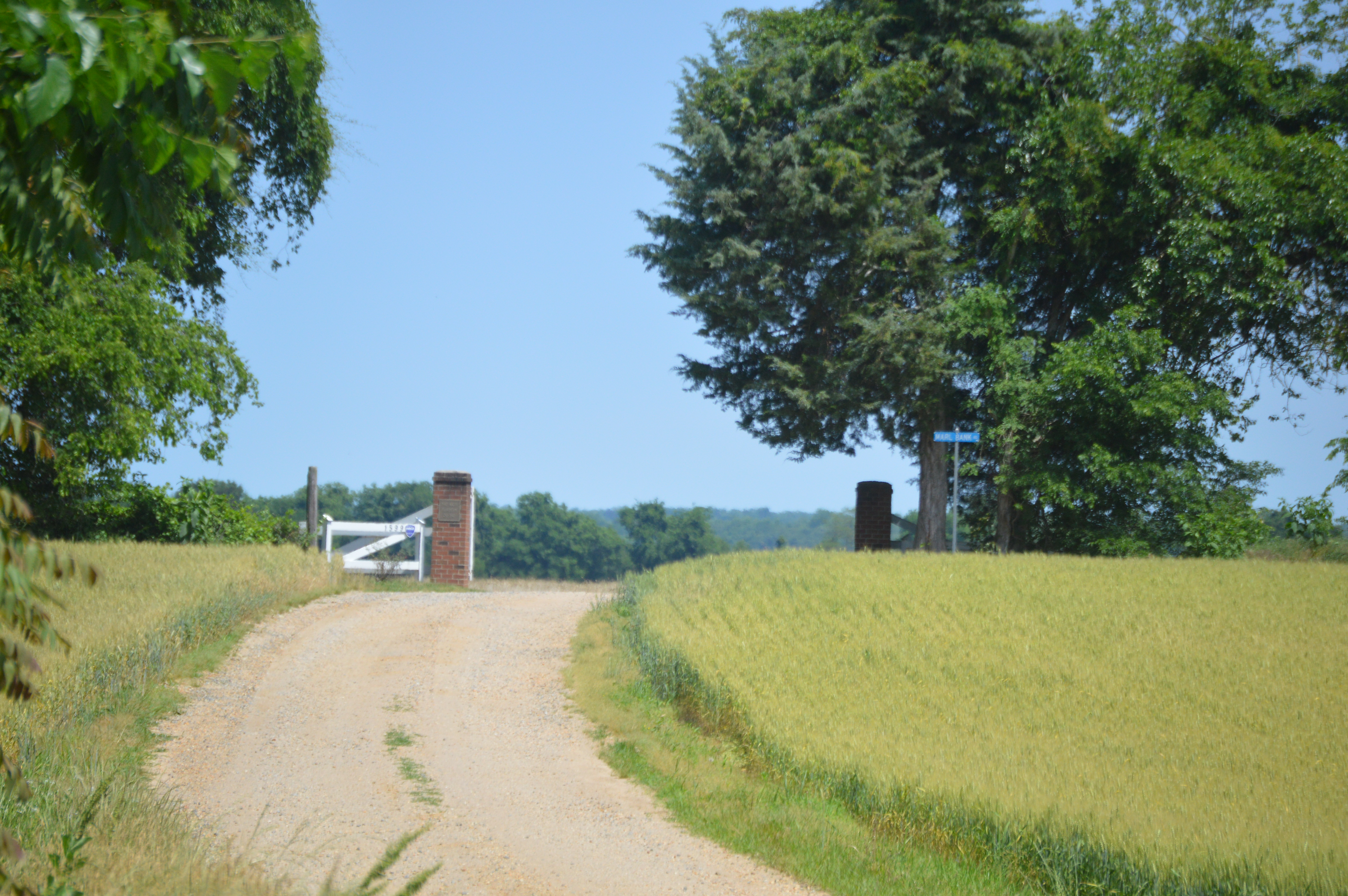
- Property entrance

- Location within Virginia Location within the United States
- Location: VA 674, at Rappahannock R., near Loretto, Virginia
- Coordinates: 38°07′22″N 77°04′07″W
- Area: 102 acres (41 ha)
- Architectural style: Federal
- NRHP reference No.: 91002041
- VLR No.: 028-0274

Significant dates
- Added to NRHP: February 6, 1992
- Designated VLR: June 19, 1991

Port Micou is a historic 18th and 19th trading center on the Rappahannock River near Loretto, Essex County, Virginia. There are two remaining buildings, both built between about 1825 and 1850. They are a large 1 1/2-story, wood-frame granary, and a 1 1/2-story, frame dwelling with a tall raised basement.

The complex was listed on the National Register of Historic Places in 1992.
