= Brooke's Bank =

Historic house in Virginia, United States

- U.S. National Register of Historic Places
- Virginia Landmarks Register
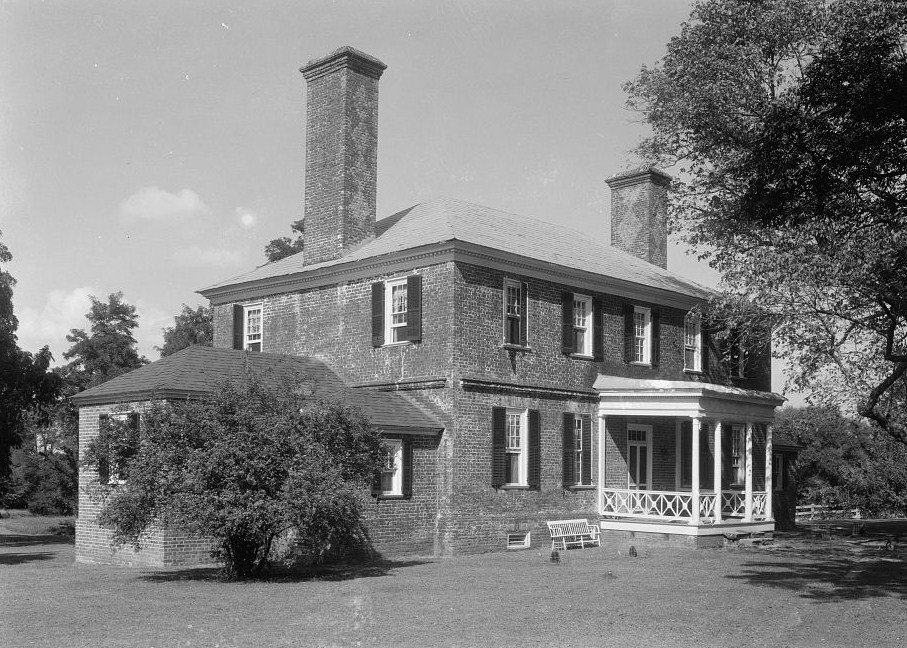
- Brooke's Bank, HABS Photo

- Location within Virginia Location within the United States
- Location: 1 mi. E of Loretto, 1.4 mi. N of VA 17, near Loretto, Virginia
- Coordinates: 38°05′11″N 77°01′13″W
- Area: 435 acres (176 ha)
- Built: 1751
- Architectural style: Colonial, Georgian
- NRHP reference No.: 71000976
- VLR No.: 028-0007

Significant dates
- Added to NRHP: September 28, 1971
- Designated VLR: June 1, 1971

Brooke's Bank is a historic plantation house located near Loretto, Essex County, Virginia. It was built in 1751, and is a two-story, five-bay, brick dwelling with a hipped roof in the Georgian style. It has two 20th-century one-story brick wings. The original interior woodwork of Brooke's Bank survives almost completely intact. During the American Civil War, it was shelled by the USS Parmee, a Union gunboat on the Rappahannock River.

It was listed on the National Register of Historic Places in 1971.
