= Glebe House of St. Anne's Parish =

- U.S. National Register of Historic Places
- Virginia Landmarks Register
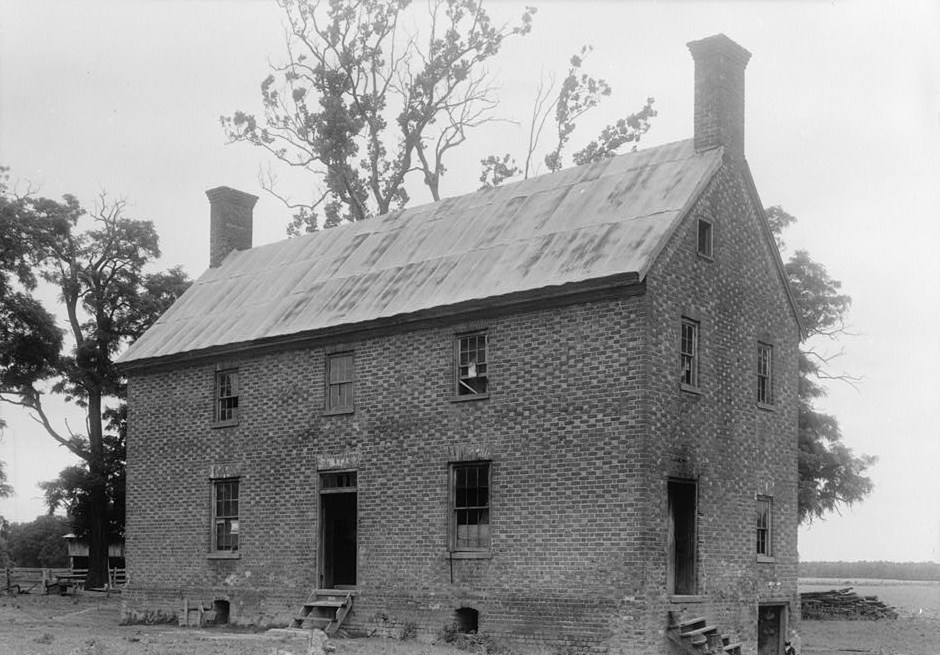
- St. Anne's Parish Glebe House, HABS Photo

- Location within Virginia Location within the United States
- Location: 2.5 mi. NE of Champlain on N bank of Farmers Hall Creek, near Champlain, Virginia
- Coordinates: 38°01′27.6″N 76°58′03.6″W
- Area: 635 acres (257 ha)
- Architectural style: Colonial
- NRHP reference No.: 75002020
- VLR No.: 028-0014

Significant dates
- Added to NRHP: March 3, 1975
- Designated VLR: November 19, 1974

Glebe House of St. Anne's Parish is a historic Episcopal glebe house located near Champlain, Essex County, Virginia. It was built about 1730, and is a two-story, three-bay, brick building with a gable roof. It measures about 50 feet long by 20 feet wide and features interior end chimneys.

It was listed on the National Register of Historic Places in 1975.
