= Chance, Virginia =

Unincorporated community in Virginia, United States

- Unincorporated community
- Location within Virginia Location within the United States
- Coordinates: 38°03′25″N 77°00′30″W
- Country: United States
- State: Virginia
- County: Essex
- Elevation: 69 ft (21 m)
- Time zone: UTC-5 (Eastern (EST))
  - Summer (DST): UTC-4 (EDT)
- Area code: 804
- GNIS feature ID: 1495374

Chance is an unincorporated community in Essex County, in the U.S. state of Virginia.

Glencairn was listed on the National Register of Historic Places in 1979.
