= Dunbrooke, Virginia =

Unincorporated community in Virginia, United States

- Unincorporated community
- Location within Virginia Location within the United States
- Coordinates: 37°53′39″N 76°57′50″W
- Country: United States
- State: Virginia
- County: Essex
- Elevation: 157 ft (48 m)
- Time zone: UTC-5 (Eastern (EST))
  - Summer (DST): UTC-4 (EDT)
- Area code: 804
- GNIS feature ID: 1495482

Dunbrooke is an unincorporated community in Essex County, in the U.S. state of Virginia. It was named for the postmasters in the 1800s Robert Dunn and Sarah Elizabeth Brooks. The community's former name was Piscataway.

Cherry Walk was listed on the National Register of Historic Places in 1983.
