= Miller's Tavern, Virginia =

Unincorporated community in Virginia, United States

- Unincorporated community
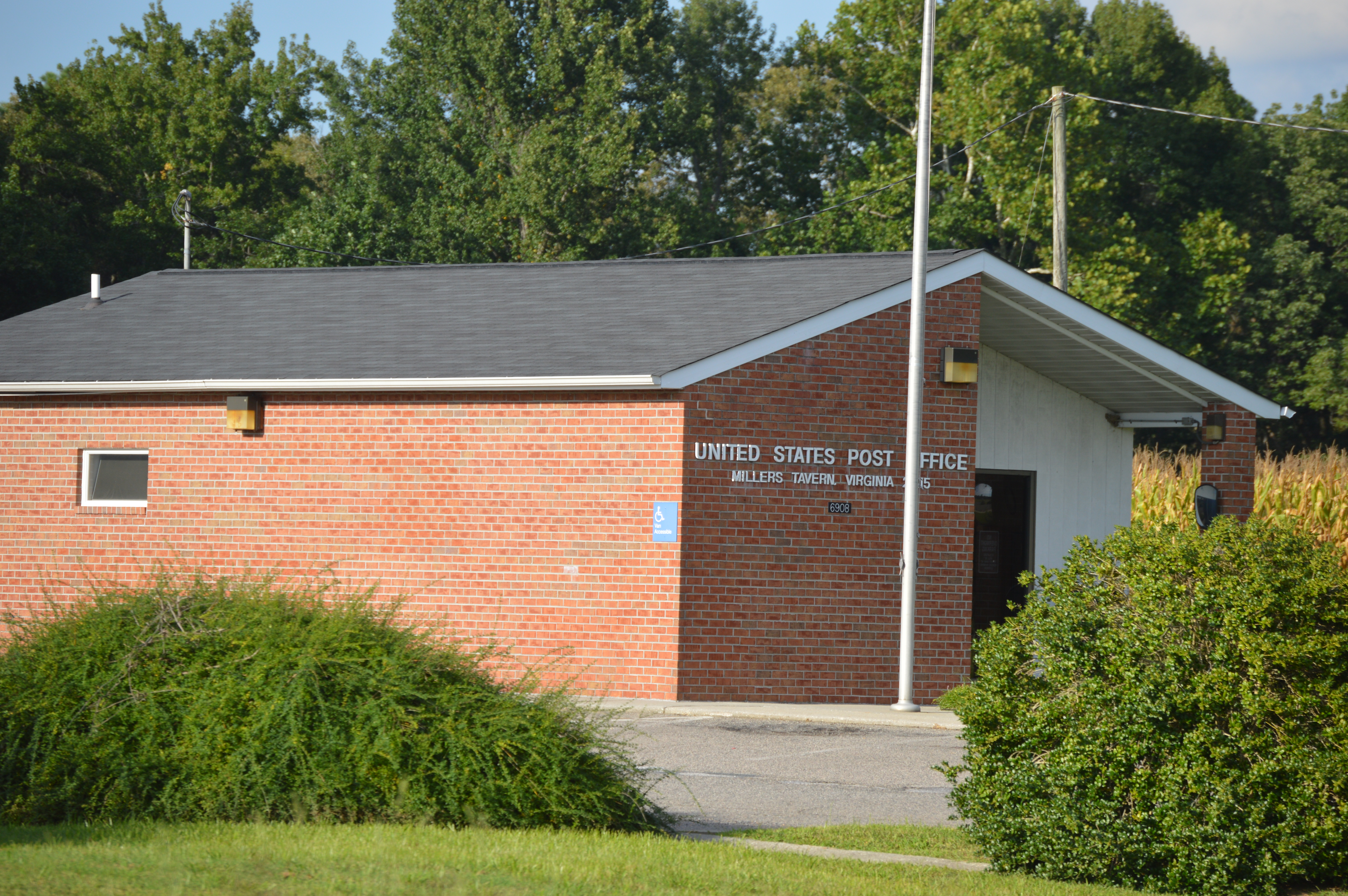
- Post office

- Location within Virginia Location within the United States
- Coordinates: 37°49′42″N 76°56′42″W
- Country: United States
- State: Virginia
- Counties: Essex and King and Queen
- Elevation: 184 ft (56 m)
- Time zone: UTC-5 (Eastern (EST))
  - Summer (DST): UTC-4 (EDT)
- ZIP code: 23115
- Area code: 804
- GNIS feature ID: 1470571

Miller's Tavern, Virginia (often Millers Tavern) is a small community located on the border of Essex County and King and Queen County, Virginia, United States.

The community is located at the junction of U.S. Route 360 with Routes 620 and 684.

The ZIP code for the community is 23115.

Watt's Supermarket is a landmark in the community.

Woodlawn was listed on the National Register of Historic Places in 1980.
