= Reveley =

Reveley is a surname. Notable people with the surname include:

- Demelza Reveley (born 1991), Australian model who won the fourth cycle of Australia's Next Top Model
- Eustace Reveley Mitford (1810–1869), satirical writer, best known as "Pasquin" in the early days of the Colony of South Australia
- Henry Willey Reveley (1788–1875), civil engineer at the Swan River Colony, the foundation of the state of Western Australia
- James E. Reveley (1944-2023), mortician, dentist, and consumer advocate for the regulation of the American funeral industry.
- Maria Reveley (1770–1836), friend and correspondent of Mary and Percy Bysshe Shelley and William Godwin
- Mary Reveley (1940–2017), English racehorse trainer
- Willey Reveley (1760–1799), English architect
- W. Taylor Reveley II (1917–1992), 18th president of Hampden-Sydney College
- W. Taylor Reveley III (born 1943), 27th president of the College of William & Mary
- W. Taylor Reveley IV (born 1974), Virginia educator and lawyer, 26th president of Longwood University

== See also ==
- Revel (disambiguation)
