= List of deans of the William & Mary Law School =

Following is a list of deans of the William & Mary Law School, formally the Marshall-Wythe School of Law, which is the oldest extant law school in the United States, having been founded in 1779 at the urging of alumnus Thomas Jefferson.

The law school was closed from 1861 to 1921, when it was revived.

== 1779–1861 ==
Image	Name	Took office	Left office	Notes
	George Wythe	1779	1789	
	St. George Tucker	1790	1804	
	William Nelson	1804	1813	
	Robert Nelson	1813	1818	
	James Semple	1819	1834	
	Nathaniel Beverley Tucker	1834	1851	Longest-serving dean.
	George Parker Scarburgh	1852	1855	
	Lucian Minor	1855	1858	
	Charles Morris	1859	1861	

== 1923–Present ==
Image	Name	Took office	Left office	Notes
	John Garland Pollard	1923	1932	
	Theodore Sullivan Cox	1932	1942	
	Dudley W. Woodbridge	1942	1946	Acting Dean
	Theodore Sullivan Cox	1946	1947	
	Arthur Warren Phelps	1947	1948	
	Dudley W. Woodbridge	1948	1962	Acting Dean, 1948–1950
	Joseph Curtis	1962	1969	Acting Dean, 1962–1963
	James P. Whyte Jr.	1969	1975	Acting Dean, 1969–1970
	Emeric Fischer	1975	1976	Acting Dean
	William Spong Jr.	1976	1985	
	Timothy J. Sullivan	1985	1992	
	Richard A. Williamson	1992	1993	Acting Dean
	Paul Marcus	1993	1994	Acting Dean
	Thomas G. Krattenmaker	1994	1997	
	Paul Marcus	1997	1998	Acting Dean
	W. Taylor Reveley III	1998	2008	
	Lynda L. Butler	2008	2009	Interim Dean
	Davison M. Douglas	2009	2020	
	A. Benjamin Spencer	2020	present	
