= Jeff Schapiro =

American political commentator

- Born: Jeff Eric Schapiro; New York City, U.S.
- Education: Georgetown University (AB)
- Occupations: Political commentator; columnist; reporter
- Spouse: Clare Osdene (m. 1988)

Jeff Eric Schapiro is an American newspaper reporter and political commentator. A New York City native, he moved to Richmond, Virginia in 1979, shortly after graduating from Georgetown University, and covered politics and policy out of United Press International's news bureau there. One of the most prominent political journalists in the state, he has worked for the Richmond Times-Dispatch since 1987, where he currently writes a twice-weekly column, and he regularly appears on radio and television. In 2015, he was honored by Virginia Commonwealth University's Richard T. Robertson School of Media and Culture by being inducted into their Virginia Communications Hall of Fame. W. Taylor Reveley IV, the president of Longwood University, has called him "a giant in the field of journalism in the state."

Schapiro's wife, Clare Osdene Schapiro, is a food columnist for the Richmond Times-Dispatch. The couple were married in Richmond on September 17, 1988, by Virginia Supreme Court justice John Charles Thomas.
