= Christine Rossell =

American social scientist, academic, and author (born 1945)

Christine H. Rossell
- Occupations: Social scientist, academic, and author

Academic background
- Education: B.A., International Relations; M.A., Political Science; Ph.D., Political Science
- Alma mater: University of California, Los Angeles; California State University; University of Southern California

Christine H. Rossell is an American social scientist, academic, and author. She is a Professor Emerita of Political Science at Boston University.

Rossell's research interests are in American politics, public policy, and education policy analysis, with a focus on school desegregation and bilingual education. She is the author or editor of five books, including School Desegregation in the 21st Century, and Bilingual Education in Massachusetts: The Emperor Has No Clothes, and The Carrot or the Stick for School Desegregation Policy: Magnet Schools or Forced Busing.

== Education ==
Rossell received her B.A. in International Relations, with an area specialization in Latin America, from the University of California, Los Angeles in June 1967. She went on to pursue graduate studies in political science, earning her M.A. from California State University in 1969. In January 1974, she received her Ph.D. in political science from the University of Southern California.

== Career ==
Rossell joined Pitzer College as an assistant professor in 1973. In 1975, she joined the faculty at Boston University, where she remained until her retirement. She was promoted to associate professor in 1982, and to Professor of Political Science in 1989, when she held the Maxwell Chair in U.S. Citizenship and Chaired the Political Science Department from 1992 till 1995. She was conferred the title of Professor Emerita in 2018.

Rossell has been on advisory boards of READ, the Center for Equal Opportunity in Washington, D.C., and the United States Commission on Civil Rights study on school desegregation.

== Research ==
Best known for her work on school desegregation and bilingual education policy, Rossell has authored numerous peer-reviewed articles and technical reports. She has made research contributions to the areas of public policy, public policy analysis, American politics, and education policy.

=== School desegregation and bilingual education policy ===
In collaboration with Keith Baker, Rossell conducted an analysis of how language learning affects students' academic performance, as well as their overall development, providing recommendations for the best ways to incorporate various types of bilingual education programs in educational settings. In related research, her work with Baker established that transitional bilingual education is not a superior form of instruction for limited English proficient children. While reviewing the Federal Bilingual Education Program, she also emphasized that the federal government demonstrates a persistent and enthusiastic approach in advocating and endorsing this particular form of educational program, despite the lack of rigorous research evidence supporting it. In particular, she argued that structured immersion is the most effective method for educating second language learners, and recommended limiting the time students spend in this type of program to one or two years.

In her research on school desegregation, Rossell noted that various approaches, including busing programs, and magnet schools have been used to promote school integration. Early in her career, she examined the causes and consequences of white flight from schools and the effects of school desegregation policies on it. She concluded that the mandatory desegregation (also known as forced busing) plans she once supported, produced so much white flight that within a few years of implementation of a plan there was less interracial exposure than before the plan was implemented. Later, she examined the efficacy of voluntary desegregation plans in schools and found that their success is largely dependent on the willingness of parents to alter their decisions about their children's school attendance, but they nevertheless produced less white flight and more interracial exposure than mandatory reassignment plans

Rossell's research also analyzed the effectiveness of magnet schools in terms of integrating students from diverse backgrounds, offered guidelines for designing new magnet schools for maximum effectiveness, and highlighted factors that increase the chances of success, including support services and a positive school environment. Additionally, she collaborated with David J. Armor on a 600-school district study that assessed the effectiveness of different kinds of voluntary and mandatory reassignment approaches to school desegregation, comparing their implementation in different regions of the U.S. to identify the most effective approach. While acknowledging the benefits of magnet schools in enhancing school desegregation and providing access to quality education, she has also examined the evidence against them, including increased socioeconomic segregation and funding disparities. Despite these challenges, she proposed additional strategies to improve the effectiveness of magnet schools, emphasizing the need for ongoing improvement in education.

=== Public policy ===
Rossell has contributed to public policy through multiple reports, including technical reports for court cases, government agencies, and public policy organizations. Notably, she authored a report for the U.S. National Institute of Education in Washington, D.C., in 1978, which presented an evaluation of the unintended consequences of public policies on school desegregation and resegregation. She also proposed an assessment framework for school desegregation policies, considering factors such as equity, efficiency, and effectiveness, alongside other prominent works and research.

Rossell's book, The Carrot or the Stick for Desegregation Policy: Magnet Schools or Forced Busing compares the efficacy of voluntary desegregation plans with mandatory reassignment and finds that voluntary plans with incentives (magnets) result in greater interracial exposure. In his book review, David Armor praised the information regarding desegregation plans, stating that "the book is primarily intended for educators, lawyers, jurists, and social scientists who are involved in designing or evaluating school desegregation remedies." Daniel J. Monti, on the other hand, criticized this book of hers for lacking a moral tone and instead functioning more as a guide for achieving financial stability through whitewashing. He added that "Although the book is intended to be read as advancing the science of desegregation...it is far more useful as a study in the politics of desegregation and, more broadly, of moral reform movements."

Betty W. Nyangoni reviewed The Consequences of School Desegregation co-edited by Rossell and Willis D. Hawley, praised it for its contribution to the literature with its content, readability, and research findings, and commented that “It would be of special interest to educational researchers, policy makers, teachers, students of school desegregation…” Henry Levin commended the book for its outstanding index and bibliography, describing it as “the most comprehensive work on the subject,” and described that “the volume will be an invaluable resource to those who address both research and policy issues in the area of school de- segregation.”

== Awards and honors ==
- 1998 – Listed in Jeffrey Raffel's Historical Dictionary of School Segregation and Desegregation: The American Experience as one of only 51 individuals listed as influential in school desegregation
- 2017 – Albert Nelson Marquis Lifetime Achievement Award

== Bibliography ==
=== Books ===
- Strategies for Effective Desegregation (1983)
- The Consequences of School Desegregation (1983) ISBN 978-0877223207
- The Carrot or the Stick for School Desegregation Policy: Magnet Schools vs. Forced Busing (1990) ISBN 978-0877229247
- Bilingual Education in Massachusetts: The Emperor Has No Clothes (1996) ISBN 978-0929930145
- School Desegregation in the 21st Century (2002) ISBN 978-0275977696

=== Selected articles ===
- Rossell, C. H. (1975). School desegregation and white flight. Political Science Quarterly, 90(4), 675–695.
- Rossell, C. H. (1985). What is attractive about magnet schools?. Urban Education, 20(1), 7–22.
- Rossell, C. H. (1990). The carrot or the stick for school desegregation policy?. Urban Affairs Quarterly, 25(3), 474–499.
- Rossell, C. H., & Baker, K. (1996). The educational effectiveness of bilingual education. Research in the Teaching of English, 7–74.
- Rossell, C. H., & Armor, D. J. (1996). The effectiveness of school desegregation plans, 1968–1991. American Politics Quarterly, 24(3), 267–302.
