= Timothy J. Sullivan =

American lawyer

25th President of the College of William & Mary
- In office April 9, 1992 – June 30, 2005
- Preceded by: Paul R. Verkuil
- Succeeded by: Gene Nichol

18th Dean of William & Mary Law School
- In office 1985–1992
- Preceded by: William B. Spong Jr.
- Succeeded by: Thomas G. Krattenmaker

Personal details
- Born: April 15, 1944 (age 82) Ravenna, Ohio, United States
- Spouse: Anne Klare Sullivan
- Education: College of William & Mary (B.A. 1966); Harvard School of Law (J.D. 1969)
- Profession: Educator

Timothy Jackson Sullivan (born April 15, 1944) is an American attorney, legal scholar, and academic administrator who served as the twenty-fifth president of the College of William and Mary. Sullivan's thirteen-year administration was marked by a sustained emphasis on the quality of undergraduate education. During the budget shortfalls of the late 1990s and early 2000s, Sullivan transferred resources from other institutional priorities to protect class sizes and academic standards. As spokesperson for Virginia's state-supported colleges and universities, he became an outspoken advocate for increased state education funding.

A William & Mary alumnus, he previously served as dean of its Marshall-Wythe School of Law from 1985 to 1992. After his presidency, he served as president and CEO of the Mariners' Museum and Park in Newport News, Virginia, from 2006 to 2009.

Sullivan has received various honors for his contributions to higher education. In 1992, Sullivan was given the Freedom of the Drapers' Company in London, and was installed as a member of the Livery in July 2003. In 1993, he received an honorary Doctor of Laws (LLD) from the University of Aberdeen.

== Early life and education ==
Sullivan was born on April 15, 1944, and grew up in Ravenna, Ohio. His maternal grandfather was Judge Albert L. Caris. Before graduating from Ravenna High School in 1962, he served as president of the student council and vice-president of his senior class, co-edited the school newspaper, and was a member of the National Honor Society.

Sullivan entered the College of William and Mary as a freshman in 1962 and graduated in 1966 with a B.A. in Government. He was elected to Phi Beta Kappa and to Omicron Delta Kappa, a second national academic honor society.

Sullivan received his Juris Doctor from Harvard Law School in 1969.

== Military service ==
Following law school, Sullivan served in the United States Army Signal Corps during the Vietnam War. He received the Army Commendation Medal with First Oak Leaf Cluster and the Bronze Star Medal for his service.

== Academic career ==
=== Marshall-Wythe School of Law ===
Sullivan returned to William & Mary in 1972 as an assistant professor at the Marshall-Wythe School of Law, specializing in contract law. He was promoted to associate professor in 1974, and to full professor and associate dean in 1977. In 1981 and 1982, he served as a visiting law professor at the University of Virginia School of Law. From approximately 1981 to 1984, Sullivan left the law school to serve for nearly three years as executive assistant for policy to Charles S. Robb, then Governor of Virginia. He returned to Marshall-Wythe in 1984 as the John Stewart Bryan Professor of Jurisprudence. Sullivan also served as executive director of the Institute of Bill of Rights Law at William & Mary's law school. Sullivan became dean of the Marshall-Wythe School of Law in July 1985, a position he held until 1992. During his deanship, the law school rose in national rankings, drawing favorable recognition from Virginia educators and state legislators.

=== Presidency of William & Mary ===
On April 9, 1991, the Board of Visitors at William& Mary chose Sullivan to be the college's twenty-fifth president. He was sworn in as president on June 1, 1992—just eight months before the university's 300th anniversary celebration. Sullivan served as chair of the Council of Presidents of Virginia's state-supported colleges and universities for 1998 and 1999, and as chair of the Governing Board of the Virginia Council of University Presidents.

He was succeeded on July 1, 2005 by Gene Nichol, former dean of the law school at the University of North Carolina at Chapel Hill, who had previously served on Sullivan's faculty at William & Mary.

=== The Mariners' Museum and Park ===
On November 1, 2006, Sullivan was appointed president and CEO of The Mariners' Museum and Park in Newport News, Virginia, a position he held until 2009. During his tenure, he conceived of and helped broker the relocation of the Mariners' Museum Library to a new facility on the campus of Christopher Newport University, where it was integrated with the university's Trible Library—a public-private partnership that expanded researcher access to the museum's maritime collection and the USS Monitor archival records.

== Public service and civic roles ==
Sullivan held a series of senior public-service appointments in Virginia. He served as executive director of the Governor's Commission on Virginia's Future, counsel for the Commission on the Future of the Virginia Judicial System, and as a member of the Virginia Board of Education. He was appointed by Governor L. Douglas Wilder as chair of the Governor's Task Force on Intercollegiate and Interscholastic Athletics, and served on the Governor's Task Force on Substance Abuse and Sexual Assault on Campus. He also served on the Virginia Rhodes Scholarship Committee and on the Education Advisory Panel of the Association of Governing Boards of Universities and Colleges. Sullivan served on the Board of Governors of the National Portrait Gallery of the Smithsonian Institution in Washington, D.C.

Sullivan is a member of the Virginia State Bar and the Ohio State Bar, and a Fellow of both the Virginia Bar Foundation and the American Bar Foundation. Sullivan is inducted into the Ravenna City Schools Hall of Fame.

== Personal life ==
His future wife, Anne Doubet Klare, was a fellow member of the class of 1966; the two were later married in the chapel of the Sir Christopher Wren Building at William & Mary.

Academic offices
Preceded by William B. Spong, Jr.	Dean of the College of William & Mary Law School; 1985 – 1992	Succeeded by Thomas G. Krattenmaker
