= Gene Nichol =

American lawyer and educator (born 1951)

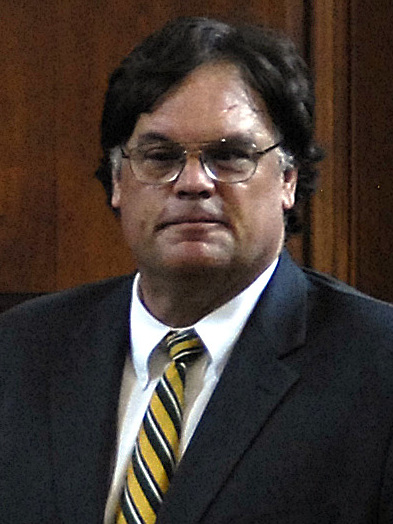
- Nichol in 2007

26th President of the College of William & Mary
- In office July 1, 2005 – February 12, 2008
- Preceded by: Timothy J. Sullivan
- Succeeded by: W. Taylor Reveley III

12th Dean of the University of Colorado School of Law
- In office 1988–1995
- Preceded by: Betsy Levin
- Succeeded by: Harold H. Bruff

Personal details
- Born: May 11, 1951 (age 75) Dallas, Texas, U.S.
- Spouse: Glenn George
- Education: Oklahoma State University (BA); University of Texas at Austin (JD)
- Profession: Educator

Gene Ray Nichol, Jr. (born May 11, 1951) is an American lawyer and educator who served as the twenty-sixth president of the College of William & Mary in Williamsburg, Virginia, United States. He succeeded Timothy J. Sullivan and officially served from July 1, 2005, to February 12, 2008. It was the shortest tenure for a William & Mary president since the Civil War. During each year of his presidency, however, the college continued to break its own application records.

== Early life and career ==
Nichol spent his prep years at Bishop Lynch High School in Dallas, Texas (Class of 1969). He then attended Oklahoma State University (Class of 1973), where he received a philosophy degree and participated on the varsity football team. He received his Juris Doctor from the University of Texas (Class of 1976), graduating Order of the Coif. He then became the dean of the University of Colorado School of Law from 1988 to 1995, as well as dean of the University of North Carolina at Chapel Hill School of Law from 1999 to 2005.

He previously worked at William & Mary as Cutler Professor of Constitutional Law and director of the Institute of Bill of Rights Law from 1985 to 1988. His other positions have included teaching law in the undergraduate and law schools of the University of Colorado, the University of Florida, the University of Exeter, the University of Oxford, and West Virginia University.

Nichol made a bid for the United States Senate representing the state of Colorado in 1996 with the Democratic Party, but was defeated in the primary. He also made a bid for the U.S. House of Representatives in 1998 and was defeated in a 4-way primary by Mark Udall.

== Athletic logo and the NCAA ==
As president of The College of William & Mary, Nichol was forced by the NCAA to drop the college's feathers from its logo after a lengthy appeals process. The college was allowed to retain the team name of "Tribe." While several schools, including the University of North Dakota and the University of Illinois have been forced to abandon their mascots, others, such as the University of Utah and Florida State University, who have standing relationships and friendly histories with the tribes represented by their mascots, were allowed to keep their Native American-based logos. The college administration disputed the NCAA decision, but ultimately agreed to the restrictions.

== Gateway William & Mary program ==
One of the first initiatives Gene Nichol undertook as president was the "Gateway William & Mary" program. "Designed for women and men whose academic promise exceeds their economic means, the [financial-aid] program . . . provide[s] a combination of institutional, state and federal grants for low- and middle-income students who have the desire to attend a world-class university without incurring debt."

== Wren Cross controversy ==
Nichol's October 2006 decision to change a long-standing university policy by removing a cross from permanent display on the altar of the Chapel in the Wren Building ended his first year as president in controversy. He explained that a cross in the chapel of a public university made some students of other religious traditions feel unwelcome in a place considered by the community to be an important part of campus.

Under the new policy, the cross would be displayed only in the chapel during Christian religious services, or upon request, in an effort to make the space more welcoming to groups of mixed faith. After complaints were made, Nichol amended the policy so that the cross would be displayed on Sundays, and other Christian days of observance.

Nichol became the target of criticism from a number of alumni, students, and benefactors for changing this policy. Nichol stated that he had received "several complaints," from students and parents because the college frequently holds student organization meetings in the chapel.

Due to this decision, alumnus James McGlothlin revoked $12 million he had planned on giving to the college's capital campaign.

Stories had surfaced that Nichol knew of the revoked donation before he announced that the Fund for William and Mary met its $500 million fundraising goal. McGlothlin's rescinding of the pledge pushed the fundraising back under $500 million, and he had revealed to former President Timothy J. Sullivan in an e-mail that he would take back the pledge. In response, Sullivan wrote:

I would like to make it clear to everyone in the William & Mary community that since I left the College everything I have learned which might assist the College or protect her from harm has been communicated to the College administration verbally or by e-mail.

— Timothy J. Sullivan

Nichol denied knowing about the revoked pledge before the announcement that the fundraising goal had been reached. The college initially refused to release the e-mail between Nichol and Sullivan, but capitulated to several FOIA requests. The e-mail read:

Dear Nick,

Greetings from London where we are having a great holiday. I hope things are well with you, Glenn and the girls. I need to tell you about a recent communication from Jim McGlothlin. As you know I have been working hard with Taylor toward a 12 Million dollar gift from Jim to the Law School. I felt that we were making good progress and moving toward closure, but I talked to Jim who is very upset and angry about the Wren cross, and is not prepared to give any more money at this time because he is so upset about the removal of the cross from the Chapel. I am not sure that I can do anything more to help you with Jim. He is very angry. I have said from the time that you became president that I would help you with anything that you needed, and I was prepared to talk about anything with you. We have not spoken (absolutely you're right) but I could have told you where this decision would go. I will do anything that you can think of that would help you at this time — but I have to say that I am so sorry that William and Mary has come to this place.

Best,
Tim

After months of controversy, which saw conservative commentators and national conservative political figures speak against the decision, Nichol established a presidential committee to explore the issue. Comprising students, faculty, staff, and alumni, the committee was charged with examining the "role of religion in a public university" in general, and at William & Mary in particular. The committee focused its efforts toward resolving the Wren Cross controversy.

On March 6, 2007, William & Mary announced that the committee had recommended that the cross be returned to Wren Chapel as an artifact displayed in a glass case, with a plaque explaining the college's Anglican heritage and historical connection to Bruton Parish Church. Nichol and the Board of Visitors agreed to the recommendation in a press conference. In addition, the chapel sacristy would continue to be available to store religious symbols of any faith, which may be brought into the chapel as appropriate.

== Sex Workers' Art Show controversy ==
Additional controversy followed Nichol after allowing the Sex Workers' Art Show to proceed to campus on February 4, 2008. The tour visited college campuses and other venues across the country. While personally expressing his displeasure with the content of the student-funded show, Nichol felt censoring the performance would be inappropriate. He issued a statement saying, "The First Amendment and the defining traditions of openness that sustain universities are hallmarks of academic inquiry and freedom. It is the speech we disdain that often puts these principles to the test. The College of William & Mary will not knowingly and intentionally violate the constitutional rights of its students. Censorship has no place at a great university." Nichol's allowance of the Sex Workers' Art Show to perform on the campus garnered mixed reactions among both the general public and the college student body.

=== Public reaction ===
Local and state levels of government officials, though not directly affected by the decision, spoke against it. Delegate Brenda L. Pogge (R – Yorktown) feared that the college, as a state symbol, may have "tarnished its legacy." Pogge mailed Nichol a letter that asked him to stop the show. She also requested a city police presence to determine if a state obscenity statute was broken.

Statewide, the Virginia House of Delegates (specifically the Privileges and Elections Committee) effectively "threatened" the Board of Visitors' appointees if they refused to fire Nichol over the surrounding controversies during his tenure, culminating with the Sex Workers' Art Show. Nichol's permission to allow a cabaret-style burlesque show on campus also offended many of the college's more conservative alumni, which resulted in some loss of endowment.

=== Student body reaction ===
The students at the College of William & Mary showed little opposition to the show. The Art Show's first appearance on campus in 2005 received little media attention, but the second visit in 2006 generated more interest from the students for the following year. Students who opposed the show's content often accepted its arrival on campus due to their support for freedom of speech. The tour performed two shows at William & Mary in 2008, both of which sold out quickly.

== Resignation ==
After the Board of Visitors decided not to renew his three-year contract, which was already set to expire on June 30, 2008, Nichol resigned on February 12. Several weeks after his resignation he returned to teach at the University of North Carolina School of Law. Matt Marvin, a UNC Law School spokesperson, said that all of the controversy surrounding Nichol did not alarm them and that they welcomed him back to the university.

In his resignation letter, Nichol claimed that the Board of Visitors had offered him money to stay silent on the reason he was fired, freedom of speech. He also claimed members of the Board of Visitors had been threatened by legislators if they did not order his resignation, and that the Virginia government was unhappy with his efforts to diversify the student body and faculty. Nichol claimed that he was offered "substantial economic incentives" to not mention this as well. The Board of Visitors denied these claims. W. Taylor Reveley, III, then dean of the law school, was named as the interim president of the college after Nichol's resignation. On September 5, 2008, Reveley officially succeeded Nichol as president when he was hired for a full three-year term.

Academic offices
Preceded by Betsy Levin	12th Dean of University of Colorado School of Law; 1988–1995	Succeeded by Harold H. Bruff
Preceded by Judith Welch Wegner	Dean of University of North Carolina School of Law; 1999–2005	Succeeded by John Charles Boger
