= The Rotunda (Longwood University) =

Building in Farmville, Virginia, United States

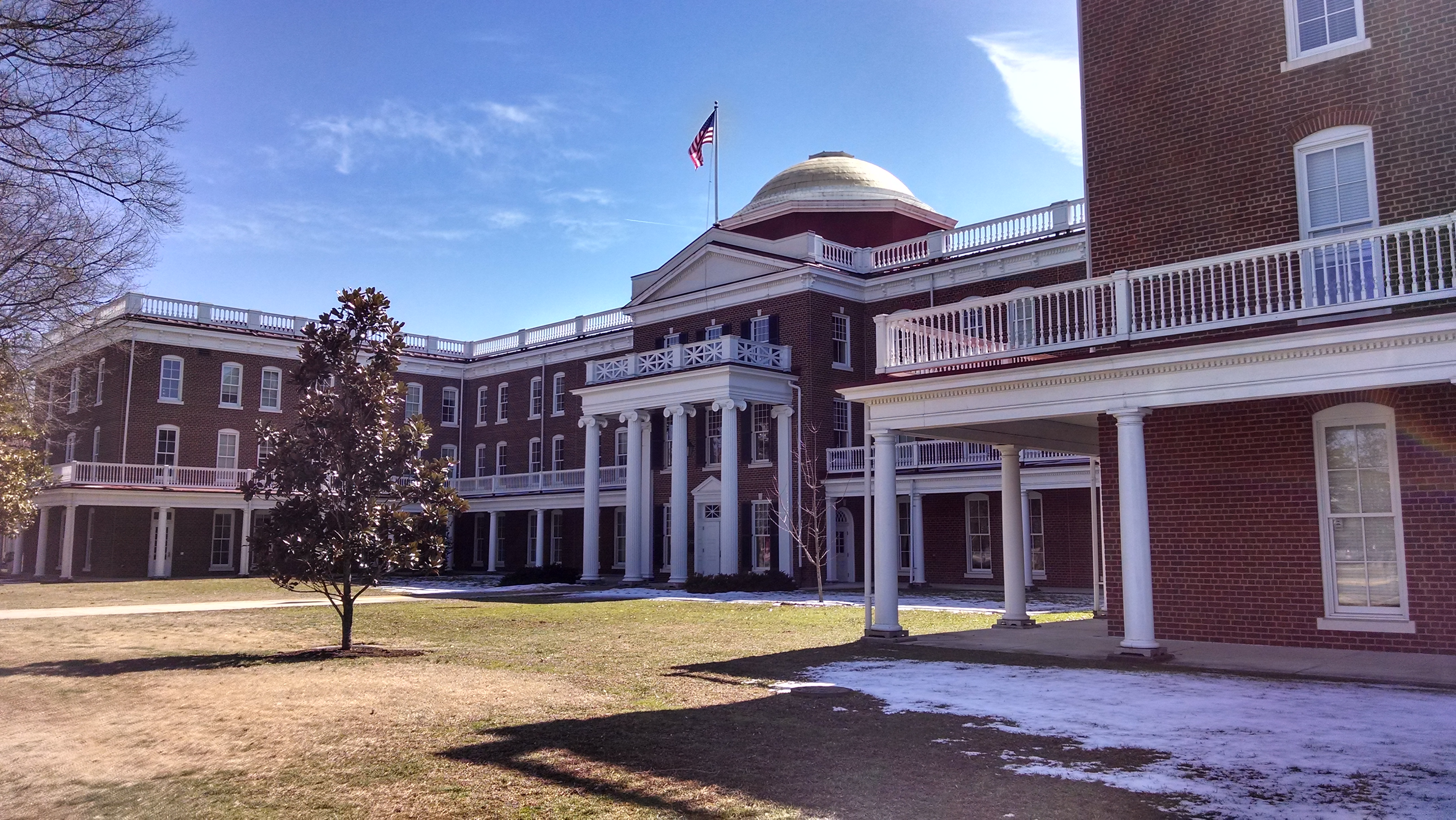
- The exterior of The Rotunda in March 2014

- Location within Virginia
- Former names: College Building, Ruffner Hall

General information
- Architectural style: Jeffersonian
- Location: 201 High Street, Farmville, Virginia, United States
- Coordinates: 37°18′4.25″N 78°23′45″W
- Current tenants: Longwood University
- Groundbreaking: December 12, 2002 (reconstruction)
- Construction started: 1839 (original)
- Completed: 1907 (original)
- Opened: April 23, 2005 (reconstruction)
- Destroyed: April 24, 2001 (original)
- Cost: $17.9 million ($29.5 million in 2025 dollars)
- Owner: Longwood University

Technical details
- Floor area: 83,143 sq ft (7,724.2 m^{2})

Design and construction
- Architecture firm: Kuntz & Associates of Alexandria (reconstruction)
- Main contractor: English Construction Company of Lynchburg (reconstruction)

The Rotunda is the name given to a building on the campus of Longwood University in Farmville, Virginia. It was formerly known as Ruffner Hall, but the name was changed in 2019. The original Rotunda was built in 1839 and gradually expanded along with the school over several decades, to eventually include its iconic rotunda dome, until its completion in 1907. The building was eventually destroyed in a fire on April 24, 2001. The then-Longwood College began to rebuild the structure, and it was reopened just before the fourth anniversary of the fire, on April 23, 2005. The new Rotunda, in contrast to the old, has a basement to increase instructional space.

== History ==
Historically, the Rotunda was the college campus, prior to the school expanding west and south in the mid-twentieth century, including serving as both residence hall and classrooms. In the closing days of the American Civil War, High Street and the then-Farmville Female College saw both Confederate forces escaping the Battle of Sailor's Creek towards Appomattox Court House, and the Union Army following them.

At the time of what became known as the "Great Fire of 2001," Ruffner Hall was undergoing an extensive renovation, and there were no people or historically significant artifacts in the building. The fire also severely damaged surrounding buildings, leading to the demolition and reconstruction of next-door Grainger Hall, and renovations of four dormitories.

One noted architectural feature is a slate front step at the front door of the building, which had an indentation worn into it from thousands of students walking across it over decades. Following the fire, the damaged step was located, and a replica was installed in the reconstructed Rotunda.

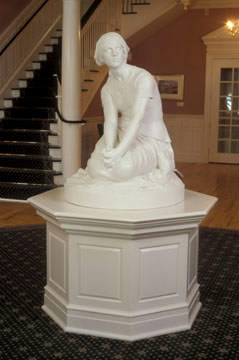
Jeanne d'Arc in 2005

== Art ==
The centerpiece of the Rotunda is a reproduction of a sculpture of Joan of Arc by Henri Chapu, titled Joan of Arc Listening to the Voices, but popularly known as "Joanie on the Stony." The Rotunda dome itself contains four lunettes as well as paintings of Thomas Jefferson, Horace Mann, William Henry Ruffner, and Jabez Lamar Monroe Curry.
