= Katherine Rowe =

First female president of William & Mary

Katherine A. Rowe
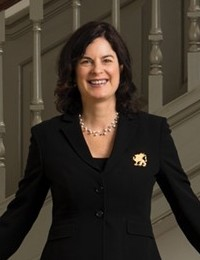
- Rowe in 2018

28th President of the College of William and Mary
- Incumbent
- Assumed office July 1, 2018
- Preceded by: W. Taylor Reveley III

Provost and Dean of Faculty at Smith College
- In office July 1, 2014 – June 30, 2018
- Preceded by: Marilyn Schuster
- Succeeded by: Joseph O'Rourke (acting)

Personal details
- Spouse: Bruce Jacobson
- Children: 2
- Education: Carleton College (BA); Harvard University (MA, PhD)
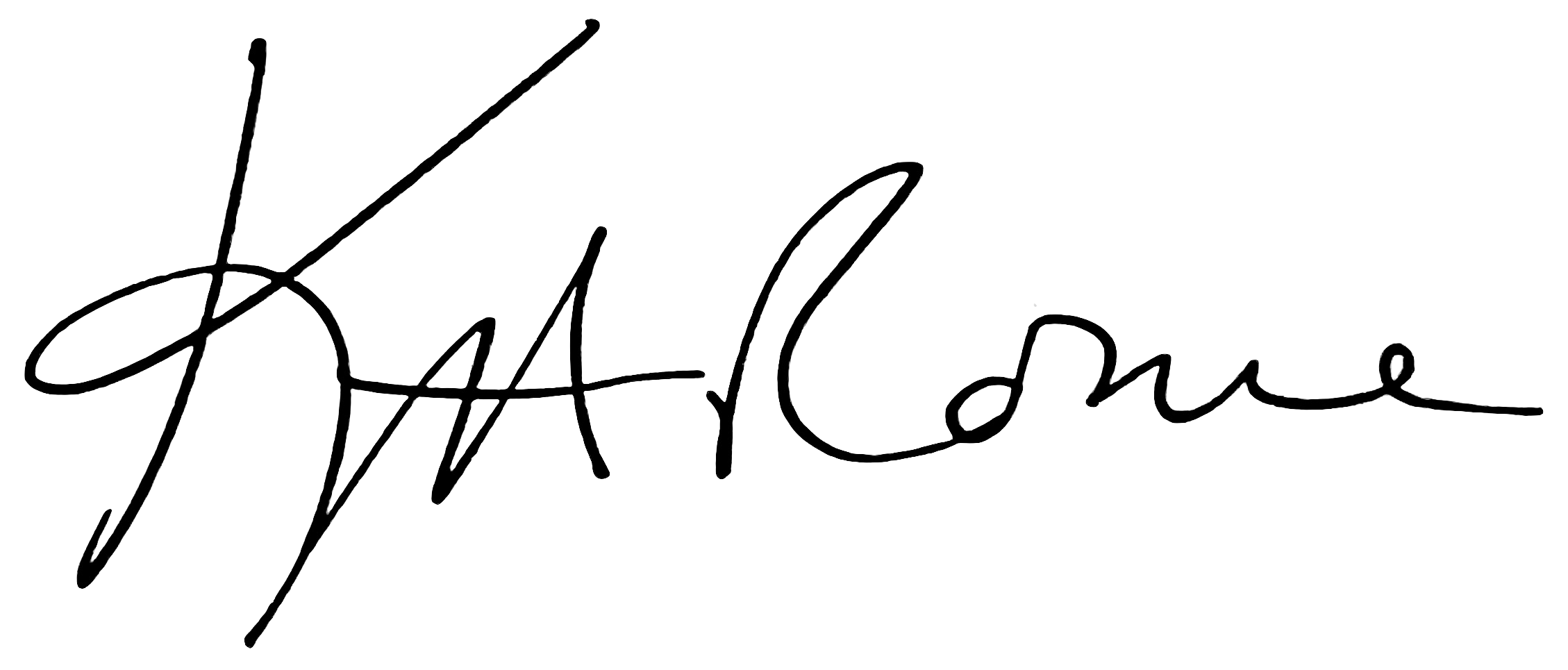
- Signature

Academic background
- Thesis: The Dead Hand: Fictions of Agency and the Physiology of Possession (1992)
- Doctoral advisor: Marjorie Garber

Academic work
- Discipline: English and American Literature
- Institutions: Yale University; Bryn Mawr College; Smith College; College of William and Mary

Katherine Anandi Rowe is an American scholar of Renaissance literature and media history. She was named the twenty-eighth president of the College of William & Mary on February 20, 2018. She began her service on July 2, 2018, succeeding W. Taylor Reveley III, who had served as president since 2008. Rowe is the first woman to be named president. After seven months in office, Rowe was formally inaugurated on February 8, 2019 as part of the university's annual Charter Day ceremony.

== Career ==
Rowe, a Shakespearean scholar, is recognized for her work in the digital innovation of the liberal arts. As the guest editor of the Shakespeare Quarterly's special issue on New Media, Rowe led the first open review of a traditional humanities journal on the web. The New York Times described the special issue as "trailblazing." In a 2020 special report, Diverse: Issues in Higher Education highlighted Rowe as one of 35 leading women in higher education.

Rowe served as provost and dean of the faculty of Smith College from 2014 to 2018. While at Smith, she served as the interim vice president for diversity, equity, and inclusion. In this role, Rowe is credited with transforming Smith's liberal arts curriculum and increasing diversity in faculty hiring. During her tenure as provost, Smith College developed "one of the first statistical and data sciences majors at a liberal arts college.” Rowe also oversaw the creation of Smith College's first Massive Open Online Course.

Rowe was an English professor at Yale University from 1992 to 1998 before moving to Bryn Mawr College, where she stayed from 1998 to 2014. She was the director for the Tri-College Digital Humanities Initiative, a coalition of faculty, students and staff from Bryn Mawr, Haverford and Swarthmore Colleges. Rowe directed the Mellon Tri-College Faculty Forum, a group supporting collaboration between the three colleges’ faculty members. She is also the co-founder and former chief executive officer of Luminary Digital Media, an organization that created reading apps for iPadOS in partnership with the Folger Shakespeare Library.

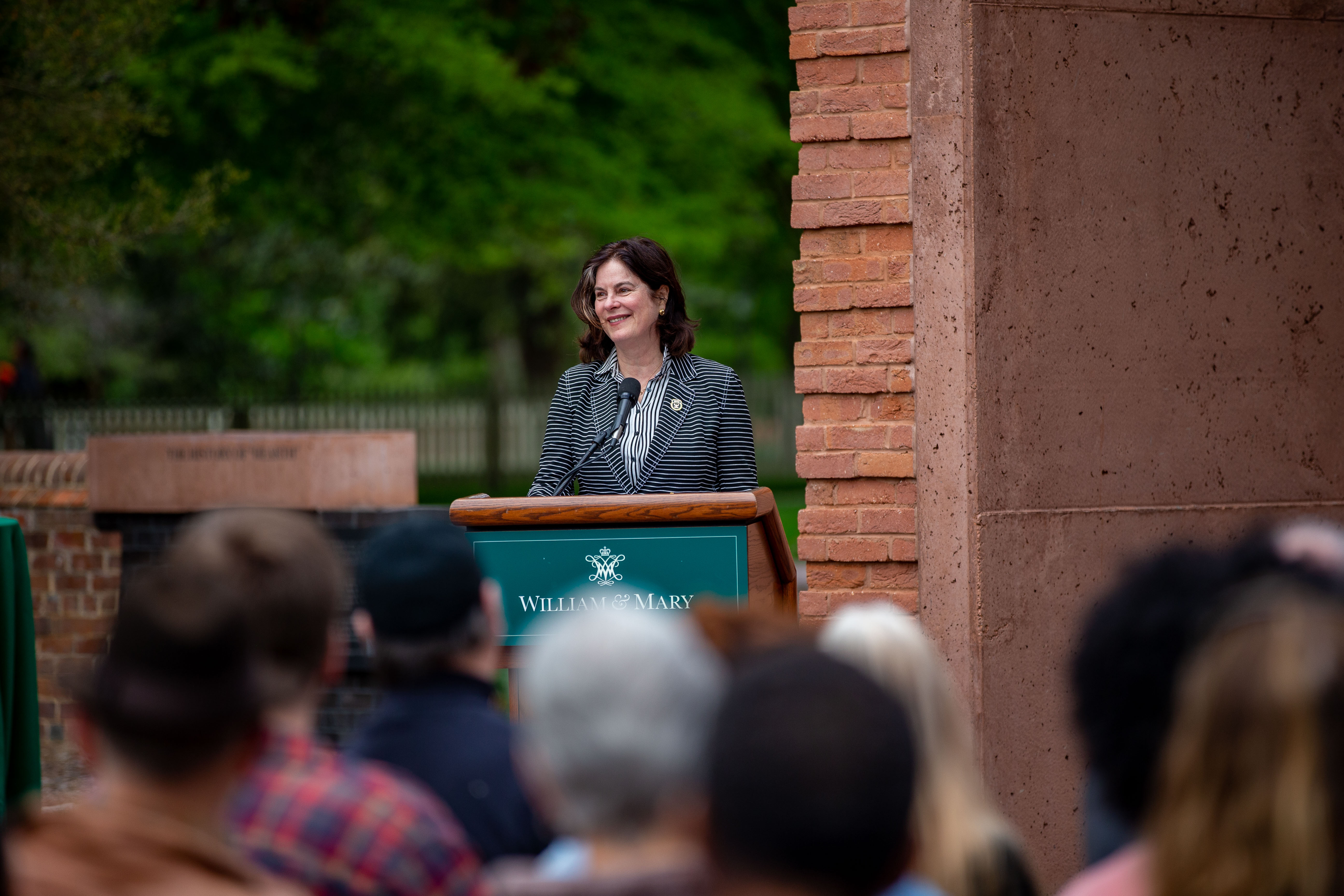
Rowe speaking in front of Hearth: Memorial to the Enslaved in 2023

Rowe and her husband Bruce Jacobson co-founded the nonprofit Boston Ultimate Disc Alliance. She also co-founded the Carleton College women's Ultimate team. Rowe was a World Ultimate Club Finalist and a Women's National Finalist. She has served as an Ultimate coach for more than a decade. Rowe met her husband, Jacobson, through Ultimate.

Rowe received a bachelor's degree in English and American literature from Carleton College in 1984. She earned a master's degree and a Ph.D. in English and American literature from Harvard University. Mid-career, Rowe completed graduate work in Cinema and Media Studies at New York University's Tisch School of the Arts. She has received of grants from the National Endowment for the Humanities, the Mellon Foundation, and the Pennsylvania Department of Education. Rowe also served as President of the Shakespeare Association of America and Associate General Editor of The Cambridge Guide to the Worlds of Cambridge. She also served on Harvard University's Board of Overseers’ Visiting Committee of the Library, and on the Executive Committee of the American Council of Learned Societies. Rowe has been a member of the Modern Language Association, International Shakespeare Association and the Society for Cinema and Media Studies. She was inducted into William & Mary's Omicron Delta Kappa—The National Leadership Honor Society—in 2018.

Rowe and Jacobson have two adult children.

== Selected works ==
- New Wave Shakespeare on Screen with Thomas Cartelli (Polity Press, 2007) ISBN 978-0745633923
- Reading the Early Modern Passions: Essays in the Cultural History of Emotion (Penn Press, 2004) ISBN 978-0812218725
- Dead Hands: Fictions of Agency, Renaissance to Modern (Stanford UP, 1999) ISBN 978-0804733854

Academic offices
Preceded by Marilyn Schuster	Dean of Smith College; 2014–2018	Succeeded by Joe O’Rourke (interim)
