= Henry C. Wolf Law Library =

Law library in Williamsburg, Virginia, US

The Wolf Law Library
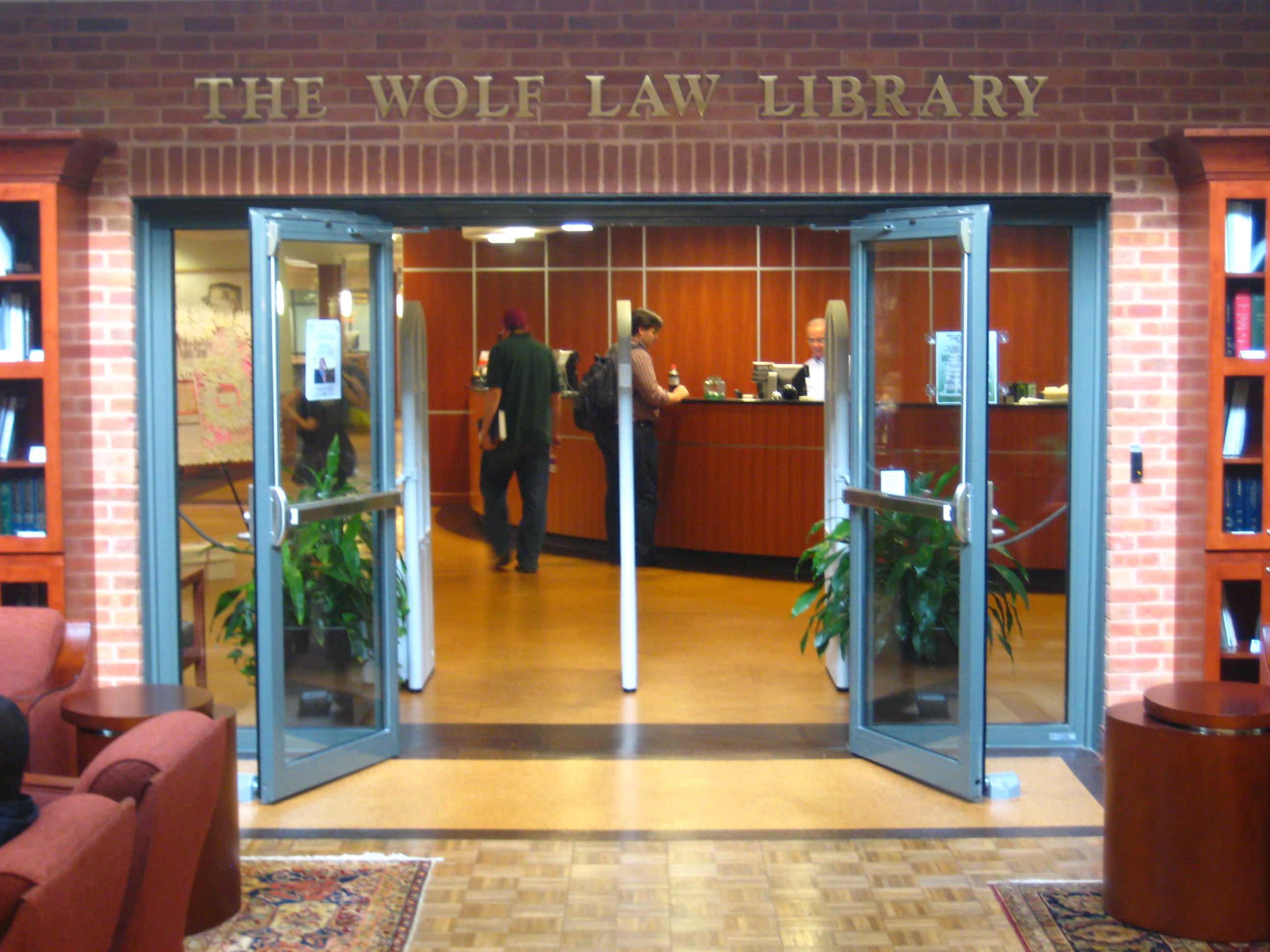
- Wolf Law Library Entrance
- 37.2648226729165°N 76.70475932333393°W
- Location: Williamsburg, Virginia, USA
- Established: 1779
- Branches: 1

Collection
- Size: 442,000 volumes

Other information
- Director: Leslie Street
- Employees: 15
- Website: Wolf Law Library

The Wolf Law Library is located at the College of William & Mary's School of Law in Williamsburg, Virginia, United States. It contains a 380,000 volume collection and is a member of the Consortium of Southeastern Law Libraries.

In 2008, The Princeton Review rated William & Mary's collective library system as the eighth best in the country and number one in the state of Virginia for a university system. The ranking was based on a survey of 120,000 students from 368 campuses nationwide.

== Mission statement ==
"The mission of the Wolf Law Library is to provide access to law and law-related resources and a wide range of services to support law school curriculum and programs, promote the advancement of legal scholarship, and fulfill the information needs of library users."

== History ==
=== Present day ===
By the end of the twentieth century, the William & Mary Law Library was cramped and in need of overall renovation. With a strong budget, professional staff, and large collection, a $16.8-million renovation began in 2003 to address those needs. Construction between the spring of 2005 and the summer of 2006 added 22,000 square feet (2,000 m^{2}) of space to the library.

On November 10, 2006, the library was renamed the Wolf Law Library to honor alumnus Henry C. Wolf (Bachelor of Arts, 1964; Juris Doctor, 1966). The new Law Library, which was completed in the spring of 2007, covers 58,000 square feet (5,400 m^{2}) and houses 442,000 volumes.
