= Steve Salbu =

American academic

- Born: New York, U.S.
- Education: Hofstra University; Dartmouth College; William & Mary Law School; Wharton School of the University of Pennsylvania
- Occupation: Academic
- Employer: Georgia Institute of Technology

Steve Salbu is an American academic. He served as the Cecil B. Day Chair in Business Ethics and dean emeritus of the Scheller College of Business at the Georgia Institute of Technology.

== Early life ==
Salbu was born in New York. He graduated from Hofstra University, where he earned a bachelor of arts degree. He earned a master of arts degree from Dartmouth College and a JD from the William & Mary Law School. He subsequently earned another master's degree followed by a PhD from the Wharton School of the University of Pennsylvania.

== Career ==
Salbu joined the McCombs School of Business at the University of Texas at Austin in 1990. He became the Bobbie and Coulter R. Sublett Centennial Endowed Professor in 2000 and subsequently served as the associate dean for graduate programs. At UT Austin, one of Salbu's students was Brian Cruver, the author of Anatomy of Greed.

Salbu was appointed as the Stephen P. Zelnak chair and dean of the Scheller College of Business at the Georgia Institute of Technology in 2006. As dean, he accepted a $50 million donation from Ernest Scheller Jr. Salbu was also one of first openly gay business school deans. In a 2012 op-ed in The New York Times, Salbu opined that mayors and aldermen should not prevent Chick-fil-A from opening branches in their cities in spite of Dan Cathy's anti-gay marriage remarks; instead, customers should choose whether to eat there or not.

Salbu retired as dean in 2014 and became the Cecil B. Day Chair in Business Ethics.
