= Longwood House (Farmville, Virginia) =

Historic house in Virginia, United States

- U.S. National Register of Historic Places
- Virginia Landmarks Register
- Longwood House in March 2014.

- Location within Virginia Location within the United States
- Location: Johnston Drive, Farmville, Virginia
- Coordinates: 37°17′30″N 78°22′48″W
- Area: 4 acres (1.6 ha)
- Built: c. 1815, c. 1839
- Architectural style: Greek Revival, Federal
- NRHP reference No.: 84003564
- VLR No.: 144-0025

Significant dates
- Added to NRHP: March 8, 1984
- Designated VLR: October 18, 1983

Longwood House is a historic home located at Farmville, Prince Edward County, Virginia, and functions as the home of the president of Longwood University. It is a 2 1/2-story, three-bay, frame dwelling with a gable roof. It features Greek Revival style woodwork and Doric order porch. Longwood House has a central passage, double-pile plan. It has a two-story wing added about 1839, and a second wing added in the 1920s, when the property was purchased by Longwood University. The house is located next to the university golf course, and since 2006, athletic fields used by the Longwood Lancers.

== History ==
The site of the home was originally owned by Scottish immigrant Peter Johnston, having purchased it in 1765. The property was later sold to Abraham B. Venable in 1811; following his death shortly thereafter in the Richmond Theatre fire, it was inherited by a relative, Samuel. The current house was built about 1815, and enlarged and remodeled about 1839. The site was the birthplace of two well-known Confederate officers: Johnston's grandson Joseph E. Johnston in 1807, and Samuel Venable's grandson, Charles S. Venable, in 1827.

Longwood House was purchased by what was then the State Teachers College at Farmville in 1929. Twenty years later, the school renamed itself Longwood College after the house; the school then changed its name to Longwood University in 2002. It has been used as the home of the university president since 1969.

It was listed on the National Register of Historic Places in 1984.
