= David J. Armor =

American social scientist and author (1938–2025)

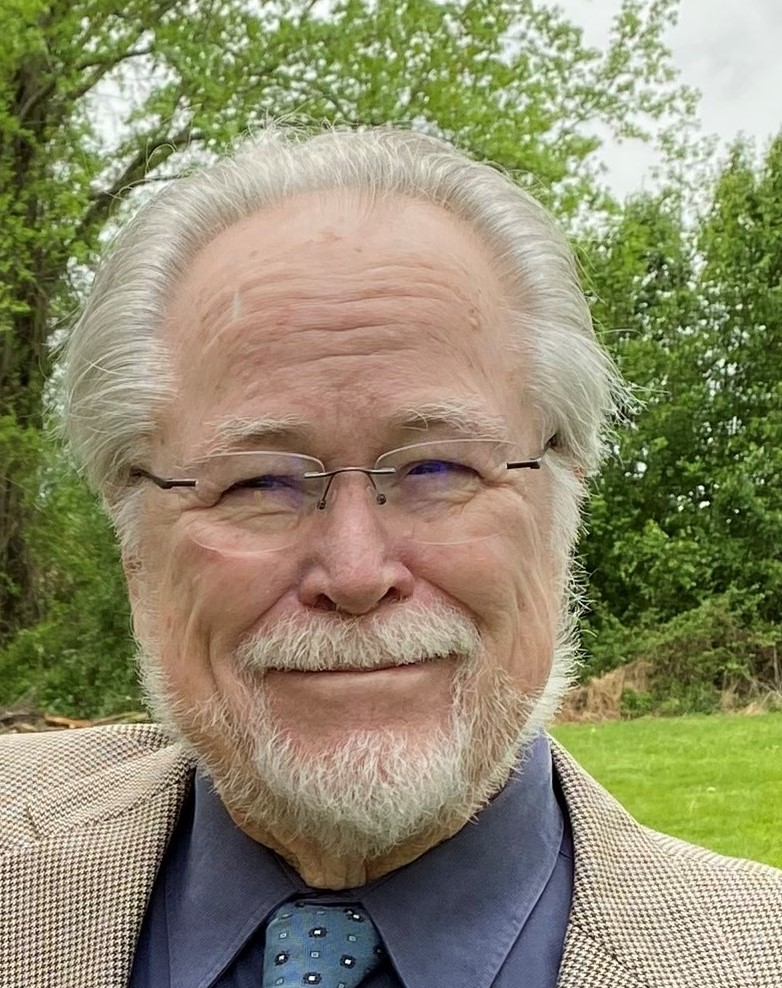
- Born: November 11, 1938; Long Beach, California, U.S.
- Died: October 11, 2025 (aged 86)
- Occupations: Academic; author; Social scientist
- Awards: Distinguished Public Service Medal, Department of Defense

Academic background
- Education: UC Berkeley (BA); Harvard University (Ph.D.)
- Website: davidjarmor.com

David J. Armor (November 11, 1938 – October 11, 2025) was an American social scientist, academic and author. He was the Professor Emeritus of Public Policy in the Schar School of Policy and Government at George Mason University.

Armor authored four books, including The American School Counselor and Forced Justice: School Desegregation and the Law, and was the co-author of five books, including The Course of Alcoholism: Four Years After Treatment. He is most known for his research in social policy, education, military manpower issues, and works on education policy, school desegregation, and military manpower policy.

== Background ==
Armor was born on November 11, 1938, in Long Beach, California. He enrolled at University of California, Berkeley and married Marilyn Sells in 1958. He was active in student politics and was elected Student Body President in 1959. He received an AB in Mathematics and Sociology, graduating in 1961. He then attended Harvard University on a Woodrow Wilson Fellowship, earning a Ph.D. in Sociology from Harvard in 1966.

Armor died on October 11, 2025, at the age of 86.

== Career ==
Armor began his academic career as an Assistant Professor of Sociology in the Department of Social Relations at Harvard University in 1965; he was promoted to Associate Professor in 1969 and held that appointment until 1972. During his time at Harvard, he co-designed (with Arthur Couch) the first user-friendly computer language named The Data Text System, for statistical analysis of text and numeric data for social science research. In 1972, he returned to California to serve as a Visiting Professor of Sociology at UCLA, and in 1973 he joined the Rand Corporation as a Senior Scientist. He left Rand in 1982 to run for Congress before being elected to the Los Angeles Board of Education in 1985. In 1986, he accepted an appointment in the Reagan administration as Principal Deputy Asst. Sec. of Defense (Force Management & Personnel) where he also served as Acting Assistant Secretary of Defense for that office from 1986 to 1989, receiving the Distinguished Public Service Medal from Secretary of Defense Caspar Weinberger. Following government service, he became a Research Professor in the Institute of Public Policy at George Mason University from 1992 to 1999 and was promoted to Professor of Public Policy in the School of Public Policy in 2000. He served as the Director of the PhD Program in Public Policy at George Mason University from 2002 to 2005. In 2011, he became Professor Emeritus of Public Policy in the Schar School of Policy and Government at George Mason University.

Armor was President of National Policy Analysts since 1989, and he conducted research on national policy issues, such as education and military issues with a particular focus on school desegregation and military manpower. He served on National Academy of Sciences committees between 1999, and 2005 focusing on issues pertaining to military recruiting. He contributed to the National Academy of Sciences report, Military Manpower Quality: Past, Present, and Future, under the committee on military enlistment standards.

== Research ==
Armor has authored numerous publications, including journal articles, book chapters, and books. His research lies in the areas of sociological methods, school desegregation, education policy, military manpower, and social welfare policy.

=== Military issues ===
Armor conducted extensive research on military issues, with a particular emphasis on military manpower issues, substance abuse, military health care. Having considered the challenges Army faced with respect to manpower quality and quantity, he evaluated enlistment standards in the Army, and explored the extent of decline in the Army recruit quality, noting its effects on job performance. In addition, he contributed to an approach for assessing the "optimal" quality mixes, and discussed the costs to restore the Army quality. Keeping race and gender representation at the core, he studied the policies concerning those factors, as well as issues pertaining to enlistment rates in the US military. Furthermore, he measured the changes in the minority representation following the All-Volunteer Force (AVF), and addressed the trends of enlistment in the American and Hispanic minorities. He proposed that the Afghanistan wars have contributed to changes in representation across the recent decades.

Armor also reviewed the patterns, and trends in the prevalence of sexual assault within the U.S. military, and inspected the measures, and strategies undertaken by the military to eliminate this issue. While looking into the service delivery programs on mental health and substance abuse in Nevada, he discussed the recommendations for their improvement.

=== Substance abuse ===
While at Rand, Armor started a research program on alcohol-related issues and explored perspectives on alcoholism, treatment, remission patterns, treatment effectiveness, and policy implications. Having assessed the remission process by investigating treated alcoholics over the course of four years, he revealed that remissions were not stable, but rather intermittent in nature. Additionally, he evaluated the effectiveness of Air Forces Alcohol Abuse program and provided recommendations for improving its efficiency to better tackle the issue.

=== Sociological methods ===
Armor contributed to the research literature in the field of research methods in sociology. He wrote a treatise on measures of reliability, proposing the coefficient of "Theta Reliability". This was based on a unified theory of reliability for social measurement called the "time-item" model which integrated the benefits the internal consistency and stability models.

=== Education policy ===
Armor is best known for his research on education policy, particularly school desegregation. He examined the educational and social impacts of school desegregation, and studied the effectiveness of school desegregation policy plans from 1968 to 1991 with a focus on White flight and interracial exposure. He highlighted primary shortcomings of desegregation policies i.e., they did not succeed at improving the pedagogy, and he found that school desegregation does not significantly or consistently impact African American achievement. It was argued that SES, such as poverty and income levels act as significant factors in impacting the student achievement, and indicated that increasing SES of African-American families contributes towards rising Black educational achievement. In one of his essays, The Evidence on Busing, he argued that busing does not create academic advantages. Another paper aimed at analyzing the reading program in selected Los Angeles minority schools, he reported that school and classroom factors, such as school autonomy, and teacher flexibility played a significant role in gains on CTBS reading test scores.

Davison M. Douglas reviewed Armor's book, Forced Justice: School Desegregation and the Law and stated that it is a "helpful analysis that which should inform the ongoing and hotly contested debate over the benefits and costs of mandatory pupil reassignments in urban school systems." The Desegregation Dilemma reviewing the same work added that, "Armor's discussions of the effectiveness of mandatory and voluntary techniques... will provide much-needed guidance for those who still wish to strive toward the integrative deal."

In his review of Armor's book, Maximizing Intelligence, Chester E. Finn highlighted that he "spells out ten "risk factors," and noted that his strategy to maximize children's intelligence is "via their parents and that the appropriate policy tools entail strengthening parents and families and mitigating the adverse "risk factors."

== Awards and honors ==
- 1961–62 – Woodrow Wilson Fellowship, Harvard University
- 1976 – Article of the Year, Journal of Studies on Alcoholism
- 1989 – Distinguished Public Service Medal, Department of Defense

== Bibliography ==
=== Selected books ===
- The American School Counselor: A Case Study in the Sociology of Professions (1969) ISBN 978-0871540690
- Data-text Primer: An Introduction to Computerized Social Data Analysis (1972) ISBN 978-0029010204
- Alcoholism and Treatment (1978) ISBN 978-0471025580
- School Desegregation in the 21st Century (2002) ISBN 978-0275977696
- Maximizing Intelligence (2013) ISBN 978-0765801852
- The Scandinavian Prison Study (2020) ISBN 978-3030264642
- School Resources, the Achievement Gap, and the Law (2024) ISBN 978-1032498744

=== Selected articles ===
- Armor, D. J. (1972). The Evidence on Busing. Research Report. Public Interest, 28, 90–126.
- Armor, D. J. (1973). Theta reliability and factor scaling. Sociological methodology, 5, 17–50.
- Armor, D. (1976). Analysis of the school preferred reading program in selected Los Angeles minority schools.
- Armor, D. J., Polich, J. M., & Stambul, H. B. (1976). Alcoholism and treatment.
- Polich, J. M., Armor, D. J., & Braiker, H. B. (1980). The course of alcoholism: Four years after treatment. RAND CORP SANTA MONICA CA.
- Rough, J. A., & Armor, D. J. (2017). Sexual assault in the US military: Trends and responses. World Medical & Health Policy, 9(2), 206–224.
- Armor, D. J., Marks, G. N., & Malatinszky, A. (2018). The impact of school SES on student achievement: Evidence from US statewide achievement data. Educational Evaluation and Policy Analysis, 40(4), 613–630.
- Armor, D. J., Rossel, C. H. Black Achievement, White Flight, and Brown's Legacy. Education Next Summer. 24(3).
