= Longwood University =

Public university in Farmville, Virginia, US

Coordinates: 37°18′5.6″N 78°23′39.1″W

- Former names: Farmville Female Seminary (1839–1860); Farmville Female College (1860–1875); Farmville College (1875–1884); State Female Normal School (1884–1914); State Normal School for Women (1914–1924); State Teachers College (1924–1949); Longwood College (1949–2002)
- Motto: Docemus Docere (Latin)
- Motto in English: "We Teach To Enlighten"
- Type: Public university
- Established: March 5, 1839; 187 years ago
- Accreditation: SACS
- Academic affiliations: SCHEV
- Endowment: $117.75 million (2025)
- President: W. Taylor Reveley IV
- Rector: Ronald O. White
- Students: 5,096
- Undergraduates: 4,574
- Postgraduates: 522
- Location: Farmville, Virginia, United States
- Campus: 154 acres (0.62 km^{2}); Remote town
- Newspaper: The Rotunda
- Colors: Blue and white
- Nickname: Lancers
- Sporting affiliations: NCAA Division I – Big South; MAC
- Mascot: Elwood
- Website: longwood.edu

Longwood University is a public university in Farmville, Virginia, United States. Founded on March 5, 1839, it is the third-oldest public university in Virginia and one of the hundred oldest institutions of higher education in the United States. Originally established as the Farmville Female Seminary, a female seminary, normal school, and college, later becoming widely known as Longwood or Longwood College. The university became coeducational in 1976 and officially attained university status on July 1, 2002.

Longwood University comprises three undergraduate academic colleges: the Cook-Cole College of Arts and Sciences, the College of Business and Economics, and the College of Education and Human Services. Academically advanced students may also choose the Cormier Honors College while graduate students and working professionals are admitted into the College of Graduate and Professional Studies.

In early April 1865, armies under the command of Generals Robert E. Lee and Ulysses S. Grant marched past the north end of campus on Lee's retreat to Appomattox just days before the end of the American Civil War. At the south end of campus lies the former Robert Russa Moton High School, site of the 1951 student strike that became one of the five court cases culminating in the historic Brown v. Board of Education decision.

== History ==
=== Early history (1839–1884) ===
Longwood was founded on March 5, 1839 as the Farmville Female Seminary Association. Led by Solomon Lea, a Methodist minister who had taught at Randolph–Macon College, the school flourished. Lea left to become the first president of Greensboro Female Seminary (now Greensboro College) in his native North Carolina, and several presidents and name changes followed in the subsequent decades. Led by a number of Methodist ministers, the school offered English, Latin, Greek, French, and piano.

As was common among female seminaries during the Reconstruction Era, Farmville Female College, as the institution was then known, fell into a period of deep financial difficulty. The decade following the Civil War saw many seminaries around the South shutter their doors. The college was given new life on June 5, 1875, with a new charter granted and the college renamed Farmville College. Paul Whitehead, a minister from nearby Nelson County, Virginia, who had been president of Wesleyan Female College at Murfreesboro, North Carolina, was appointed president. Under Whitehead, enrollment grew by nearly half, topping 100 students in 1876. Whitehead resigned in 1872 to return to full-time ministry.

=== Normal School (1884–1949) ===
Farmville College was reinvented once again on March 7, 1884, as the State Female Normal School—the brainchild of William Henry Ruffner, the first Virginia State Superintendent of Instruction. Modeled after the French École normale supérieure, which had been developed in the late 18th century as a model for teacher preparation, the State Female Normal School is one of the oldest of several normal schools in the state.

In 1902, Joseph L. Jarman was named president of the State Female Normal School, a post that lasted an astounding forty-four years. Jarman reshaped the physical campus from a single Victorian structure to a row of colonnaded Jeffersonian brick buildings that forms the core of today's campus. The academic program was also overhauled: the two-year teacher training program that had been in place since the college's founding was replaced with a four-year college academic program with permission to grant degrees. Jarman instituted the Honor Code, which survives to this day, and the student government. Through still several name changes—State Female Normal School (1884), State Normal School for Women (1914) and State Teachers College (1924)—Jarman shaped the institution into one of the most well-respected teacher preparatory colleges in the state.

During Jarman's presidency, the college purchased in 1928 the nearby estate of the Longwood House, which would become the namesake of the institution in years to come.

=== Longwood College (1949–2002) ===
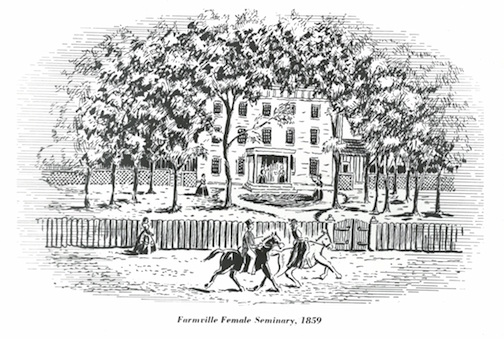
Farmville Female Seminary

With an expanding curriculum and growing class sizes, State Teachers College was renamed a penultimate time to Longwood College, its namesake being the nearby estate purchased by the Jarman administration. Longwood—with a focus still very much on teacher preparation—expanded its academic degrees, and in 1954 was authorized to issue graduate diplomas. The campus grew quickly in the ensuing years—three dormitories were constructed perpendicular to the core four Jeffersonian buildings: Wheeler, Cox and South Cunningham dormitories all arose between 1959 and 1963.

In 1964, the issue of coeducation arose but the Board of Visitors rejected the notion. The tide swung four years later, when Longwood began to admit male summer school transfers, and then junior and senior transfers in 1971. Men were admitted as day students in 1973, by order of the Virginia Department of Education until Longwood went fully coeducational in 1976.

In 1981, Janet Greenwood became the first woman president in the modern history of Longwood. She served until 1987.

William F. Dorrill, president from 1988 to 1996, was instrumental in increasing Longwood's international population and expanding study-abroad opportunities for students and faculty through partnerships with numerous educational institutions around the world.

A fire burned the Rotunda building on April 24, 2001. The building was undergoing extensive renovations at the time, and no one was injured in the blaze, though the Rotunda and much of Grainger Hall required rebuilding.

A popular myth holds that whenever the college changed its name, a fire broke out on campus.
- November 24, 1923: Just before the school changed its name to State Teachers College, a fire destroyed the dining hall that sat behind iconic Ruffner Hall.
- March 9, 1949: Weeks before the school changed its name to Longwood College, a fire destroyed White House Hall, a building next to the Rotunda (currently where part of Main Tabb sits) and a mirror image to Grainger Hall. White House Hall housed an auditorium that was destroyed in the fire, but then-President Dabney Lancaster opted to wait two years for a new auditorium could be completed instead of rebuilding White House Hall. Tabb Hall was eventually expanded to connect directly to the Rotunda.
- April 23, 2001: Just before the college changed its name to Longwood University, the Rotunda caught fire during renovations. Grainger Hall, which had been connected to the Rotunda at the time, suffered severe water damage and also had to be rebuilt.

=== Longwood University (2002–present) ===
Virginia Governor Mark Warner signed legislation designating Longwood a university on April 2, 2002, one year to the day after The Great Fire that burned the Rotunda and significantly damaged Grainger Hall. Then-president Patricia P. Cormier said at the time that a "university is a better reflection of the type of institution that Longwood is today. We are a comprehensive entity with a broad array of undergraduate majors and minors as well as graduate programs." Since becoming a university, Longwood has expanded its physical campus and academic offerings.

The 70,822-square-foot (6,579.6 m^{2}) John H. and Karen Chichester Science Center opened in 2005. Longwood's Health and Fitness Center, which opened in 2007, was the first higher education building in Virginia to be awarded the gold level of LEED certification. A new 41,983-square-foot Center for Communication Studies and Theater opened in 2009 to house the rapidly growing communication studies major. That building is adjacent to Bedford Hall, home of the art program, which was expanded and renovated in 2012. Three residence halls were renovated between 2007–14: Wheeler Hall (2007), Cox Hall (2008) and Stubbs Hall (2014).

Two residence halls and a commons building opened in 2013 at Lancer Park, an off-campus apartment complex. The residence halls house about 450 students, in addition to the 264 students who were already living there in apartments and townhouses. Longwood has managed the complex since 2006.

In keeping with campus tradition, in 2004 three major campus buildings were named for former university presidents. The dining hall was named Dorrill Dining Hall for William F. Dorrill, president from 1988–1996; the library was named Greenwood Library for Janet D. Greenwood (1981–1987); and Lancer Hall was named Willett Hall for Henry I. Willett Jr. (1967–1981).

Since receiving university designation, the academic profile has expanded, notably through the addition of programs in nursing, environmental science, athletic training, animation, and cybersecurity, among many others.

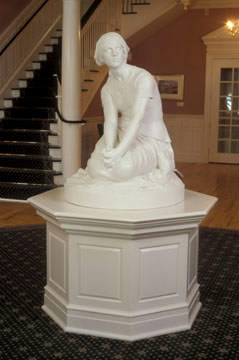
Joan of Arc statue under the Rotunda

On March 23, 2013, Longwood's Board of Visitors introduced W. Taylor Reveley IV as the university's 26th president. Reveley's father, W. Taylor Reveley III, was the president of the College of William & Mary, and his grandfather W. Taylor Reveley II was president of Hampden–Sydney College.

On September 23, 2015, the Commission on Presidential Debates named Longwood as the host for the 2016 United States vice presidential debate, which occurred on October 4, 2016.

=== Longwood University Coat of Arms & Armorial Bearings (2026) ===
On June 22, 2026, Longwood announced that the university had been formally granted an official coat of arms and heraldic insignia by the College of Arms in the United Kingdom. The grant made Longwood one of only three colleges and universities in Virginia to receive official armorial bearings from the College of Arms, alongside College of William & Mary and Hampden–Sydney College. Developed through a petition process that began in 2024, the design incorporates symbols associated with the university’s history, mission, and longstanding connection to Joan of Arc, including fleurs-de-lis, a sword, and heraldic coronets. Additional elements reference Virginia, education, citizen leadership, and Longwood’s traditions. The letters patent conferring the arms were presented at the British Embassy in Washington, D.C., on June 16, 2026, and the completed heraldic achievement was adopted as part of the university’s official visual identity.

== Academics ==
Longwood University is a small, highly residential public university that offers more than 100 majors and minors across three main academic colleges. It requires every student who graduates to complete an internship, directed research or guided field experience in their field of study.

One of the centerpiece hands-on learning opportunities available to students is LU@YNP, an annual interdisciplinary program held at Yellowstone National Park that exposes participants to public issues in and around the park. In addition, students have the opportunity to study abroad at one of many faculty-led intensive study trips to places like Costa Rica, Thailand, and Greece.

Longwood is accredited by the Southern Association of Colleges and Schools.

=== Cook-Cole College of Arts and Sciences ===
Individual program accreditations
Longwood Theatre program	National Association of Schools of Theatre.
Longwood Music department	National Association of Schools of Music
Nursing program	Commission on Collegiate Nursing Education

The largest college at Longwood, the Cook-Cole College of Arts and Sciences houses the core of the liberal arts offerings at the university and offers 18 majors with dozens of minors and concentrations.

The English and Modern Languages department at Longwood University awards the annual John Dos Passos Prize For Literature, founded in 1980. Notable past recipients include Graham Greene, Tom Wolfe, Shelby Foote, Paule Marshall, Ernest J. Gaines, E. Annie Proulx, and Sherman Alexie. The 2014 Dos Passos Prize winner was Ruth Ozeki.

The college is named for John Randall Cook '52 and Waverly Manson Cole, who endowed the college in 2006.

=== College of Business and Economics ===
Longwood's College of Business and Economics is accredited by Association to Advance Collegiate Schools of Business International since 1998. Undergraduate students of the college are able to earn either a bachelor of science or bachelor of business administration. The college also offers an online Master's of Business Administration (MBA) program.

=== College of Education, Health, and Human Services ===
Individual program accreditations
Initial Teacher Preparation	Council for the Accreditation of Educator Programs.
Athletic Training	Commission on Accreditation of Athletic Training Education
Social Work	Council on Social Work Education
Therapeutic Recreation	National Recreation and Park Association

Longwood's College of Education, Health, and Human Services houses teacher preparation faculty alongside social work, communication sciences and disorders, health, physical education, therapeutic recreation, and kinesiology programs. The college also offers online speech language pathology courses to prepare students for graduate-level coursework.

=== College of Graduate and Professional Studies ===
Individual program accreditations
M.Ed. in reading, literacy and learning	Council for Accreditation of Educator Preparation
M.Ed. in education	Council for Accreditation of Educator Preparation
M.S. in communication sciences and disorders	Council on Academic Accreditation in Audiology and the American Speech-Language-Hearing Association
M.Ed. in school librarianship	Council for Accreditation of Educator Preparation

Students of the College of Graduate and Professional Studies earn a master of science or master of education degree. A fully online Masters of Business Administration is also offered.

Professional studies offer for-credit teacher licensure/recertification courses, Speech Language Pathology prerequisite courses (SLP Online), and courses for the educational leadership endorsement. A variety of non-credit classes are offered for teacher recertification including partnerships with the Virginia Holocaust Museum and the Virginia Museum of History & Culture.

=== Cormier Honors College ===
Founded in 1983 as the Arts & Sciences Honor Program, the Honors College was named for outgoing President Patricia P. Cormier in 2008. Cormier Scholars are a group of selected students who mostly live together in a learning-enriched environment and enjoy smaller classes, close interaction with faculty members, increased opportunities for independent undergraduate research and an emphasis on experiential learning outside the classroom.

== Campus ==
Longwood's main campus comprises approximately 154 acres (0.62 km2) near downtown Farmville, Virginia, in a triangle bordered by High Street, Griffin Boulevard and Main Street.

The architecture of the campus ranges from its more historic "north core" to its more contemporary southern end organized along a central promenade, Brock Commons. The north core stretches along High Street and consists of four historic brick Jeffersonian buildings: French Hall, Tabb Hall, the Rotunda, and Grainger Hall. These buildings are joined by a covered colonnade and bear the university's signature red roofs.

The rest of campus is organized along a picturesque central promenade, Brock Commons, that stretches south perpendicular to High Street. Located along Brock Commons are the university's dining hall, student union, library, gymnasium, music and arts buildings and the homes of the College of Business and Economics and the College of Education and Human Services. A new student center, the Norman H. and Elsie Stossel Upchurch University Center, opened in 2018 on the site of the former Cunningham residence hall. At the south end of Brock Commons sits the Health and Fitness Center, an 80,000-square-foot facility that features an indoor track, basketball and racquetball courts, a climbing room and exercise equipment. It was completed in 2007 and is certified GOLD by Leadership in Energy and Environmental Design (LEED).

=== On-campus housing ===
Longwood offers seven on-campus residence halls: Cox Hall, Register Hall, Sharp Hall, Moss Hall, Johns Hall, Wheeler Hall, and Stubbs Hall. Moss Hall and Johns Hall are high-rise style residence halls. Wheeler Hall primarily houses students in the Cormier Honors College, while Stubbs Hall is a women-only residence hall that houses most of the university's sorority chapters and many of their members.

=== Off-campus housing ===
Across Main Street, the Longwood Landings are four buildings comprising student housing and first floor restaurant/retail space. The southeast building features a commons area with lounge and study areas for students. Nearly all stores below the student living areas accept the schools' dining dollars, allowing students to eat in the restaurants freely between classes.

Lancer Park (formerly known as Stanley Park) houses upperclassmen in one of Longwood's apartment communities, featuring two residence halls and several townhouse and apartment buildings. It is home to the POD Market, which provides grab-and-go food and drinks, a large meeting room, gaming area, and fitness center among many athletic fields and facilities. It is accessible from the main campus by pedestrian bridges.

Longwood Village consists of eight buildings 2.5 miles away from the main campus. Longwood Village is currently pending redevelopment and is not available to students.

=== Longwood Center for the Visual Arts ===
The art museum of Longwood University, Longwood Center for the Visual Arts, or LCVA as it is more commonly known, was established in 1978 to house the university's substantial museum collections and further foster an appreciation of art among the student body. The LCVA moved into its current home on Main Street, just off main campus, in 1993. Annually it serves more than 38,000 children, adults and students, who enjoy its exhibitions, workshops and lectures.

In 2014, the LCVA formalized an agreement to assume control of the Folk Art Society of America. In the agreement, the LCVA will serve as a repository for an invaluable collection of primary Folk Art source material, publish its annual magazine, and manage its growing ranks of several hundred members. The LCVA currently holds an impressive collection of folk art.

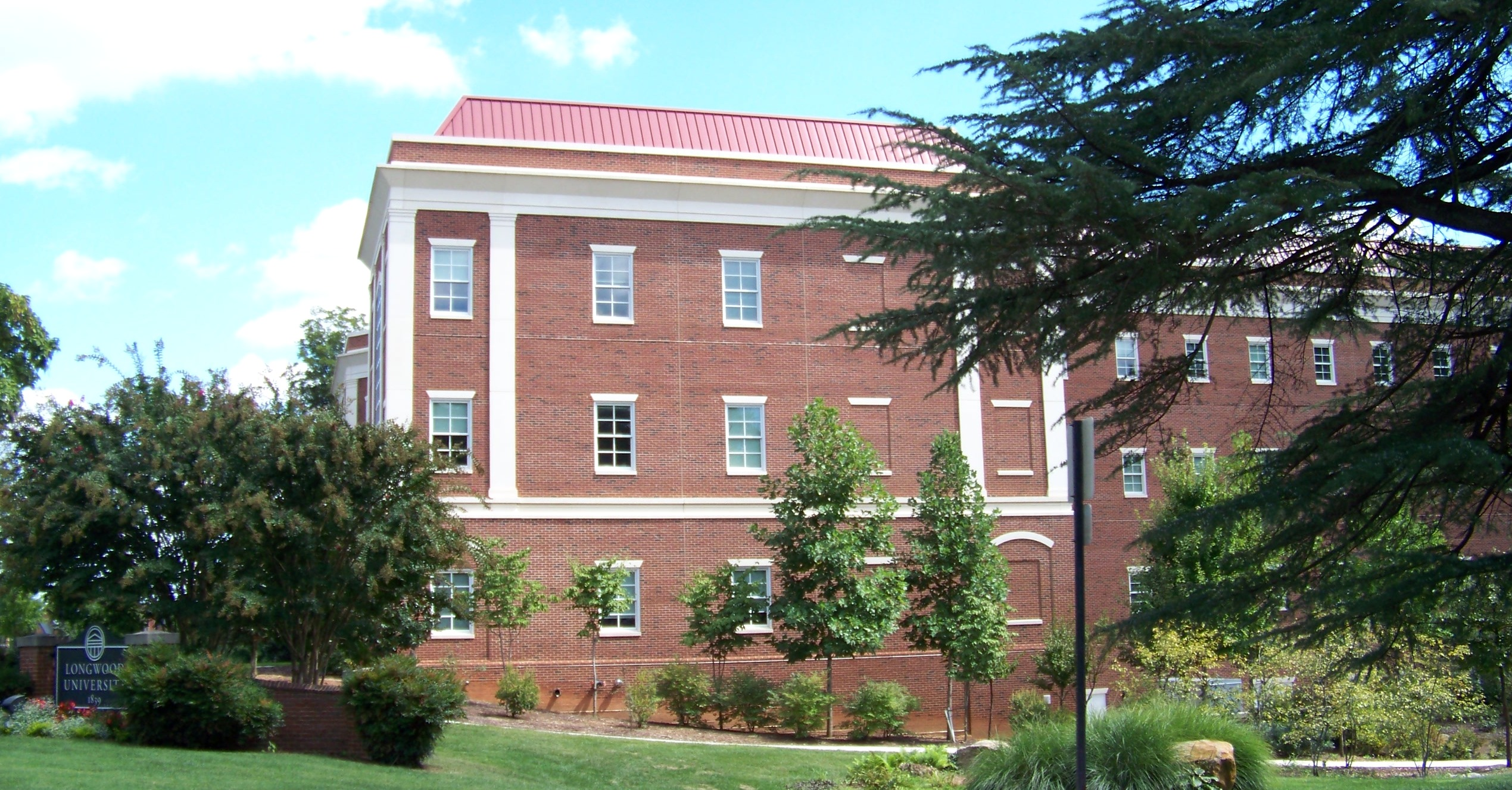
Side view of Chichester Science Center on Longwood's campus

In addition to operating the museum, the LCVA partners with several regional school systems to supplement art education.

=== Hull Springs Farm ===
Longwood also operates Hull Springs Farm, a 662-acre plantation on two tributaries of the Potomac River in Westmoreland County, Virginia. The plantation was bequeathed to Longwood by Mary Farley Ames Lee, class of 1938, in 1999. It is currently the site of several environmental and archaeological research studies.

=== Sustainability ===
Longwood annually saves about $4.5 million in fuel costs by using woody biomass (sawdust). Nearly all of the campus' heat and hot water are provided by burning woody biomass, mostly pine and some hardwood, which is a byproduct from local sawmills. Longwood is the only public institution of higher education in Virginia and one of only two state agencies that burns biomass for heating fuel, which the university has done since 1983.

Longwood House

=== Longwood House ===
Located southeast of the university's main campus, Longwood House has served as the official residence of the president of Longwood since 1969. The house stands on the historic Longwood estate, the former home of the Venable and Barber families and is the namesake of the university. Built in 1811, the original house burned and was rebuilt in 1815 by Nathaniel E. Venable. The estate was acquired by the State Teachers College in 1928. Confederate General Joseph E. Johnston was born in another house on the estate that no longer exists on the property.

== Athletics ==
Longwood University's 14 varsity athletics programs, known as the Lancers, compete at the NCAA Division I level. Thirteen of those teams compete in the Big South Conference, while field hockey is a member of the Mid-American Conference.

Longwood has six varsity men's teams, including baseball, basketball, cross country, golf, soccer and tennis. Longwood's eight women's sports include basketball, cross country, field hockey, golf, lacrosse, soccer, softball and tennis. The program has produced a number of professional athletes, most notably Jerome Kersey (NBA), Michael Tucker (MLB), and Tina Barrett (LPGA), all of whom were part of the school's inaugural Athletics Hall of Fame Class in 2006. Alumnus Mark Montgomery is also currently a relief pitcher in the New York Yankees organization.

In the 2021-22 season, both the Longwood men's and women's basketball teams won their respective Big South Conference tournaments, securing the programs' first-ever appearances in the NCAA Division I tournament in school history. The men's team captured the conference title again in 2024, earning a second bid to the NCAA tournament.

The Longwood softball program won Big South Championships in 2013, 2015, and 2016, three of their first four years of conference membership. The Lancers earned an automatic bid to an NCAA Regional all three times, becoming Longwood's first program in the Division I era to reach the NCAA postseason. They won one game in the 2015 tournament, and two in 2016.

=== Club sports ===
Longwood also has many club sports, including rugby, baseball, football, men's lacrosse, roller hockey, golf, and others. The Men's Rugby Team took 3rd place in USA Rugby's Division 3 National Tournament in 2007, and again in 2009. In 2011 Men's Rugby won the National Championship. The 2010-2011 season ended with the Lancers ranked #1 in the nation for Division III schools. They beat Occidental College (CA) in the National Championship by the score of 36-27 on May 1 in Virginia Beach, VA. The National Championship is the school's first. The club baseball team in their second year of competition made it to the Division II club baseball world series in Johnstown, PA. They went 2-2 and finished 4th.

== Student life ==
Undergraduate demographics as of Fall 2023
Race and ethnicity	Total
White	72%
Black	10%
Hispanic	7%
Two or more races	5%
Asian	2%
International student	2%
Unknown	2%
Economic diversity
Low-income (Note: The percentage of students who received an income-based federal Pell grant intended for low-income students.)	28%
Affluent (Note: The percentage of students who are a part of the American middle class at the bare minimum.)	72%

Located in Farmville, Virginia, Longwood is within 65 miles of three of Virginia's urban centers: Richmond (65 miles), Charlottesville (60 miles) and Lynchburg (45 miles). In addition to existing adjacent to one of Southside Virginia's historic downtowns, there are several outdoors opportunities available to students. The 31-mile High Bridge Trail is a short walk from campus, and the centerpiece of the path, the nearly half-mile long High Bridge, is just four miles from campus and easily accessible by bicycle or foot. The Appomattox River, a popular canoeing destination, also runs a short walk from campus. The Appalachian Trail is a short drive west, and there are several golf courses nearby.

=== Greek life ===
Longwood is the birthplace of four national sororities, referred to as the Farmville Four: Kappa Delta in 1897, Sigma Sigma Sigma in 1898, Zeta Tau Alpha in 1898 and Alpha Sigma Alpha in 1901.

At Longwood, there are eight recognized College Panhellenic Council (CPC) sororities on campus, these include: Alpha Delta Pi, Alpha Gamma Delta, Alpha Sigma Alpha, Alpha Sigma Tau, Zeta Tau Alpha, Kappa Delta, Sigma Kappa and Sigma Sigma Sigma.

Six Interfraternity Council (IFC) fraternities have chapters at Longwood, these are: Alpha Sigma Phi, Theta Chi, Pi Kappa Phi, Phi Kappa Tau, Phi Mu Delta and Sigma Nu.

The National Pan-Hellenic Council (NPHC) has six chapters as well on Longwood's campus, namely: Alpha Phi Alpha, Alpha Kappa Alpha, Delta Sigma Theta, Phi Beta Sigma, Zeta Phi Beta and Sigma Gamma Rho.

=== Secret societies ===
Longwood is home to three secret societies: CHI, Princeps, and Cahoots. CHI was founded on October 15, 1900, and serves to promote the Longwood spirit. Members are secretly tapped and revealed only at the conclusion of their senior year during the annual CHI Burning, a large burning held on campus. CHI members at times leave "CHI droppings" on campus, and it is considered rare for someone to find one. Members of CHI, hidden beneath blue robes, occasionally process through campus in what are known as "CHI walks." CHI is represented around campus by an image of the Rotunda painted on the sidewalk. It is considered bad luck to step on the CHI symbol. Princeps was founded on seven principles of leadership and also keeps member identities secret until a revealing their senior year. The organization honors academically successful students each year by posting their symbol—a seven-pointed crown—on the residence hall doors of each student who makes the dean's or president's list. Princeps' crown symbol also appears on campus sidewalks, but it is considered good luck to step or jump on the symbol before exams.

=== Joan of Arc ===
Longwood University's patron hero is Joan of Arc. The university's three sculptures of the 15th-century French heroine are French sculptor Henri-Michel-Antoine Chapu's 1870 plaster statue officially titled Jeanne d'Arc, and known affectionately as "Joanie on the Stony"; Anna Hyatt Huntington's 1915 bronze Joan of Arc equestrian statue, nicknamed "Joanie on the Pony"; and Alexander Stoddart's heroic monument, dedicated on November 9, 2018. In October 2009, the Huntington statue was vandalized. After being restored, it was placed in the Rotunda in April 2010.

== Notable people ==
=== Alumni ===
Name	Class year	Notability	Reference(s)
Celestia Parrish	1886	early psychologist and groundbreaking educator	
Jessie Ball duPont	1902	noted philanthropist and educator	
Carrie Sutherlin	190x ?	college president	
Gene Grabeel	1941	mathematician and cryptanalyst, founder of the Venona project	
Alma Hunt	1941	Baptist leader	
Eva Mae Fleming Scott	1947	first woman elected to the Virginia Senate	
Lynne Agee	1971	women's college basketball coach with 600+ wins	
William E. Todd	1983	acting U.S. Under Secretary of State for Management	
Tina Barrett	1988	professional golfer	
Michael Tucker	1993	former professional baseball player	
Indira Etwaroo	1994	executive director of RestorationART and the Billie Holiday Theatre	
Amy Lynn Bradley	1997	disappeared from Royal Caribbean's "Rhapsody of the Seas" in 1998.	
Ransford Doherty	1997	actor	
Jerome Kersey	2006	former professional basketball player; drafted in 1984, finished degree in 2006.	
Brian McCullough	2007	former Longwood baseball coach	
Shane Johnson	2012	soccer player	
Megan Baltzell	2015	one of the top ten home run hitters in Division I softball	
Quincy Taylor	2015	professional basketball player	
Pat McGee	did not graduate	singer, songwriter	
Jason Mraz	did not graduate	singer, songwriter	
Matt Van Oekel	did not graduate	soccer player	

=== Faculty and staff ===
- Bevin Alexander military historian and author
- Frances R. Brown, English professor and associate dean of students
- Seth Clabough, writer
- Billy C. Clark, writer
- Patrick Finnegan, United States Army general
- Don Higginbotham, historian and professor
- Jhonnatan Medina-Álvarez, Venezuelan tennis player
- Arthur Poister, musical artist
- W. Taylor Reveley IV, lawyer and academic administrator
- Francis Butler Simkins, historian
- Carrie Sutherlin, English professor
- Alexander Theroux, writer
- Robert Tollison, economist
- Allen Wier, novelist

== See also ==
- Farmville fire department
