= Jessica Aber =

American lawyer (1981–2025)

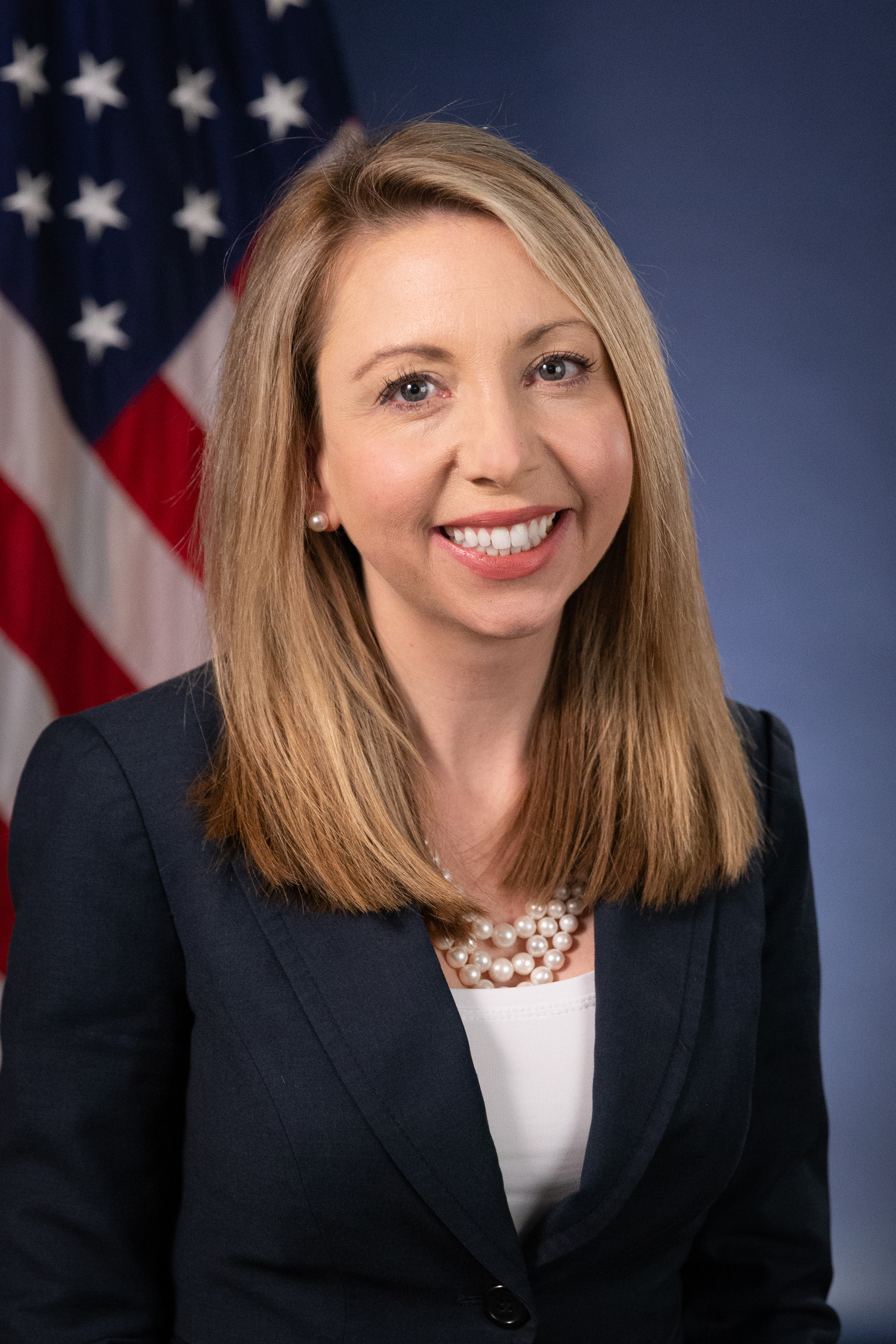
- Official portrait, 2021

United States Attorney for the Eastern District of Virginia
- In office October 12, 2021 – January 20, 2025
- Appointed by: Joe Biden
- Preceded by: Raj Parekh (acting)
- Succeeded by: Erik Siebert

Personal details
- Born: Jessica Diane Aber; September 9, 1981 Walnut Creek, California, U.S.
- Died: March 22, 2025 (aged 43) Alexandria, Virginia, U.S.
- Education: University of Richmond (BA); College of William & Mary (JD)

Jessica Diane Aber (September 9, 1981 – March 22, 2025) was an American attorney who served as the United States Attorney for the Eastern District of Virginia (EDVA) from 2021 to 2025. She was known for prosecuting high-profile cases involving organized crime and national security.

== Early life and education ==
Born in Walnut Creek, California, in 1981, Aber graduated magna cum laude with a Bachelor of Arts from the University of Richmond in 2003. She earned her Juris Doctor from the William & Mary Law School in 2006.

== Career ==
After clerking for Magistrate Judge M. Hannah Lauck in the EDVA (2006–2007), Aber worked as an associate at McGuireWoods before joining the EDVA U.S. Attorney's Office in 2009 as an Assistant United States Attorney. She later served as Counsel to the Assistant Attorney General for the DOJ's Criminal Division (2015–2016) and Deputy Chief of the EDVA Criminal Division (2016–2021).

=== U.S. Attorney for the Eastern District of Virginia ===
Nominated by President Biden in August 2021, Aber was confirmed by the Senate on October 5, 2021, and sworn in on October 12, 2021. Her tenure included several notable cases, including the prosecution of an MS-13 leader for multiple murders, indictments against Russian nationals for operating illicit cryptocurrency exchanges, historic war crimes charges against Russian soldiers for actions in Ukraine, the conviction of an Israeli national for the smuggling of non-citizens into the United States, and the conviction of a former CIA analyst for leaking classified information.

Aber resigned on January 20, 2025, following the presidential transition.

== Illness and death ==
Aber died at her home in Alexandria, Virginia, on March 22, 2025, at the age of 43. The Virginia State Medical Examiner’s Office ruled her cause of death as sudden unexpected death in epilepsy.

Legal offices
Preceded by Raj Parekh; Acting	United States Attorney for the Eastern District of Virginia; 2021–2025	Succeeded by Erik Siebert; Acting
