= W. Taylor Reveley II =

American academic

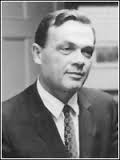

18th President of Hampden-Sydney College
- In office 1963–1977
- Preceded by: Thomas Edward Gilmer
- Succeeded by: Josiah Bunting III

Personal details
- Born: Walter Taylor Reveley II; February 11, 1917
- Died: December 30, 1992 (aged 75)
- Spouse: Mary Gary Eason
- Education: Hampden-Sydney College; Union Presbyterian Seminary; Duke University
- Profession: Minister, Professor

Walter Taylor Reveley II (February 11, 1917 – December 30, 1992) served as the 18th president of Hampden-Sydney College from 1963 to 1977. Founded in 1775 with other colonial colleges, Hampden-Sydney is one of the oldest institutions of higher education in America. During Reveley's presidency, a time of significant social and political unrest throughout the country, the faculty increased by more than 40 percent, the student body grew from roughly 500 to 800 and the endowment doubled. Major construction projects, including a science center and a library addition, were completed, and the college celebrated its bicentennial. He also oversaw the modernizing of the curriculum and the integration of the College.

== Life and career ==
Reveley graduated from Hampden-Sydney in 1939. His wife of 51 years, Marie Gary Eason Reveley, graduated from nearby Longwood University the following year. He was elected president of his freshman, sophomore, and junior classes and in his senior year was president of the student body. At his graduation, he was honored with the Tiger Trophy, given to the outstanding senior, the Gammon Cup, for character, scholarship, and athletic ability, and the Algernon Sydney Sullivan Medallion for “excellence of character and generous service to his fellows.” Reveley then received a divinity degree from Union Presbyterian Seminary and doctorate from Duke University.

A Presbyterian minister and World War II veteran, prior to becoming president of Hampden-Sydney he was a professor and dean at Rhodes College. Upon his retirement from Hampden-Sydney, an editorial in the Richmond Times-Dispatch commented, “He served during one of the most difficult times to be a college president, yet this 14-year period turned out to be one of the most productive in the proud history” of Hampden-Sydney College.

When Reveley died in 1992, then-President of the College Samuel Vaughan Wilson said, “Dr. Reveley typified what we mean by the term ‘Hampden-Sydney Man.’ As president, he was marked by his innate sense of fairness, his open-minded tolerance for opposing views, his patience with restless young students, and compassion for anyone in distress. He had a far-sighted sense of vision for Hampden-Sydney College, on which we still draw today.”

Reveley is a member of the College's Athletic Hall of Fame, and the Reveley Scholarship is named in his honor. His son W. Taylor Reveley III served as President of the College of William and Mary from 2008 to 2018, and his grandson W. Taylor Reveley IV has served as President of Longwood University since 2013.
