= James E. Reveley =

Texas mortician and consumer advocate for the American funeral industry

James E. Reveley (January 2, 1944 - January 18, 2023) was an American mortician, dentist, and consumer advocate for the regulation of the American funeral industry. Through the 1970s, he helped push the Texas Legislature to overhaul the funeral industry's oversight body, eliminate antiquated laws requiring embalming, and pass ground-breaking legislation to protect grieving consumers from exploitative practices. Following his success in Texas, Reveley continued his fight at the national level helping the Federal Trade Commission's Funeral Rule overcome industry opposition and survive congressional veto, transforming the way the funeral industry operates nationwide.

== Early years and career ==
Reveley was born and raised in San Antonio, Texas and graduated in 1962 from Highlands High School on the southeast side of the city. At the age of 16 he took a job in the funeral industry, working his way up from collecting the bodies of the recently deceased to becoming a licensed mortician and funeral director.

Eventually Reveley grew frustrated at the emphasis on up-selling grieving clients and quit his job as a funeral director to enroll in dental school, continuing to work as an embalmer to cover his costs. Upon graduation he began to practice dentistry in San Antonio.

In 1978, Reveley returned to the funeral industry, opening Reveley Memorial Services in San Antonio where he began providing low-cost funerals to his community. He later expanded to serve the Austin market, and he grew his business by convincing clients they did not need a fancy, expensive funeral to show respect for their deceased family members. Reveley provided burials for $365 in a pine box, when the average cost of a funeral in America was $1,400, using refrigeration to avoid running afoul of the state's embalming requirements.

== Advocacy ==
Reveley was inspired to become an advocate for changing the funeral industry after reading Jessica Mitford's The American Way of Death. In addition to providing a low-cost funeral option to consumers at Reveley Memorial Services, he also set out to change legislative and regulatory policy in Texas alongside Senator Lloyd Doggett of Austin.

In 1979, the industry-run State Board of Morticians came up for Sunset review by the Texas State Legislature. At the same time, the Texas Department of Health was considering changing its regulations requiring embalming for all deceased persons in the state, a financially lucrative, but unnecessary, practice. After a contentious battle between Texas Funeral Directors Association and a coalition of consumer rights groups led by Doggett and Reveley, a compromise was struck which preserved the existence of the Board of Morticians, but added seats for non-morticians, increased consumer protections in the funeral industry, and prohibited any state agency from requiring embalming absent an actual risk to the public health. In particular, Reveley challenged the pervasive use of expensive embalming when a more inexpensive alternative, refrigeration, was available.

As momentum gained nationwide to regulate the funeral industry, the Federal Trade Commission proposed new federal regulation of funeral homes. Reveley testified on February 13, 1980 before the Subcommittee on Oversight and Investigations of the United States House Committee on Interstate and Foreign Commerce where he explained his training in the mortuary industry had been "a scientific approach to exploiting the condition of the bereaved." In 1981, Reveley appeared on the Phil Donahue Show where he debated with the president of the National Funeral Director's Association and an FTC commissioner on package pricing in the funeral industry. On July 20, 1982, Reveley testified again about coercive and predatory practices in the funeral industry, this time before the Subcommittee on Housing and Consumer Interests of the United States House Permanent Select Committee on Aging. Finally, in 1984, the Federal Trade Commission enacted the Funeral Rule, designed to protect consumers by requiring that funeral providers and morticians give adequate information concerning the goods and services they offer, show consumers price lists before finalizing sales, and allow consumers to choose which funeral goods and services they want.

In response to his activism, Reveley received death threats and drew the ire of the entire industry. The Texas Funeral Directors Association and its members put pressure on Texas newspapers to stay publication of articles about him. He was regularly disparaged in funeral trade publications, but a jury awarded him $120,000 for defamation after Reveley sued the publisher of the Mortuary Management Magazine following their publication of one such article that was highly critical of him. Although he won his libel suit against the publisher, a federal judge set aside the jury-awarded defamation damages on appeal.
