= Davison M. Douglas =

American historian and jurist

21st Dean of William & Mary Law School
- In office July 1, 2009 – May 18, 2020
- Preceded by: W. Taylor Reveley III
- Succeeded by: A. Benjamin Spencer

Personal details
- Born: Davison McDowell Douglas; September 16, 1956 (age 69) Charlotte, North Carolina, United States
- Spouse: Kathryn Urbonya
- Education: Princeton University (AB); Yale Divinity School (MAR); Yale Law School (JD); Yale University Graduate School (MA, MPhil, PhD)

Davison McDowell Douglas (born September 16, 1956) is an American historian and jurist. From 2009 to 2020, he served as dean of the oldest law school in the United States, William & Mary Law School in Williamsburg, Virginia, where he has served on the faculty since 1990.

== Early life and education ==
Douglas was born in Charlotte, North Carolina in 1956. He attended Princeton University, where he studied history; in 1976, he was on the Princeton team that finished second in the National Collegiate Rowing Championship.

He continued his education, received a Master of Arts focused on American legal history in 1980. In 1983, he earned a Master of Philosophy and Master of Arts in Religion and graduated from Yale Law School, after which he clerked for Judge Walter R. Mansfield of the United States Court of Appeals for the Second Circuit.

== Career ==
Douglas joined the faculty of William & Mary Law School in 1990. From 1997 to 2004, he was director of the school's nationally acclaimed Institute of Bill of Rights Law. In 2005, he co-founded the William & Mary Election Law Program as part of a joint venture with the National Center for State Courts. After Taylor Reveley stepped down from his position as law dean to assume the presidency of the College, Douglas was appointed to replace him.

Academic offices
Preceded by W. Taylor Reveley III	Dean of William & Mary Law School; 2009–2020	Succeeded by A. Benjamin Spencer
