= Institute of Bill of Rights Law =

Research center at the William & Mary School of Law

Coordinates: 37°15′54.9″N 76°42′18.2″W

Moot Court at the 20th annual Supreme Court Preview on September 14, 2007

The Institute of Bill of Rights Law (IBRL), founded in 1982, is a center for the study of constitutional law at the William & Mary School of Law in Williamsburg, Virginia, United States. The IBRL focuses on enhancing a scholarly understanding of the nation's Bill of Rights by hosting an annual "Supreme Court Preview" that brings together constitutional and legal experts from law schools in the United States, as well as reporters and affiliates from the nation's news outlets. It also enables research fellows to conduct constitutional research with law professors at the law school, and co-sponsors the Constitutional Conflicts book series with Duke University Law School. The Institute of Bill of Rights Law sponsors events such as Constitutional Originalism debates and various symposiums.

== Supreme Court Previews ==
The 20th annual Supreme Court Preview, sponsored by the IBRL, was held September 14–15, 2007, at the Marshall-Wythe School of Law. Speakers included Erwin Chemerinsky, Walter E. Dellinger III, John Yoo, Michael W. McConnell, Linda Greenhouse, Dahlia Lithwick, Stuart Taylor Jr., Ted Cruz and William & Mary's own William Van Alstyne. A September 15 panel on the Roberts Court (with Chemerinsky, Yoo and Greenhouse) was aired on C-SPAN.

The 21st annual Supreme Court Preview was held September 26–27, 2008, again at William & Mary's Law School. Panelists included appellate judges from the Sixth, Seventh, Ninth and Tenth Circuits; journalists from CNN, The New York Times, USA Today and The Los Angeles Times; and Supreme Court advocates and U.S. legal scholars.

The 22nd annual Supreme Court Preview was held October 2–3, 2009, at William & Mary School of Law. Sandra Day O'Connor, Justice of the U.S. Supreme Court (retired) and Chancellor of The College of William & Mary, was the distinguished guest. Panelists included Beth Brinkman (Deputy Assistant Attorney General), Erwin Chemerinsky (Dean, University of California, Irvine School of Law), two former Solicitors General of the United States, and journalists and law professors from all over the nation.

The 23rd annual Supreme Court Preview was held September 24–25, 2010. In addition to reviewing the Supreme Court's forthcoming docket, panels were held on Perry v. Schwarzenegger, the same-sex marriage case then on appeal before the 9th Circuit Court of Appeals and on the constitutionality of the recently passed health insurance mandate. Panelists included four former Solicitors General, Jeffrey Sutton (U.S. Court of Appeals for the Sixth Circuit), law professors from Yale Law School and Stanford Law School, and Supreme Court correspondents for five national publications.

The 25th annual Supreme Court Preview was held September 28–29, 2012. The moot court case was Fisher v. The University of Texas at Austin, argued by Erwin Chemerinsky and Amy Wax (University of Pennsylvania Law School). Other panel topics included Gay Rights, Business Law, and Election Law. Participants included Debo P. Adegbile (NAACP), Joan Biskupic (Reuters), Michael Carvin (Jones Day), Walter Dellinger (O'Melveny & Myers), Linda Greenhouse (Yale Law School), Neal Katyal (Hogan Lovells), and Adam Liptak (New York Times).

== Leadership ==
The director of the IBRL is currently Neal E. Devins, Goodrich Professor of Law at William & Mary. Past directors include Davison M. Douglas (Arthur B. Hanson Professor of Law at Marshall-Wythe) and Gene Nichol.
