= Indira Etwaroo =

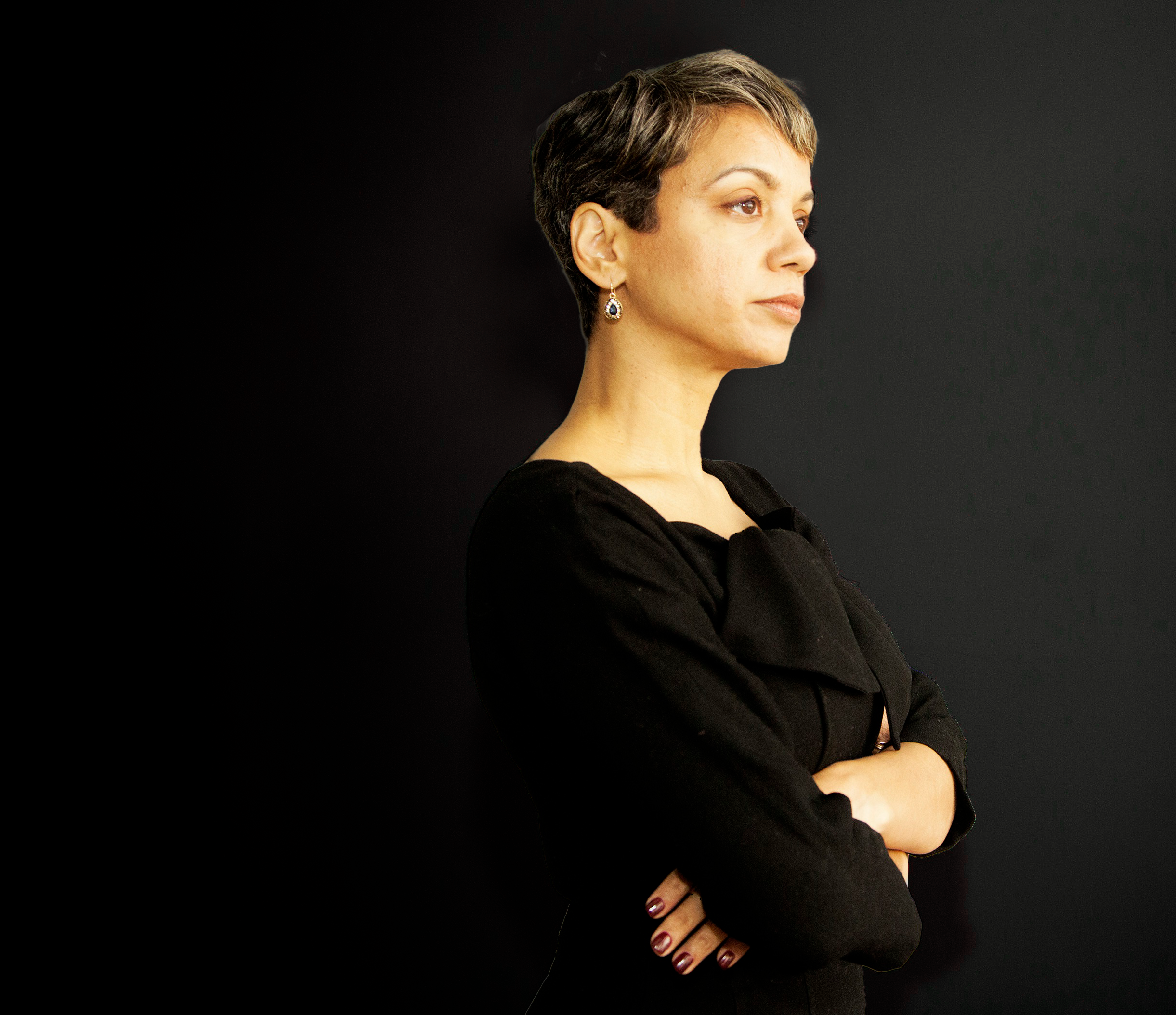
Indira Etwaroo

Indira Etwaroo is a producer, director, scholar and arts and culture executive.

Etwaroo was announced as the new Artistic Director and CEO of the New York cultural institution Harlem Stage in June 2024, which supports new work by artists of color from around the world. Prior to that appointment, she served as the Inaugural director of the Steve Jobs Theater at Apple in Cupertino, California, driving the venue's strategy for global partnerships and live events and developing original multi-platform content.

Prior to that appointment, Etwaroo led the Off-Broadway Billie Holiday Theatre in Brooklyn, as its executive artistic director, awarded the Presidential Medal of the Arts during her last year as its executive leader. She also led the efforts to create the first black lives matter mural in NY in partnership with Council Member Robert Cornegy with artists Dawud West and Cey Adams and the commemorative book in 2020 photographed by Hollis King in response to the racially motivated violence against black people in the U.S. and across the world. She produced and directed a live and online performance with 12 Angry Men…and Women: The Weight of the Wait as the first Equity-approved live event in the nation during COVID, with artists Wendell Pierce, Lisa Arrindell, Billy Eugene Jones, Marsha Stephanie Blake and Daniel Bernard Roumain to call out police brutality.

She launched signature programming at the Billie, including 50in50: Writing Ourselves Into Existence, with curatorial statements provided by MacArthur Genius Dominique Morriseau, which presented the writings of over one thousand black women writers-to-date from across the world, as well as the Black Arts Institute, a training program at The Billie in partnership with Stella Adler Studio of Acting.

Etwaroo was the founding executive producer of The Greene Space in NYC, where she conceptualized the first-of-its kind multi-platform venue and team in 2009 to bring live, on-air and online video content to audiences. She was also Founding Executive Producer and Director of NPR Presents, the global live events platform where she developed The Race Card Project, an initiative created by NPR host and journalist Michelle Norris and the seven-city National Water+ Tour, directed by Kenny Leon. Of note, she Executive Produced the American Broadcast Premiere of the 75th Anniversary of Zora Neal's Hurston's Their Eyes Were Watching God, starring Phylicia Rashad and the first-ever audio recordings and video broadcasts of August Wilson's entire American Century Cycle, in partnership with the August Wilson Estate and artistic directors Ruben Santiago-Hudson and Stephen McKinley Henderson. Etwaroo's work at BAM, her first foray into the nonprofit world of arts and culture, developed educational and humanities' content that leveraged BAM's MainStage work. Indira first began her professional career as an elementary school teacher, teaching arts and culture to underrepresented communities in Tegucigalpa, Honduras and Richmond, Virginia.

Etwaroo's served on the advisory committee with the Doris Duke Charitable Trust and The New York Community Trust to understand the health and viability of African, Latinx, Asian, Arab, and Native American (ALAANA) arts groups in New York City to create the Mosaic Network and Fund. Etwaroo led the efforts for the strategic design of the first-ever national strategic initiative for black theaters, The Black Seed, and brought in arts leaders Gary Anderson of Plowshare Theater (Detroit), Monica NDounou of The Craft Institute (Boston) and Shay Wafer of WACO Theater (LA) to serve as inaugural national advisors. Etwaroo raised $10.5 Million dollars that was invested into the black theater field from 2021-2023. She also served as the Executive Advisor to the Chadwick Boseman Estate to help shape their foundational work and was appointed to the NYC COVID Mayoral Task Force with Mayor DeBlasio in 2020.

Etwaroo has been a professor of graduate and professional studies at Temple University and at NYU, designing and teaching Research Methods; Dance, Movement and Pluralism; and Leading Performing Arts Institutions in the 21st Century. She has published and lectured about the transformative power of the arts to create greater equity and institutional thrivability. Publications include, Our Open Casket to the World: Black Lives Matter Bed-Stuy 2020; A New World Awaits Us, co-authored with Kenny Leon (American Theater Magazine, 2020); Dance Rooted in the Movements of Bedford-Stuyvesant: Two Choreographers, One Aesthetic Tradition In Hot Feet and Social Change: African Dance and Diaspora Communities, Eds. Kariamu Welsh, Esailama G. A. Diouf, and Yvonne Daniel with a Foreword by Thomas F. DeFrantz, Danny Glover, and Harry Belafonte (Illinois University Press, 2019) and I Hope…:Lessons Learned by a Black Woman Cultural Leader in 2020, Grantmakers in the Arts, 2023.

Etwaroo has been acknowledged with awards and honors for her work, including serving as a Fulbright scholar where she lived and worked with refugee Somali women in Addis Ababa, Ethiopia in 2003-2004, the Inaugural Black Theatre United Advocacy Award, American Composers Orchestra's Creative Catalyst Award, the “40 Under 40” of national leaders by The Network Journal in 2009, the Black Theater Network's Larry Leon Hamlin Legacy Award, and the Larry Leon Hamlin Producer's Award from the National Black Theater Festival.

Etwaroo received her BME from Longwood University in Classical Flute Performance; an MA in dance education from Temple University, and her PhD in cultural studies with a focus on dance, narrative and African aesthetics from Temple University with a concentration in women's studies.

== Early life and education ==
Etwaroo performed at the National Black Theatre Festival in 1995 and 1997, as part of the Jazz Actors Theater Repertory Ensemble directed by Ernie McClintock whom she also studied directing under. In 2003, Etwaroo worked for a year in Addis Ababa, Ethiopia as a Fulbright scholar where she collaborated with a group of refugee Somali women and children "to explore the performance traditions that surround the controversial practice of female genital cutting." For her endeavors, Etwaroo received the Emerging Doctoral Scholar Award and the Graduate Research Award from the National Congress on Research in Dance.
