= A. Benjamin Spencer =

American legal scholar and academic administrator

22nd Dean of William & Mary Law School
- Incumbent
- Assumed office July 1, 2020
- Preceded by: Davison M. Douglas

Personal details
- Born: Adam Benjamin Spencer Atlanta, Georgia, U.S.
- Education: Morehouse College (BA); London School of Economics (MSc); Harvard Law School (JD)

Military service
- Branch/service: United States Army; Army Reserve
- Rank: Major
- Unit: J.A.G. Corps

Adam Benjamin Spencer, a scholar of civil procedure and federal jurisdiction, became the Chancellor Professor of Law and Dean of William & Mary Law School in Williamsburg, Virginia, on July 1, 2020, and was awarded the Marshall-Wythe School of Law Trustee Professorship the following year. He is the first Black dean of any school at William & Mary.

== Publications ==
Spencer is the author of multiple volumes of the Wright & Miller Federal Practice & Procedure treatise, in addition to numerous articles published in journals including the Michigan Law Review, the University of Chicago Law Review, the Harvard Law Review and the UCLA Law Review.

== Military Service & Public Appointments ==
Spencer is a veteran, having served as a member of the U.S. Army Reserve Judge Advocate General's Corps as a major before completing his term of service. In 2017, U.S. Supreme Court Chief Justice John Roberts appointed him to the U.S. Judicial Conference Advisory Committee on Civil Rules.

== Career ==
Prior to becoming Dean of William & Mary Law School, Spencer served on the faculty at the University of Virginia School of Law, first as the Earle K. Shawe Professor of Law (2014–2017), as a professor of law (2017–2018), and as the Justice Thurgood Marshall Distinguished Professor of Law (2018–2020). During the 2019–2020 academic year, he was the Bennett Boskey Visiting professor of law at Harvard Law School as well as a Visiting Professor at the University of Chicago School of Law.

Spencer previously served as professor, associate dean for research and director of the Frances Lewis Law Center at Washington and Lee University School of Law. He is a member of the American Law Institute, a member of the West Academic Law School Advisory Board, and a member of the British Ambassador's Advisory Council. He formerly served on the Virginia State Bar Council and has served as a special assistant U.S. attorney for the Western District of Virginia.

Prior to joining the Washington and Lee faculty, Spencer was an associate professor of law at the University of Richmond School of Law. He also formerly worked as an associate in the law firm Shearman & Sterling and as a law clerk to Judge Judith W. Rogers of the U.S. Court of Appeals for the D.C. Circuit.

== Education & Awards ==
Spencer holds a B.A. from Morehouse College, having graduated summa cum laude as class valedictorian, a J.D. from Harvard Law School where he served as Articles Editor of the Harvard Law Review, and a Master of Science from the London School of Economics, where he was a Marshall Scholar.

In 2007, Spencer was awarded the Virginia State Council of Higher Education “Rising Star” award, given to the most promising junior faculty member among all academic fields at all colleges and universities in Virginia. He was the first law professor to receive this award.

In June 2022, Spencer was honored with the William R. Rakes Leadership in Education Award from the Virginia State Bar (VSB) Section on the Education of Lawyers in Virginia. In January 2025, Spencer was inducted as a Fellow of the Virginia Bar Foundation.

== Family history ==
Spencer is the son of James R. Spencer, the first African American federal judge in Virginia and the first African American chief judge of the U.S. District Court for the Eastern District of Virginia. His mother, Alicia Spencer, is a retired elementary school principal in Newport News. His grandfather, Dr. Adam S. Arnold, was the first African American professor at Notre Dame University.
