= W. Taylor Reveley IV =

American lawyer and academic administrator

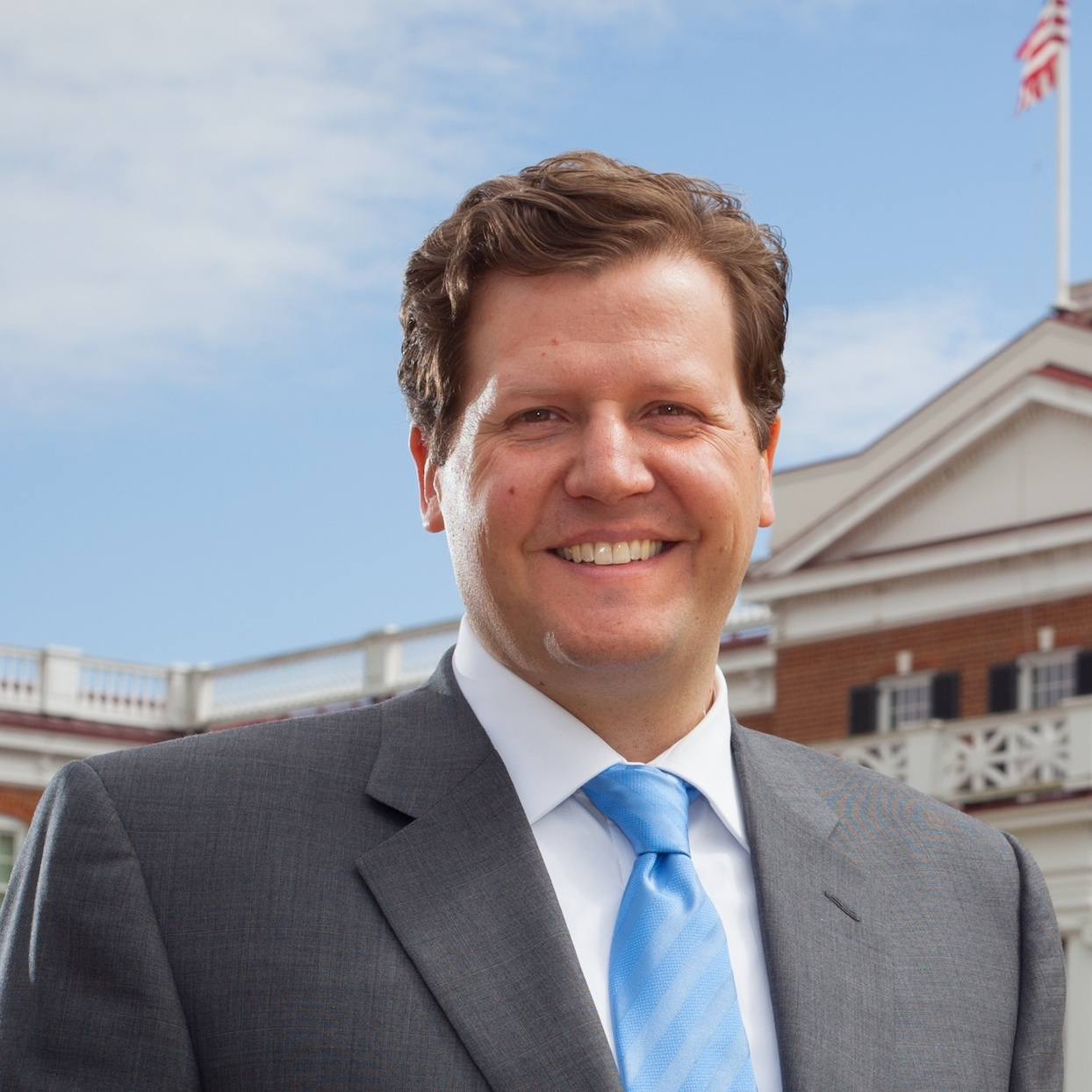

26th President of Longwood University
- Incumbent
- Assumed office June 1, 2013
- Preceded by: Patrick Finnegan

Personal details
- Born: August 16, 1974 (age 52) Richmond, Virginia, U.S.
- Spouse: Marlo Reveley
- Education: Princeton University (A.B.); Union Presbyterian Seminary (M.Div.); University of Virginia (J.D.)
- Profession: Educator, Attorney

Walter Taylor Reveley IV (born August 16, 1974) is a Virginia educator and lawyer who became the 26th president of Longwood University, a public liberal arts college in Farmville, Virginia, in 2013. A scholar of the U.S. presidency, Reveley was previously the managing director of the University of Virginia's Miller Center, and as the coordinating attorney for the National War Powers Commission, co-chaired by U.S. Secretaries of State James Baker and Warren Christopher.

== Early life and education ==
Reveley is a native of Richmond, Virginia, and graduated from St. Christopher's School there. He graduated with an A.B. in classics from Princeton University in 1996 after completing an 82-page-long senior thesis, titled "The Classical Influence on James Madison's Political Thought up to and through the Ratification of the United States Constitution", under the supervision of Donna Hurley. While a student at Princeton, Reveley was a member of the football team. He also holds a master's degree from Union Presbyterian Seminary, and a J.D. from the University of Virginia School of Law.

Reveley's grandfather, W. Taylor Reveley II was president of Hampden-Sydney College from 1963-1977, and his father W. Taylor Reveley III was president of the College of William & Mary from 2008-2018.

== Career ==
Reveley began his career as an attorney with Hunton & Williams, with a practice focused on corporate governance, securities, and mergers and acquisitions, as well as matters of state and federal public policy.

Reveley's scholarly expertise is the modern U.S. presidency in particular, the major focus of U.Va.’s Miller Center, which he helped lead under former Virginia Governor Gerald Baliles.

Previously, Reveley was on the Princeton Alumni Council's executive committee and was chairman of the trustees of Virginia Intermont College.

He is also an executive producer of the 2013 dark comedy Doomsdays, written and directed by his childhood friend Eddie Mullins, which receives 86% positive reviews on Rotten Tomatoes.

=== Longwood ===
The Commission on Presidential Debates selected Longwood to host the October 2016 U.S. Vice-Presidential Debate.

Reveley led a campus plan with the firm Cooper, Robertson & Partners, which aims to improve the university's residential campus and connection to the town of Farmville.
