= W. Taylor Reveley III =

American lawyer and academic administrator

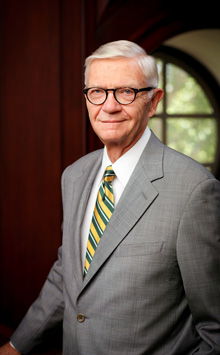

27th President of the College of William & Mary
- In office September 5, 2008 – June 30, 2018
- Preceded by: Gene Nichol
- Succeeded by: Katherine Rowe

20th Dean of William & Mary Law School
- In office August 1998 – February 2008
- Preceded by: Thomas G. Krattenmaker
- Succeeded by: Davison M. Douglas

Personal details
- Born: Walter Taylor Reveley III; January 6, 1943 (age 83) Churchville, Virginia, U.S.
- Spouse: Helen Martin Bond
- Children: Walter Taylor IV, George Everett Bond, Nelson Martin Eason, Helen Lanier
- Parent: W. Taylor Reveley II (father)
- Education: Princeton University (BA); University of Virginia (JD)
- Profession: Lawyer and Educator

Walter Taylor Reveley III (born January 6, 1943) is an American legal scholar and former lawyer. He served as the twenty-seventh president of the College of William & Mary. Formerly Dean of its law school from August 1998 to February 2008, Reveley was appointed interim president of William & Mary on February 12, 2008, following Gene Nichol's resignation earlier that day, and was elected the university's 27th president by the Board of Visitors on September 5, 2008. While president, Reveley continued his service as the John Stewart Bryan Professor of Jurisprudence at the law school.

Reveley's areas of academic specialty include the constitutional division of authority between the President and Congress over the use of American armed force abroad, administrative and energy law, and the role of the citizen lawyer. He is the author of the 1981 book War Powers of the President and Congress: Who Holds the Arrows and the Olive Branch?. He co-directed the National War Powers Commission in 2007–09.

== Career ==
Reveley graduated with an A.B. in politics from Princeton University in 1965 after completing a senior thesis titled "Between North and South: The United Nations Conference on Trade and Development." He then received his J.D. from the University of Virginia Law School in 1968. He has honorary doctorates from Hampden-Sydney College, King University and the College of William & Mary. He is a member of Phi Beta Kappa, Order of the Coif, and ODK.

Reveley was an assistant professor of law at the University of Alabama in 1968–69. He clerked for Justice William J. Brennan at the United States Supreme Court in 1969–70. In 1972–73, he studied the war powers as a Fellow of the Woodrow Wilson International Center for Scholars in Washington, D.C., and an International Affairs Fellow of the Council of Foreign Relations in New York City.

Before joining William & Mary, Reveley practiced law for almost three decades at Hunton & Williams, specializing in energy and environmental matters, especially regarding commercial nuclear power. He was the managing partner of the firm for nine years during a time of significant growth in its national and international reach.

Reveley has served on many cultural and educational boards, including those of Princeton University, Union Presbyterian Seminary, St. Christopher's School, the Andrew W. Mellon Foundation, the Presbyterian Church (USA) Foundation, the Oak Spring Garden Foundation, the Carnegie Endowment for International Peace, JSTOR, the Richmond Symphony, the Virginia Museum of Fine Arts, the Virginia Historical Society, and the Virginia Foundation for the Humanities.

Three Successive generations of the Reveley family have been presidents of schools in Virginia. Reveley's father, W. Taylor Reveley II, was president of Hampden-Sydney College from 1963 to 1977. His son, W. Taylor Reveley IV, became president of Longwood University in March 2013.

Reveley retired as William & Mary's president on June 30, 2018. He was succeeded by Katherine Rowe, the first woman to lead William & Mary since its founding in 1693.

== See also ==
- List of law clerks for the third seat of the Supreme Court of the United States

Academic offices
Preceded by Thomas G. Krattenmaker	Dean of the College of William & Mary Law School; 1998–2008	Succeeded by Davison M. Douglas
