= William & Mary Law School =

Public law school in Williamsburg, Virginia, US

- Seal of the school
- Parent school: College of William & Mary
- Established: 1779; 247 years ago
- School type: Public law school
- Endowment: $101.3 million
- Parent endowment: $1.5 billion
- Dean: A. Benjamin Spencer
- Location: Williamsburg, Virginia, U.S. 37°15′55″N 76°42′18″W
- Enrollment: 606
- Faculty: 44 (full–time); 118 (part–time)
- USNWR ranking: 31st (tie) (2025)
- Bar pass rate: 83.63% (2024 first-time takers)
- Website: law.wm.edu
- ABA profile: ABA Profile

William & Mary Law School, formally the Marshall-Wythe School of Law, is the law school of the College of William & Mary, a public research university in Williamsburg, Virginia. It is the oldest extant law school in the United States, having been founded in 1779 at the urging of William & Mary alumnus Thomas Jefferson. (Note: Litchfield Law School in Litchfield, Connecticut began offering formal legal education five years prior to William & Mary.) As of 2023, it has an enrollment of 606 full-time students seeking a Juris Doctor (J.D.) or a Master of Laws (LL.M.) in the American legal system, a two or three semester program for lawyers trained outside the United States.

== History ==
=== 18th century ===
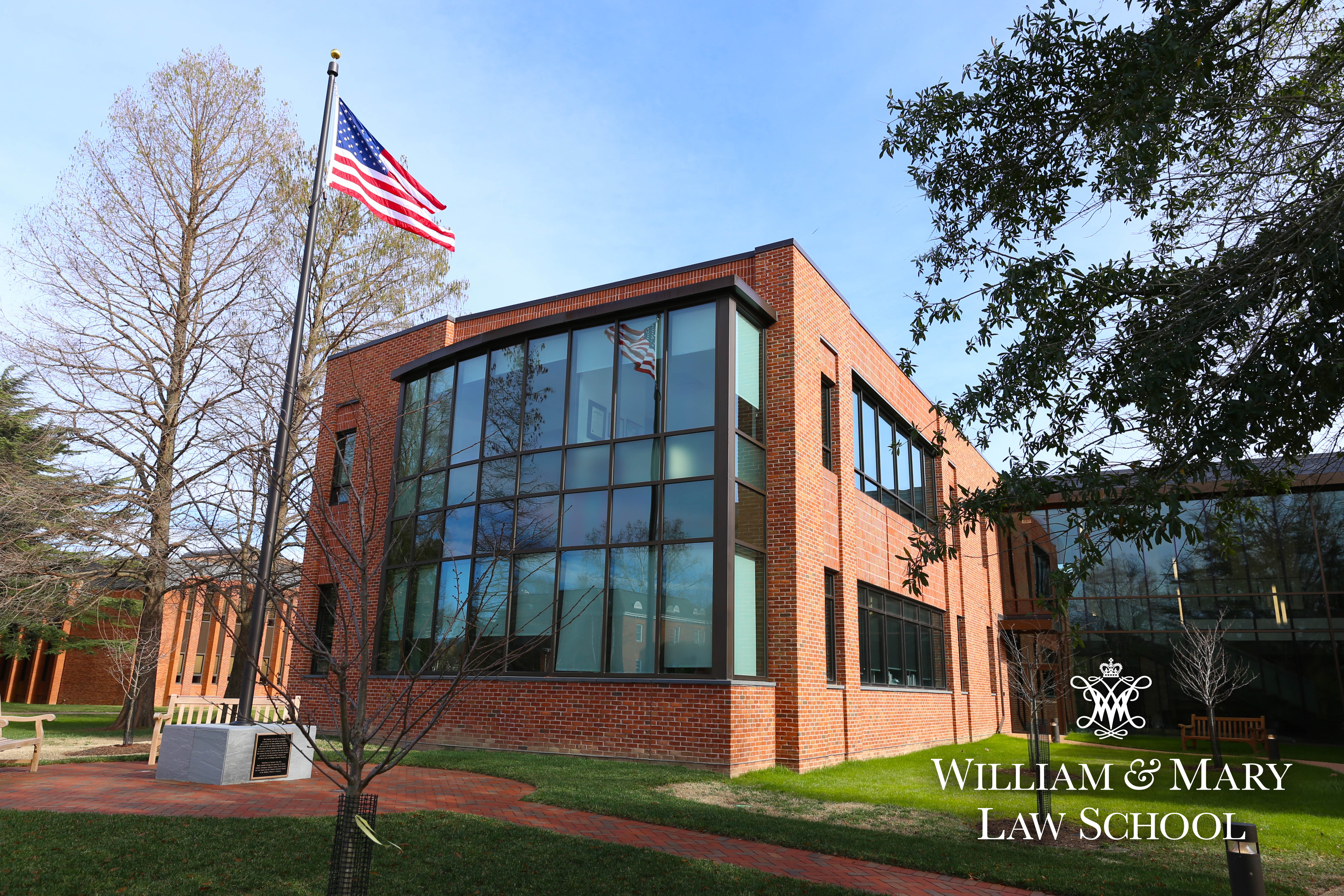
William & Mary Law School Building, opened in 1980

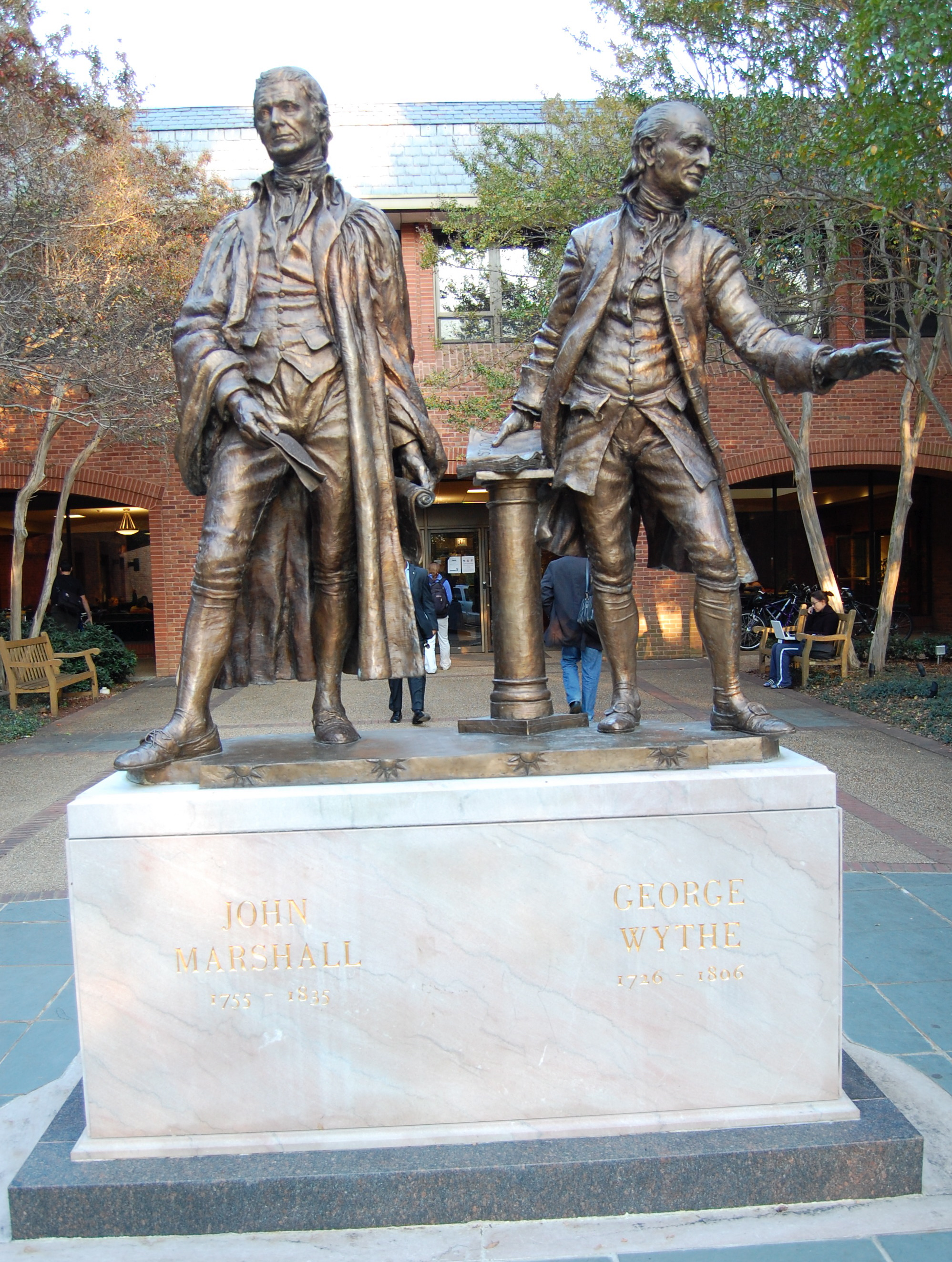
A statue of John Marshall and George Wythe at the entry to the William & Mary School of Law

William & Mary Law School was founded in 1779 at the impetus of Virginia Governor Thomas Jefferson, an alumnus of the university, during the reorganization of the originally royal institution, transforming the College of William & Mary into the first university in the United States. At Jefferson's urging, the governing board of visitors of William & Mary established a chair of law and appointed George Wythe, a signer of the Declaration of Independence, delegate to the Philadelphia Convention, and Justice of the Supreme Court of Virginia, its first holder. (In the English-speaking world, older law professorships include the chair at Oxford University, first held by William Blackstone, the chair at Edinburgh University's School of Law (1709), and the Regius Chair of Law at Glasgow University).

=== 19th century ===
Before filling the chair of law at William & Mary, Wythe tutored numerous students in the subject, including Thomas Jefferson and James Monroe. John Marshall, who became Chief Justice of the United States in 1801, received his only formal legal education when he attended Wythe's lectures at William & Mary in 1780. St. George Tucker, who succeeded Wythe as Professor of Law in 1790 and edited the seminal early American edition of Blackstone's Commentaries, also was one of Wythe's students.

The growth of the school was halted abruptly by the beginning of the American Civil War. The start of military campaigns on the Virginia Peninsula compelled William & Mary to close its doors. It would be another sixty years before the historical priority in law could be revived in a modern program that is nearly ninety years old.

=== 20th century ===
After William & Mary Law School was reopened early in 1921, it was moved around the main campus of the university to several different buildings in succession. In 1980, the school was moved to the outskirts of Colonial Williamsburg, a short distance from the main campus. The building has been renovated several times since 1980, with the addition of a new wing of classrooms and renovation of older classrooms in 2000, the opening of the Henry C. Wolf Law Library, the construction of a new admission suite, and the addition of the James A. and Robin L. Hixon Center for Experiential Learning and Leadership (dedicated in 2017).

=== 21st century ===
A. Benjamin Spencer, a nationally renowned civil procedure and federal courts expert and former professor of law at the University of Virginia, is the dean and Chancellor Professor at William & Mary Law School. Named on July 1, 2020, he is William & Mary's first African-American dean of any school at the university, including the law school. W. Taylor Reveley III, formerly managing partner of the law firm of Hunton & Williams, is a former dean of the law school. Reveley left the law school to become the 27th president of William & Mary (serving from 2008 to 2018). Davison M. Douglas was dean of the law school from 2009 until 2020. The former chancellor of William & Mary, Sandra Day O'Connor, delivered commencement remarks to the graduating class of the school in 2006, 2008 and 2010.

== Admissions ==
For the Class of 2025 (enrolled as of October 1, 2022), the median undergraduate GPA was 3.75 and the median LSAT score was 165.

== Ranking ==
University rankings

Global – Overall
- QS World: 1001-1200 (2026)

In 2025, William & Mary Law tied for 31st in the U.S. News & World Report law school rankings. In 2024, W&M law tied for 36th place. It had been ranked tied for the 30th place in its 2023 rankings.

== Bar examination passage ==
In 2024, the overall bar examination passage rate for the law school’s first-time examination takers was 83.63%.

== Employment ==
According to William & Mary's official 2022 ABA-required disclosures, 77.65% of the Class of 2022 obtained full-time, long-term, JD–required employment (i.e., employed as attorneys) while 92% obtained either JD–required or JD–advantaged non-school funded long–term employment nine months after graduation. William & Mary's Law School Transparency under-employment score is 10%, indicating the percentage of the Class of 2022 unemployed, pursuing an additional degree, or working in a non-professional, short-term, or part-time job nine months after graduation, with 0% of the class in school-funded jobs.

== Programs ==
- William & Mary Law School offers institutes and programs such as the Center for Racial & Social Justice, the Coastal Policy Center, the Center for Comparative Legal Studies and Post-Conflict Peacebuilding, the Center for Legal and Court Technology, the Center for the Study of Law and Markets, the Dunn Civil Liberties Project, the Election Law Program, the Human Security Law Center, the Institute of Bill of Rights Law, and the Property Rights Project.
- The annual Supreme Court Preview of the Institute of Bill of Rights Law brings journalists and academics together each fall for an analysis of key cases on the Court's docket for the new term.
- William & Mary Law School has several Clinics for students to work under the supervision of attorneys, ranging in areas of practice. The Clinics offered include the Appellate and Supreme Court Clinic, Domestic Violence Clinic, Elder Law and Disability Clinic, Federal Tax Clinic, Immigration Clinic, Innocence Project Clinic, Lewis J. Puller Veterans' Benefits Clinic, and Special Education Advocacy Clinic. The Lewis B. Puller, Jr. Veteran's Benefits Clinic provides students (under the supervision of staff attorneys) with the opportunity to ensure that veterans receive the benefits which they are entitled to as a matter of law and service.
- Journals include the William & Mary Law Review, the Bill of Rights Journal, William & Mary Environmental Law and Policy Review, William & Mary Journal of Race, Gender, and Social Justice, the William & Mary Business Law Review, and the Brigham–Kanner Property Rights Journal.
- The school's McGlothlin Courtroom is home to the Center for Legal and Court Technology, a joint program of the School and the National Center for State Courts. The mission of the project is to use technology to improve the administration of justice and the legal systems of the world.
- Created in 2005 as a joint venture of the National Center for State Courts and the Law School, the Election Law Program was intended to provide practical assistance to state court judges in the United States who are called upon to resolve difficult election law disputes. It has since been expanded to include a student Election Law Society.
- The George Wythe Society of Citizen Lawyers is a civic leadership program, formed in the fall of 2005, to recognize and encourage community service and civic participation by members of the student body.
- The Human Rights and National Security Law Program focuses on the interplay between national defense and the protection of civil rights. The Program's Distinguished Lecture Series and co-sponsored symposia bring experts to campus each semester to foster discussion and debate about on-going and emerging issues.
- The Center for the Study of Law and Markets seeks to advance the understanding of the role of legal institutions in promoting well-functioning markets in a free society.
- The Center for Comparative Legal Studies and Post-Conflict Peacebuilding bridges the gap between resources available at academic institutions and the need for them in the field by rule of law actors engaged in post-conflict reconstruction efforts. The Center serves as a focal point for the law school's international and comparative legal and policy research and programming and sponsors summer international internships in developing and post-conflict countries around the world.
- The Institute of Bill of Rights Law engages in study of the Bill of Rights and sponsors a variety of lectures, conferences, and publications to examine Constitutional issues, including the annual Supreme Court Preview.
- The William & Mary Property Rights Project encourages scholarly study of the role that property rights play in society. The Project's annual Brigham–Kanner Property Rights Conference explores recent developments in areas such as takings litigation and takings law.

== Cost of attendance ==
Tuition at William & Mary for the 2023-24 academic year is $36,418 for Virginia residents and $58,604 for non-residents. Approximately 97% of students received financial aid (2022). Law School Transparency estimated debt-financed cost of attendance for three years, based on data from the 2022-2023 academic year, is $179,472 for residents; the estimated cost for non-residents is $232,692.

== Notable alumni ==
- Michele Bachmann (LL.M., 1988), U.S. House of Representatives, Minnesota (2007–2015)
- John L. Brownlee (Law 1994), U.S. Attorney for the Western District of Virginia
- Ronald L. Buckwalter (Law 1962), judge of the United States District Court for the Eastern District of Pennsylvania (1990–2003)
- William H. Cabell (Law 1793), received first baccalaureate in law granted in America, governor of Virginia (1805–1808), justice of the Supreme Court of Virginia (1811–1851)
- Eric Cantor (Law 1988), U.S. House of Representatives, Virginia (2001–2014); House Majority Leader of 112th Congress, 2011
- Glen E. Conrad (Law 1974), judge of the United States District Court for the Western District of Virginia (2003–2017), chief judge (2010–2017)
- Clifton L. Corker (Law 1993), Judge of the United States District Court for the Eastern District of Tennessee
- Thomas Cullen (Law 2004), Judge of the United States District Court for the Western District of Virginia, former United States Attorney for the Western District of Virginia
- Ted Dalton (Law 1926), judge of the United States District Court for the Western District of Virginia (1959–1976), chief judge (1960–1971)
- Powhatan Ellis (Law 1814), United States Senator from Mississippi; Judge of the United States District Court for the District of Mississippi
- Lizzie Fletcher (Law 2006), U.S. House of Representatives, Texas (2019–present)
- Matt Gaetz (Law 2007), U.S. House of Representatives, Florida (2017–2024)
- Gurbir Grewal (Law 1999), Attorney General of New Jersey
- D. Arthur Kelsey (Law 1985), justice, Supreme Court of Virginia
- Jerry W. Kilgore (Law 1986), Attorney General of Virginia (2001–2005)
- Gregory LoGerfo (Law 1999), U.S. ambassador and diplomat
- James Murray Mason (Law 1820), member of the U.S. House of Representatives (1837–1839); United States Senator from Virginia (1847–1861)
- John Marshall, 4th Chief Justice of the United States
- Haldane Robert Mayer (Law 1971), judge of the U.S. Court of Appeals for the Federal Circuit (1987–present; chief judge of the Federal Circuit, 1997–2004)
- LeRoy Francis Millette, Jr. (William & Mary 1971, Law 1974), justice Supreme Court of Virginia (2009–present )
- Jason Miyares (Law 2005), Attorney General of Virginia; former member of Virginia House of Delegates.
- Lewis Burwell Puller, Jr. (William & Mary 1967, Law 1974), Vietnam veteran (Lt., USMC (Silver Star, two Purple Hearts, the Navy Commendation Medal and the Vietnam Cross of Gallantry) and Pulitzer Prize winning author. The William & Mary Law School's Veteran's Benefit Clinic is named after him.
- Steve Salbu (JD), dean emeritus of the Scheller College of Business at the Georgia Institute of Technology (2006–2014).
- Robert E. Scott (Law 1968), law professor at Columbia Law School, dean of University of Virginia Law School (1991–2001), and fellow of the American Academy of Arts and Sciences.
- Rebecca Beach Smith, (William & Mary 1971, Law 1979), Chief District Judge of the United States District Court for the Eastern District of Virginia (2011–2018)
- Henry St. George Tucker (William & Mary 1798, Law 1801), professor of law at William & Mary (1801–1804), justice of the Supreme Court of Virginia (1824–1831), remembered for editing the American edition of Blackstone's Commentaries.
- G. Zachary Terwilliger (Law 2007), U.S. Attorney, Eastern District of Virginia
- Jessica Aber (Law 2006), U.S. Attorney for Eastern District of Virginia.
- Jennifer Wexton (Law 1995), U.S. House of Representatives, Virginia (2019–2025)
- Susan Davis Wigenton (Law 1987), District Judge, United States District Court for the District of New Jersey, (2006–present)

== Notable faculty members ==
- Angela M. Banks
- Lan Cao
- Davison M. Douglas
- Mitchell Reiss
- W. Taylor Reveley III
- William Spong Jr.
- St. George Tucker
- William W. Van Alstyne
- George Wythe

== Law journals ==
- William & Mary Law Review
- William & Mary Bill of Rights Journal
- William & Mary Environmental Law and Policy Review
- William & Mary Journal of Race, Gender, and Social Justice, previously the William & Mary Journal of Women and the Law
- William & Mary Business Law Review
- Brigham-Kanner Property Rights Journal

== See also ==
- I Am the College of William and Mary
- List of deans of the William & Mary Law School
