= National Register of Historic Places listings in Prince Edward County, Virginia =

Location of Prince Edward County in Virginia

This is a list of the National Register of Historic Places listings in Prince Edward County, Virginia.

This is intended to be a complete list of the properties and districts on the National Register of Historic Places in Prince Edward County, Virginia, United States. The locations of National Register properties and districts for which the latitude and longitude coordinates are included below, may be seen in an online map.

There are 16 properties and districts listed on the National Register in the county, including 2 National Historic Landmarks.

This National Park Service list is complete through NPS recent listings posted October 16, 2026.

== Current listings ==
	Name on the Register	Image	Date listed	Location	City or town	Description
1	Briery Church	Briery Church	November 29, 1969 (#69000371)	Northwest of the junction of U.S. Route 15 and Briery Rd. 37°05′23″N 78°28′44″W	Briery	
2	Buffalo Presbyterian Church	Buffalo Presbyterian Church	April 7, 1995 (#95000395)	Buffalo Church Rd., 0.3 miles (0.48 km) south of its junction with Five Forks Rd. 37°14′27″N 78°36′02″W	Pamplin	
3	Debtor's Prison	Debtor's Prison	September 22, 1972 (#72001412)	U.S. Route 15; 37°13′41″N 78°26′34″W	Worsham	
4	Falkland	Falkland	June 22, 1979 (#79003071)	Northwest of Meherrin on Falkland Rd. 37°07′52″N 78°24′30″W	Redd Shop	
5	Farmville Historic District	Farmville Historic District	October 30, 1989 (#89001822)	Roughly bounded by Main, Venable, High, Ely, and School Sts., 1st Ave., Irving St., 2nd Ave., Oak, W. 3rd, and Mill Sts. 37°18′06″N 78°23′48″W	Farmville	
6	First Baptist Church	First Baptist Church	February 27, 2013 (#13000046)	100 S. Main St. 37°18′03″N 78°23′35″W	Farmville	
7	Green Bay School		October 13, 2026 (#100013530)	140 Green Bay Road; 37°08′08″N 78°18′51″W	Green Bay	
8	Hampden-Sydney College Historic District	Hampden-Sydney College Historic District	February 26, 1970 (#70000822)	Bounded approximately by the Hampden-Sydney College campus 37°14′34″N 78°27′32″W	Hampden-Sydney	
9	High Bridge	High Bridge	September 12, 2008 (#08000875)	Appomattox River; 37°18′43″N 78°19′10″W	Farmville	Extends into Cumberland County
10	Longwood House	Longwood House	March 8, 1984 (#84003564)	Johnson Dr. 37°17′30″N 78°22′46″W	Farmville	
11	Robert Russa Moton Boyhood Home	Robert Russa Moton Boyhood Home	April 11, 2014 (#14000149)	4162 Lockett Rd., about 10 miles (16 km) from Rice; 37°19′26″N 78°16′10″W	Rice	
12	Robert Russa Moton High School	Robert Russa Moton High School	October 24, 1995 (#95001177)	Junction of S. Main St. and Griffin Boulevard; 37°17′29″N 78°23′52″W	Farmville	
13	Old Prince Edward County Clerk's Office	Old Prince Edward County Clerk's Office	September 10, 1979 (#79003072)	U.S. Route 15; 37°13′44″N 78°26′32″W	Worsham	
14	Sayler's Creek Battlefield	Sayler's Creek Battlefield	February 4, 1985 (#85002436)	Sayler's Creek, James Town, and Bunker Hill Rds. 37°19′55″N 78°14′48″W	Farmville	
15	Twin Lakes State Park	Twin Lakes State Park	October 31, 2012 (#12000906)	788 Twin Lakes Rd. 37°10′26″N 78°16′25″W	Green Bay	
16	Worsham High School	Worsham High School	June 24, 2010 (#10000384)	8832 Abilene Rd. 37°13′49″N 78°26′47″W	Farmville	

== See also ==
- List of National Historic Landmarks in Virginia
- National Register of Historic Places listings in Virginia
