= Blackberry Boogie =

Single by Tennessee Ernie Ford with Cliffie Stone's Orchestra
- B-side: "Tennessee Local"
- Released: 1952
- Genre: Country
- Label: Capitol
- Songwriter: Tennessee Ernie Ford

"Blackberry Boogie" is a song written by Tennessee Ernie Ford and performed by Ford with Cliffie Stone's Orchestra. Released on Capitol Records in September 1952, the song peaked in at No. 6 on the folk juke box chart and No. 9 on the folk best sellers chart.

The lyrics refer to picking blackberries when the sun comes up, filling his bucket right to the top. One of the berries says, "Don't pick me now, 'cause I ain't ripe dad!" He teturns to the blackberry patch with his girl at night, grabs for a kiss, and she sighs and suggests going back to his house to make a pie.

The sogn was also covered by The Four Lads, Johnnie Lee Wills and His Boys, Sid Phillips and His Band, Rusty Howard and the Bar-X Boys, and Delbert Barker.
