= El Monte Legion Stadium =

Indoor arena in California (1927–1974)

- The Pink Elephant
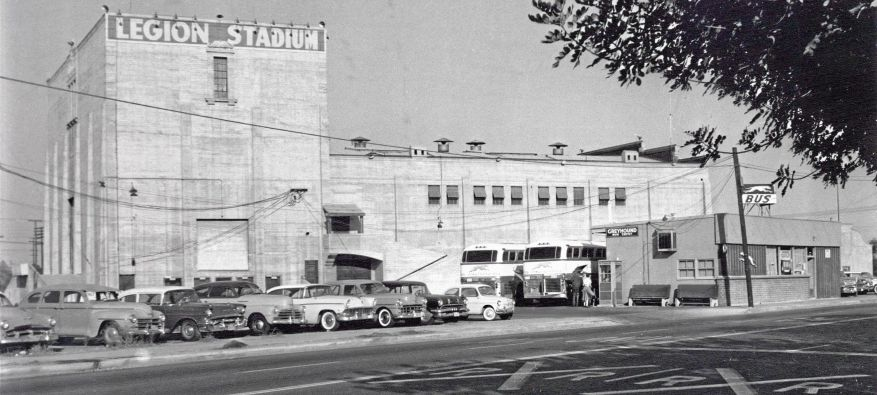
- El Monte Legion Stadium (c. mid-1950s)
- Former names: El Monte Union High School Auditorium; El Monte Auditorium; El Monte Gymnasium
- Address: 11151 Valley Boulevard; El Monte, California; United States
- Owner: El Monte Union High School District (1927–1945); American Legion, Post 261 (1945–1973); United States Postal Service (1973–1974)
- Capacity: 3,500
- Acreage: 2.49 acres

Construction
- Built: 1927
- Opened: 1928
- Renovated: 1945
- Closed: 1973
- Demolished: 1974
- Years active: 1928–1973
- Cost: $70,000 (c. $1,210,000 in 2023)
- General contractors: Thurman & Thurman

The El Monte Legion Stadium (also known as Legion Stadium, El Monte Union High School Auditorium, El Monte Auditorium, El Monte Gymnasium, Old El Monte Gym, and The Pink Elephant) was a 3,500-seat multi-purpose indoor venue in El Monte, California.

It had originally been a combined auditorium and gymnasium located on the campus of El Monte Union High School. From the beginning, the venue served the school as well as the public in El Monte. Concerns about its soundness after the 1933 Long Beach earthquake nearly resulted in its closure, but tests that determined the building was stronger than previously believed, as well as the prohibitive costs of erecting a new auditorium, led to its preservation. El Monte Union High School, however, moved to a new campus.

In 1945, the American Legion, Post 261 bought the venue, renaming it El Monte Legion Stadium. In addition to using it for their meetings, they also leased it out for sporting events and concerts. Between 1949 and 1962, Legion Stadium overlapped as the host venue for Cliffie Stone's Hometown Jamboree and Art Laboe's "Oldies, but Goodies" concerts. These became an important part of the history of the country music and nascent rock and roll subcultures in the Greater Los Angeles area. The latter led to Frank Zappa and Ray Collins writing the song "Memories of El Monte".

Rising costs and changes in society led to Legion Stadium's decline. It was purchased by the USPS in 1973 and demolished in 1974.

== History ==
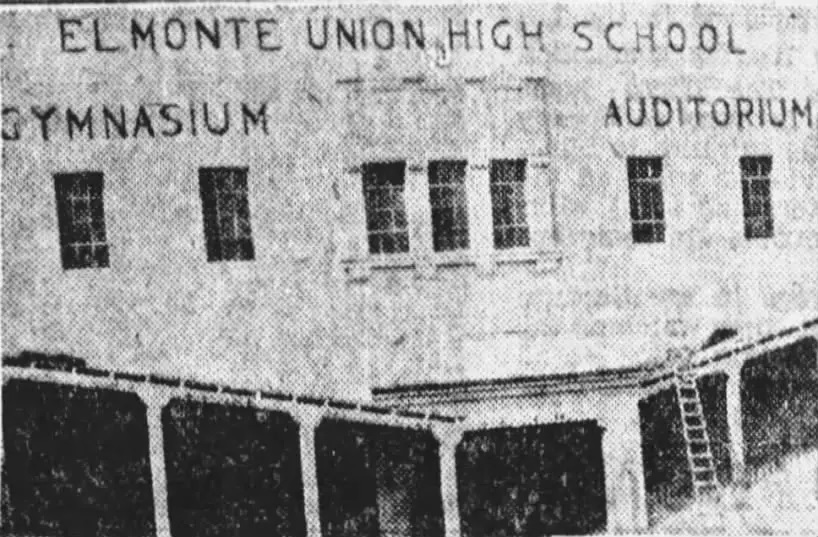
Façade of the El Monte Gymnasium Auditorium in 1928

=== School building ===
El Monte Legion Stadium, originally a combined auditorium and gymnasium, was the final component added to a complex of school buildings housing El Monte Union High School. The contract for $62,991 for the construction of the facility was publicly announced on September 30, 1927. By April 1, 1928, when construction was nearly complete, the cost was revised to $70,000, with an additional $10,000 needed for equipment. According to contractors Thurman & Thurman, it was "the best value of any building erected in Southern California" in the 1920s. Its seating capacity was announced to be 3,500.

By the end of the 1920s, El Monte Union High Auditorium was used by the public for entertainment and sporting events. In 1931, it was one of the venues that hosted the Junior Olympic Games. It also hosted celebratory exhibitions that preceded the 1932 Summer Olympics.

Damage incurred in the 1933 Long Beach earthquake left the adjoining buildings unsafe. In 1934, the school's administration building was abandoned and the future of the auditorium was debated. James Thurman, whose company had built it, said that one of the trustees of the El Monte Union High School District board had a personal grudge against him that led him to vigorously campaign for demolition. Tests demonstrated that the building was capable of withstanding significantly more stress than had previously been believed. The building was preserved after establishing that the cost of demolition would be in excess of what was spent on its construction. The remaining school buildings continued to be used until April 1937, when the threat of a student strike successfully persuaded the El Monte Union High School District board to move classes to safer facilities. Construction of the new El Monte Union High School began in December.

Throughout this period, the El Monte Union High Auditorium continued to be used. In 1935, during the inaugural El Monte Pioneer Days, it was the venue for The End of the Santa Fe Trail, a play that celebrated the city's early years.

During World War II, the auditorium was converted into a factory that produced airplane parts.

=== Legionnaires purchase ===
On January 16, 1945, the American Legion, Post 261, purchased the building from El Monte Union High School District for $26,650. A former Legionnaire, John W. Goodenow, explained the rationale for their purchase:

[W]e knew the boys were coming home from World War II and needed a place to have their parties and their meetings and to have a good time.

Another Legionnaire, Marshall Walker, said that the building was also intended to be a "living memorial to the war dead". It was initially renamed El Monte Athletic Club, but was later called El Monte Legion Stadium.

The American Legion leased the building to Claude Bridge, a local boxing promoter and former journalist. Boxing and wrestling matches were hosted by Legion Stadium twice a week and were very profitable in the immediate postwar years, but interest in them quickly dwindled. Among the boxers who fought at the venue was Kris Kristofferson in 1958, then a Rhodes Scholar at Pomona College.

=== Hometown Jamboree ===
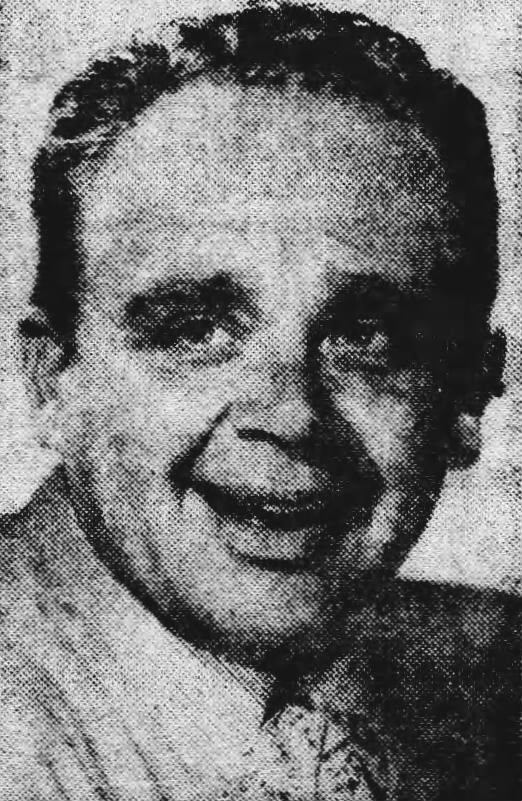
Cliffie Stone c. 1952

According to the Pasadena Independent Star-News, Legion Stadium reached its "heyday of popularity" when it became the home of Cliffie Stone's Hometown Jamboree, a country music television program that was initially broadcast locally on KLAC, then moved to KTLA. Originally, Hometown Jamboree had been a radio program that was broadcast live on Saturday nights from Placentia. Stone recalled that Tennessee Ernie Ford, one of the performers on Hometown Jamboree, had been the catalyst for the change of venue and broadcasting medium:

He'd heard about El Monte Legion Stadium. The crowds had gotten too big for Placentia. We needed a new place. We took a look at the stadium and moved the show. My wife, Dorothy, and I had about $1,400 [c. $18,000 in 2023] saved. We took that and went to KLAC, Channel 13, and bought two half-hour shows. We were risking our life savings.

The broadcast was an immediate success and gained Westinghouse Broadcasting as a sponsor; Stone soon became considered the "Ed Sullivan" of country music. At its peak, Hometown Jamboree was the highest-rated television program in Los Angeles and drew upwards of 4,000 people to Legion Stadium per show. Among the performers who appeared on the program at Legion Stadium were Molly Bee, Billy Strange, Joan O'Brien, Tex Ritter, Lefty Frizzell, Tex Williams, and Johnny Cash.

Hometown Jamboree was cancelled in 1959.

=== Art Laboe ===
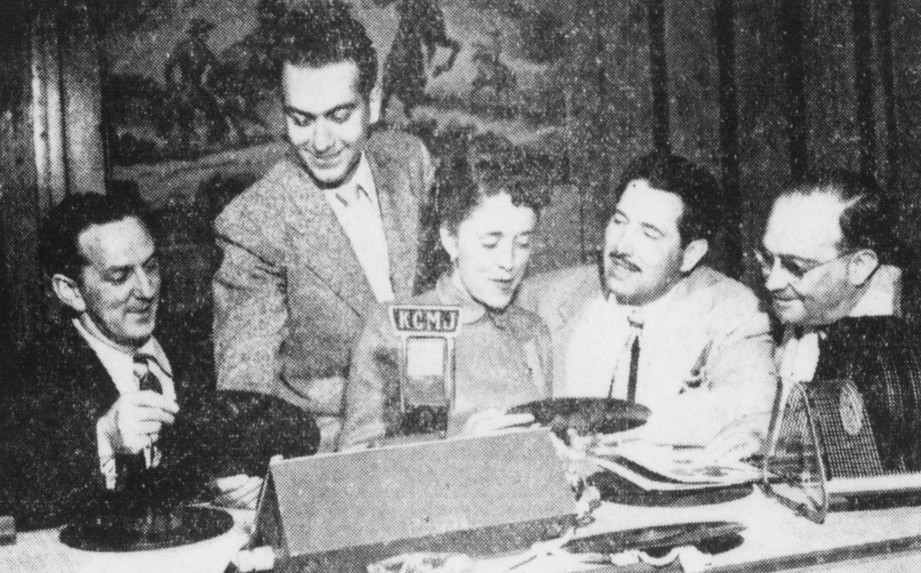
Art Laboe (standing, second from left) with staff from KCMJ, 1948

In 1955, Legion Stadium attracted the attention of Art Laboe, the host of a rock and roll radio show in Los Angeles. His "Oldies, but Goodies" programs had become so popular that the crowds who converged onto the Scrivner's Drive-In location on the corner of Sunset Blvd. and Cahuenga Ave. in Hollywood, where the show was broadcast live, caused traffic jams in the area. At first, Laboe sought a new show venue within the city of Los Angeles, but was dissuaded by its laws that placed restrictions on gatherings of people under the age of 18, which required permission from the board of the LAUSD. Instead, he chose El Monte, where local laws were more lenient. Nevertheless, Laboe, his business partner Hal Zeiger, and Johnny Otis, who also organized shows at Legion Stadium, ran into opposition from the El Monte City Council; their dance permits for Legion Stadium were revoked on the grounds that the rock and roll music performed at their shows created an "unwholesome, unhealthy situation". Otis accused the City Council of legislating against interracial relationships; he led a campaign with the ACLU, NAACP, and AFM, Local 47, that resulted in the reversal of the City Council's decision.

Laboe's shows at Legion Stadium began in 1957 and were produced on alternating weekends. They consisted of live performances and dances to prerecorded music, prioritized "fun, fun, fun", and dispensed with dress codes. Guest performers included The Penguins, Don and Dewey, Jackie Wilson, Sam Cooke, Ritchie Valens, Chuck Berry, Little Richard, Jerry Lee Lewis, Chubby Checker, Tommy Sands, The Coasters, and the Everly Brothers. According to Laboe, Legion Stadium would be filled to capacity, with a line of people hoping to get in coiling around the building twice over. "We used to have to shut the door because they were like sardines [inside of Legion Stadium]", he said.

Retrospectively, Laboe's shows at Legion Stadium are also remembered as a landmark in multiculturalism in Los Angeles. In 1995, Laboe recalled that "White kids from Beverly Hills, Black kids from Compton, and local Chicano kids" all went to his shows. According to one patron, interracial dating had become a common sight at Legion Stadium by the end of the 1950s:

When I went to El Monte [Legion Stadium], I felt I could date anybody I wanted to; I could dance with anybody I wanted to.

Altogether, by the time Laboe hosted his last "Oldies, but Goodies" show in 1962, he had produced over 300 of them, mostly at Legion Stadium.

=== Decline and final years ===
Changing trends in popular music, its attendant industry, and society in general during the 1960s led to a drop in musical bookings for Legion Stadium. A former patron recalled:

The shows inside the place reflected the changes going on outside. Stabbings, beatings, and riots were commonplace. Rival gangs fought each other as the music provided them with a soundtrack.

Although Legion Stadium continued to be used for sporting events and live music, including hosting three nights for Grateful Dead in 1970 and a show for Johnny Winter in 1971, rising taxes and operating costs made it more difficult for the American Legion to earn a profit.

In May 1969, the United States Post Office announced that they were considering acquiring the 2.49 acre property and had appraised it for $285,000 (c. $2,400,000 in 2023). On November 29, the Post Office said that it would acquire Legion Stadium and an adjoining building for a total of $510,000 (c. $4,000,000 in 2023); a new branch office serving El Monte would be built in its place under a lease agreement with a private developer. The process was stalled by the reorganization of the Post Office into the USPS, but was finalized in January 1973 after Legion Stadium was sold to the United States Army Corps of Engineers for $369,800 (c. $2,600,000 in 2023). The last event hosted there took place in September 1973.

=== Demolition ===
Legion Stadium was demolished on August 9, 1974.

== Legacy ==
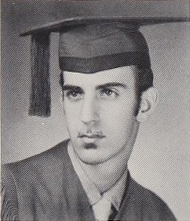
Frank Zappa (pictured in 1958) and Ray Collins collaborated on writing the song "Memories of El Monte" in 1962.

=== "Memories of El Monte" ===
Experiences at Legion Stadium led Frank Zappa and Ray Collins to write the 1962 song "Memories of El Monte", which was named after an eponymous LP compilation produced by Laboe. Zappa had presented the song to Laboe, who agreed to produce it as a single for his label Original Sound Recordings. Laboe prevailed upon Cleve Duncan from The Penguins to sing the lead, with members of The Viceroys, a local band, singing backing vocals; he also asked Zappa to amend the lyrics so as to mention the groups included on the Memories of El Monte LP. The song's second verse mentions these groups and quotes from their songs, while Duncan performs vocal impersonations of them. The song concludes with an evocation of El Monte and Legion Stadium.

=== Tributes ===
In 2014, Vincent Ramos erected his "El Monte Legion Stadium Nocturne" at El Monte station. The work commemorates performers associated with Stone, Laboe, and Otis, as well as athletes who played at Legion Stadium. Their likenesses are displayed atop images of 45s. In 2018, Union Walk, a 62-unit townhouse complex built on the property that was formerly the location of Legion Stadium, opened to the public. Its grand opening ceremony was hosted by Laboe, who was commemorated in an entrance fountain designed by Rebecca Niederlander. She recorded Laboe's reminiscences of Legion Stadium, which are displayed on a nearby plaque:

There was a lot of duplication of friendships and just a lot of fun on Saturday night, as we all danced and sang and had a great time. Times we will never forget, lives in the hearts and minds of the thousands that attended the El Monte Legion Stadium through the years. This is Art Laboe and I sure hope that you all have as good a time as we had back in the day at El Monte Legion Stadium! See you there, Saturday night!

His words were converted into a soundwave image that serves as a motif circling the fountain's base.
