= Robert Russa Moton Boyhood Home =

Historic house in Virginia, United States

- Robert Russa Moton House
- U.S. National Register of Historic Places
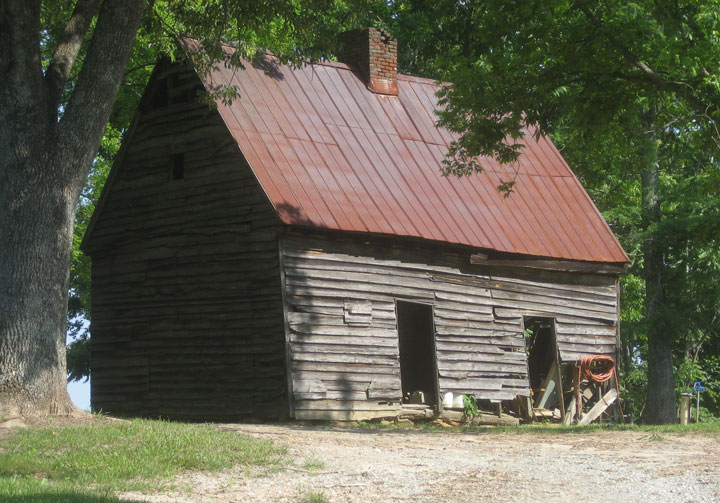

- Location within Virginia Location within the United States
- Location: 4162 Lockett Road (Route 619), about 10 miles from Rice, Virginia
- Coordinates: 37.32348°N 78.26908°W
- Area: 246 acres (100 ha)
- Built: c. 1746
- NRHP reference No.: 14000149
- Added to NRHP: April 11, 2014

The Robert Russa Moton Boyhood Home, also known as Pleasant Shade, is a historic plantation near Rice in rural Prince Edward County, Virginia. The 246-acre (100 ha) plantation was the childhood home of African-American educator Robert Russa Moton between 1869 and 1880. The kitchen housing area where Moton lived is also believed to incorporate one of the county's oldest buildings, dating to about 1746. The plantation was also the scene of fighting during the American Civil War, in the later stages of the Battle of Sailor's Creek of April 6, 1865.

The property was listed on the National Register of Historic Places in 2014.

== See also ==
- National Register of Historic Places listings in Prince Edward County, Virginia
