= Charlie Aldrich =

American musician

Charles William Aldrich (June 3, 1921 – January 25, 2015), better known by his stage name of Walkin' Charlie Aldrich, was an American country musician.

== Biography ==
Aldrich was born in Agawam, near Bradley, Grady, Oklahoma in June 1921. He bought his first guitar during the Great Depression and worked in cotton fields. During World War II, he served in the Navy and was discharged in 1946; following this, he worked in a grocery store.

Aldrich started a band in Oklahoma and got a spot on CBS radio performing on a show called Oklahoma Roundup. After moving to California, he started playing with Spade Cooley, T. Texas Tyler, and Tony Martin, and eventually signed on to Cliffie Stone's Hometown Jamboree.

In 1951, he released his best-known song, "Walkin' the Guitar Strings". In the wake of its popularity, he was offered his own show on television station KTTV. He also wrote songs which were published by Acuff-Rose and the Tannen Music Company, and ran a recording studio in Burbank, California. Alongside this, he graduated from the Los Angeles Conservatory of Music with a degree in classical guitar.

He died in Las Vegas, Nevada in January 2015 at the age of 93.
