= Merrill Moore =

Merrill Moore may refer to:

- Merrill Moore (poet), American psychiatrist and poet
- Merrill Moore (musician), American swing and boogie-woogie pianist and bandleader

== See also ==
- Merrill Moores, American lawyer and politician
