= Don Raye =

American songwriter (1909–1985)

Background information
- Born: Donald MacRae Wilhoite Jr. March 16, 1909
- Origin: Washington, D.C., U.S.
- Died: January 29, 1985 (aged 75)
- Occupation: Songwriter

Don Raye (born Donald MacRae Wilhoite Jr., March 16, 1909 – January 29, 1985) was an American songwriter, best known for his songs for The Andrews Sisters such as "Beat Me Daddy, Eight to the Bar", "The House of Blue Lights", "Just for a Thrill" and "Boogie Woogie Bugle Boy." The latter was co-written with Hughie Prince.

While known for such wordy novelty numbers, he also wrote the lyrics to "You Don't Know What Love Is," a simple, poetic lament of unusual power. He also composed the song "(That Place) Down the Road a Piece," one of his boogie woogie songs, which has a medium bright boogie tempo. It was written for the Will Bradley Orchestra, who recorded it in 1940, but the song was destined to become a rock and roll standard, recorded by The Rolling Stones, Chuck Berry, Jerry Lee Lewis, Foghat, Amos Milburn, Harry Gibson, and countless others. In 1940, he wrote the lyrics for the patriotic song "This Is My Country".

In 1985, Don Raye was inducted into the Songwriters Hall of Fame.

== History ==
Raye started his career as a dancer, going on to win the "Virginia State Dancing Championship." He started work in vaudeville as a song and dance man often writing his own songs for his act. In 1935, he started work as a songwriter, collaborating with composers Sammy Cahn and Saul Chaplin, and bandleader-saxophonist Jimmie Lunceford.

His great success with "Beat Me Daddy, Eight to the Bar" (co-written with Bradley's drummer Ray McKinley) led Raye to write follow-up songs, in collaboration with Hughie Prince: "Scrub Me Mama, with a Boogie Beat" and "Bounce Me Brother, with a Solid Four." Raye and Prince were signed by Universal Pictures to score musical comedies with The Andrews Sisters, The Ritz Brothers, and Abbott and Costello; the Andrews trio recorded some of the Raye-Prince compositions for Decca Records. Raye and Prince also penned a risqué, best-selling novelty hit, "She Had to Go and Lose It at the Astor."

Raye joined the United States Army in 1941, and served in World War II. Upon his return he resumed songwriting in Hollywood and worked alongside Gene de Paul at Universal Studios, penning the Dinah Shore hit "Daddy-O, I'm Gonna Teach You Some Blues." Their biggest hit was "I'll Remember April." He and de Paul wrote three original songs for Walt Disney's The Adventures of Ichabod and Mr. Toad as well as A Song is Born. Raye and de Paul also wrote "Beware the Jabberwock," a song for Disney's Alice in Wonderland, which was not included in the final version of the film. A demo was recorded, and is included on the 2004 and 2010 DVD releases of the Disney movie.

Raye co-wrote "The Ballad of Thunder Road" with its script writer and star, Robert Mitchum. The Robert Mitchum version of the song did not appear in the 1958 movie Thunder Road, but was released by Capitol Records.

He co-wrote "The House of Blue Lights" in 1946 with Freddie Slack, a song which was recorded originally by Freddie Slack with Ella Mae Morse on vocals, by The Andrews Sisters, Merrill Moore (1952), Chuck Miller (1955), Chuck Berry, George Thorogood and the Destroyers, Asleep at the Wheel, and Jerry Lee Lewis.

== Publications ==
In 1971, the Charles E. Tuttle Company published Raye's Like Haiku, a collection of poems. He called them "not haiku in the true sense. They are 'like' haiku. An Occidental songwriter's haiku. I have merely used that stringent form to frame my own pictures of wonder, my moments of awareness of those things which have made me feel."
