= Falkland (Redd Shop, Virginia) =

Historic house in Virginia, United States

- U.S. National Register of Historic Places
- Virginia Landmarks Register
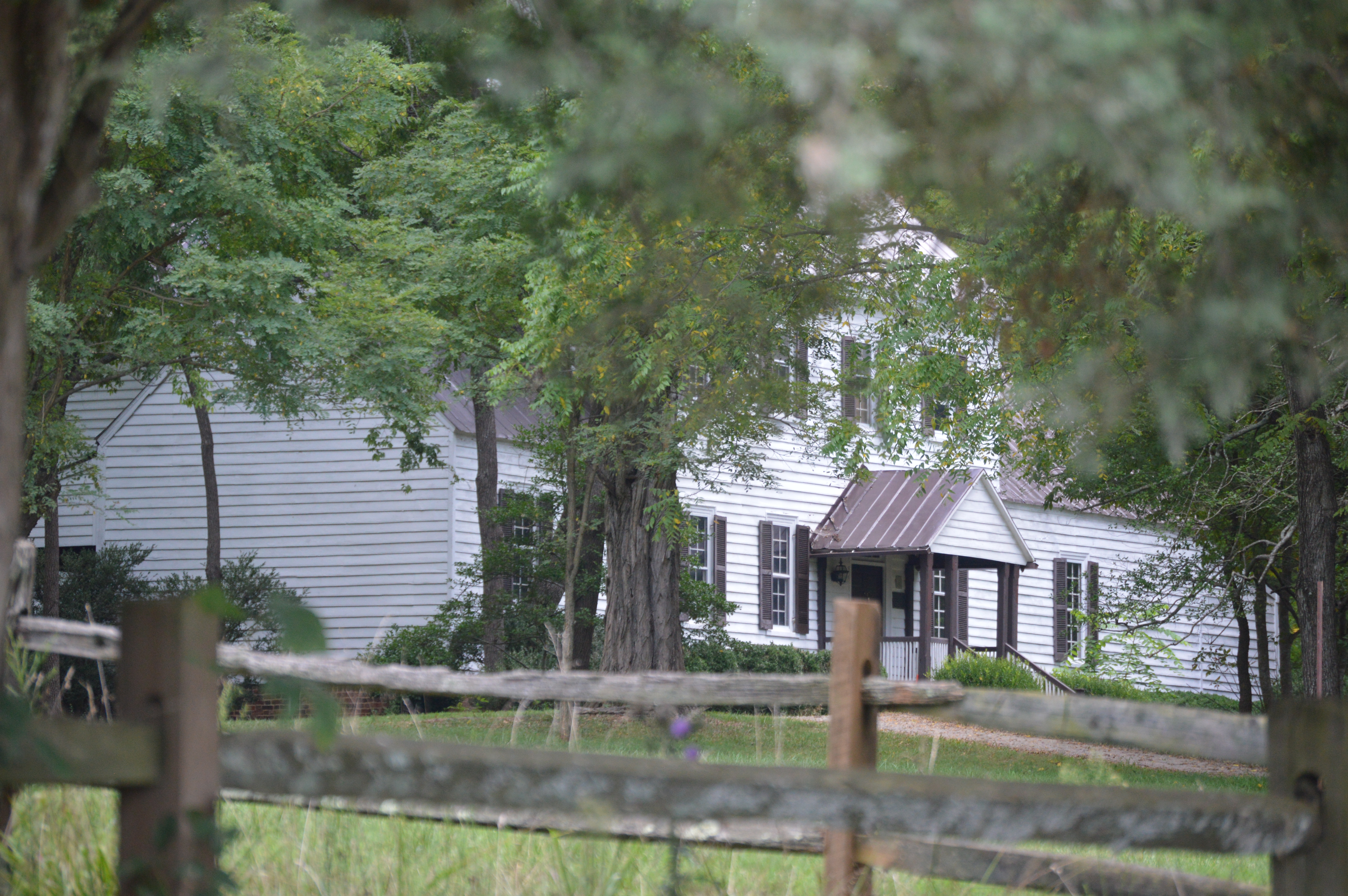
- Roadside view

- Location within Virginia Location within the United States
- Location: Northwest of Meherrin, Virginia, on Falkland Road
- Coordinates: 37°7′51″N 78°24′32″W
- Area: 4 acres (1.6 ha)
- Built: c. 1750/1815
- NRHP reference No.: 79003071
- VLR No.: 073-0039

Significant dates
- Added to NRHP: June 22, 1979
- Designated VLR: March 20, 1979

Falkland is a historic plantation house located at Redd Shop, Prince Edward County, Virginia. It was built about 1750, and the frame dwelling consists of a two-story, four-bay, central block with one-story flanking wings. It has a hall-and-parlor plan. A two-story, two-bay frame rear ell was added in the 1850s.

It was listed on the National Register of Historic Places in 1979.
