= Hometown Jamboree =

American music radio and television show

Hometown Jamboree was an American country music radio and television show simultaneously broadcast each Saturday night by KXLA radio, Pasadena, California and KLAC-TV/KCOP and KTLA-TV, Los Angeles, California beginning in 1949.

== Synopsis ==
The show was created by and hosted by Cliffie Stone and first held at the Legion Stadium in El Monte, California, and later at the Harmony Park Ballroom in Anaheim, California. Hometown Jamboree was sponsored by the Hub Furniture store once it moved to Anaheim. The show was the springboard for many of country music's premier musicians including Tennessee Ernie Ford, Billy Strange, Zane Ashton (a.k.a. Bill Aken), Speedy West, and a host of others. The show ended each week with the cast singing a hymn, a tradition Tennessee Ernie Ford brought to his own program The Ford Show Starring Tennessee Ernie Ford. By that time, Cliffie Stone was Ford's personal manager.

Hometown Jamboree premiered as a weekly TV broadcast in December 1949 over KLAC-TV (later known as KCOP) in Los Angeles; in 1953 it moved to KTLA-TV, where it ran until its cancellation in 1959.

== Performers ==
- Charlie Aldrich
- Molly Bee
- Jeanne Black
- Jimmy Bryant
- Tennessee Ernie Ford
- Dallas Frazier
- Johnny Horton
- Nikki Hornsby
- Ferlin Husky
- Skeets McDonald
- Merrill Moore
- Joanie O'Brien
- Gene O'Quin
- Tommy Sands
- Carl Saunders
- Cliffie Stone
- Billy Strange
- Bucky Tibbs
- Merle Travis
- Speedy West
