= Redd Shop, Virginia =

Unincorporated community in Virginia, United States

Redd Shop
- Unincorporated community
- Location within the Commonwealth of Virginia Redd Shop (the United States)
- Coordinates: 37°11′30″N 78°25′48″W
- Country: United States
- State: Virginia
- County: Prince Edward
- Time zone: UTC−5 (Eastern (EST))
  - Summer (DST): UTC−4 (EDT)
- GNIS feature ID: 1473071

Redd Shop is an unincorporated community in Prince Edward County, Virginia, United States.

Falkland was listed on the National Register of Historic Places in 1979.
