= Roy Clark =

American singer, musician & TV host (1933–2018)

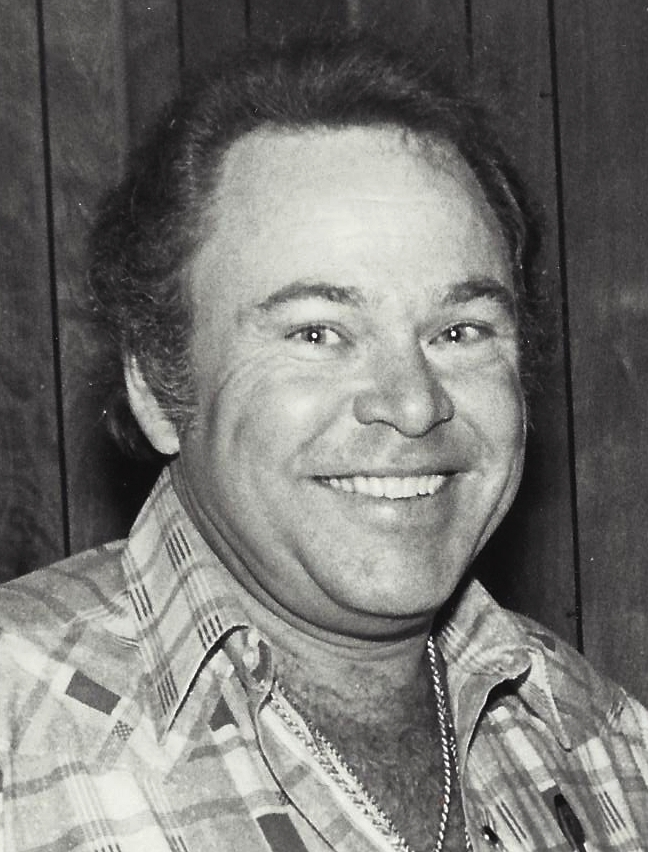
- Clark in 1981

Background information
- Born: Roy Linwood Clark; April 15, 1933; Meherrin, Virginia, U.S.
- Died: November 15, 2018 (aged 85) Tulsa, Oklahoma, U.S.
- Genres: Country; rockabilly
- Occupations: Singer; musician; TV host
- Instruments: Vocals; guitar; banjo; fiddle; harmonica
- Years active: 1947–2018
- Formerly of: Hee Haw

Roy Linwood Clark (April 15, 1933 – November 15, 2018) was an American singer, musician and television presenter. He is best known for having co-hosted Hee Haw, a nationally televised country music variety show, with Buck Owens, from 1969 to 1993. Clark was an important and influential figure in country music, both as a performer and in helping to popularize the genre. Clark was highly regarded and renowned as a guitarist, banjo player and fiddler.

During the 1970s, Clark frequently guest-hosted for Johnny Carson on The Tonight Show; he also enjoyed a 30-million viewership for Hee Haw. He was skilled in the traditions of many genres, including classical guitar, country music, Latin music, bluegrass and pop. He had hit songs as a country music vocalist (e.g., "Yesterday, When I Was Young" and "Thank God and Greyhound") and his instrumental skill had an enormous effect on generations of bluegrass and country musicians. He became a member of the Grand Ole Opry in 1987 and, in 2009, was inducted into the Country Music Hall of Fame. He published his autobiography, My Life—in Spite of Myself, in 1994.

== Early life ==
Clark was born April 15, 1933, in Meherrin, Virginia, one of five children born to Hester Linwood Clark and Lillian Clark (Oliver). His father was a tobacco farmer. He spent his childhood in Meherrin and Great Kills, Staten Island, New York City, where his father moved the family to take jobs during the Great Depression. When Clark was 11 years old, his family moved to a home on 1st Street SE in the Washington Highlands neighborhood of Washington, D.C., after his father had found work at the Washington Navy Yard.

Clark's father was a semi-professional musician who played banjo, fiddle and guitar, and his mother played piano. The first musical instrument Clark ever played was a four-string cigar box with a ukulele neck attached to it, which he picked up in elementary school. His father taught Clark to play guitar when Roy was 14 years old and soon Clark was playing banjo, guitar and mandolin. "Guitar was my real love, though," Clark later said. "I never copied anyone, but I was certainly influenced by them; especially by George Barnes. I just loved his swing style and tone."

Clark also found inspiration in other local D.C. musicians. "One of the things that influenced me growing up around Washington, D.C., in the '50s was that it had an awful lot of good musicians. And I used to go in and just steal them blind. I stole all their licks. It wasn't until years later that I found out that a lot of them used to cringe and say 'Oh, no! Here comes that kid again' when I'd come in. As for his banjo style, Clark said in 1985, "When I started playing, you didn't have many choices to follow and Earl Scruggs was both of them." Clark won the National Banjo Championship in 1947 and 1948. He played his first professional gig in his father's band at age 15, earning a $2 bill and he briefly toured with the band.

Clark was very shy and turned to humor as a way of easing his timidity. Country-western music was widely derided by Clark's schoolmates, leaving him socially isolated. Clowning around, he felt, helped him to fit in again. Clark used humor as a musician as well and it was not until the mid-1960s that he felt confident enough to perform in public without using humor in his act.

The D.C. area had a number of country-western music venues at the time. Duet acts were in favor and for his public performance debut Clark teamed up with Carl Lukat. Lukat was the lead guitarist and Clark supported him on rhythm guitar. In 1949, at the age of 16, Clark made his television debut on WTTG, the DuMont Television Network affiliate in Washington, D.C. At 17, he made his first appearance on the Grand Ole Opry in recognition for winning his second national banjo title. By this time, he had begun to play fiddle and twelve-string guitar. He toured the country for the next 18 months playing backup guitar during the week for David "Stringbean" Akeman, Annie Lou and Danny, Lonzo and Oscar and Hal and Velma Smith, working county fairs and small town theaters. On weekends, these acts usually teamed up with country music superstars like Red Foley or Ernest Tubb and played large venues in big cities. He earned $150 a week ($2,007 in 2025 dollars). After the tour, Clark returned to performing at local country-music venues. He recorded singles for Coral Records and 4 Star Records.

At the age of 23, Clark obtained his pilot's certificate and then bought a 1953 Piper Tri-Pacer (N1132C), which he flew for many years. This plane was raffled off on December 17, 2012, to benefit the charity Wings of Hope. He owned other planes, including a Mitsubishi MU-2, Stearman PT-17 and Mitsubishi MU-300 Diamond 1A business jet.

== Career ==
=== Television ===
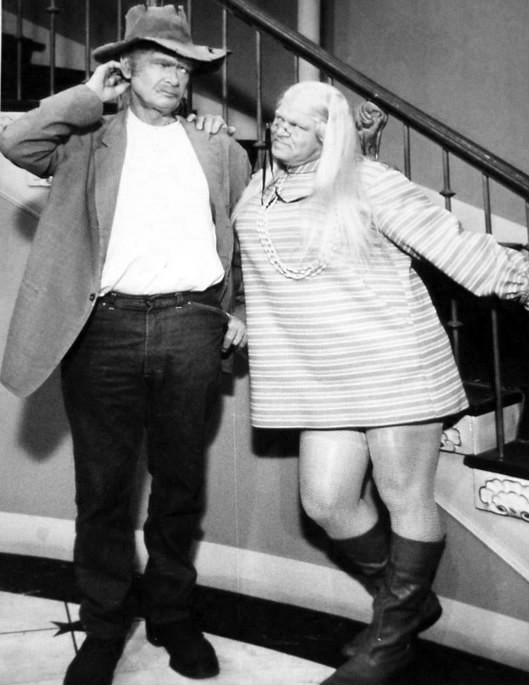
Clark (right) as "Myrtle Halsey" on The Beverly Hillbillies, 1968

Rising country music star Jimmy Dean asked Clark to join his band, the Texas Wildcats, in 1954. Clark was the lead guitarist, and made appearances on Dean's "Town and Country Time" program on WARL-AM and on WMAL-TV (after the show moved to television from radio in 1955). Clark competed in 1956 on Arthur Godfrey's Talent Scouts, a variety show airing on CBS. It was his first network television appearance and he came in second. Dean, who valued punctuality among musicians in his band, fired Clark for habitual tardiness in 1957. Clark left D.C. and never lived there again. During his D.C. years, Clark said he never intended to be a country guitarist. Rather, he played when he liked and what made him feel good and never intended to begin a recording career or to perform on television. In the spring of 1959, Clark appeared regularly on George Hamilton IV's short-lived television series in Washington, D.C.

In 1960, Clark went to Las Vegas, where he worked as a guitarist in a band led by former West Coast Western Swing bandleader-comedian Hank Penny. During the very early 1960s, he was also prominent in the backing band for Wanda Jackson—known as the Party Timers—during the latter part of her rockabilly period.

During Jack Paar's temporary absence from The Tonight Show in early 1960, Jimmy Dean was asked to guest-host the program. Dean asked Clark to appear on the last night of his guest-host stint and showcased Clark in two songs. Clark made his solo debut on The Tonight Show in January 1963.

Subsequently, Clark appeared on The Beverly Hillbillies as a recurring character — actually two, as he played businessman Roy Halsey and Roy's mother, Myrtle. Once, in an episode of the Saturday evening Jackie Gleason Show dedicated to country music, Clark played a blistering rendition of "Down Home". Later, he appeared in an episode of The Odd Couple, where he played "Malagueña".

In the mid-1960s, he was a co-host (along with Molly Bee and Rusty Draper) of a weekday daytime country variety series for NBC titled Swingin' Country, which was canceled after two seasons. In 1969, Clark and Buck Owens debuted as hosts on the syndicated sketch comedy program Hee Haw, which aired from 1969 until 1997 and propelled Clark to stardom. During its tenure, Clark was a member of the Million Dollar Band and participated in a host of comedy sketches. In 1976, Arthur Fiedler conducted Evening at Pops with Roy Clark and the Boston Pops Orchestra. In 1983, Clark opened the Roy Clark Celebrity Theatre in Branson, Missouri, which was the "first venue linked permanently to a widely known entertainer" in the resort town.

Clark frequently played in Branson during the 1980s and 1990s. He sold the venue in 1992 (now owned by the Hughes Brothers and renamed the Hughes American Family Theatre) and went back to a light touring schedule. Clark annually appeared with Ramona Jones and the Jones Family Band at their annual tribute to Clark's former Hee Haw co-star Grandpa Jones in Mountain View, Arkansas. On July 4, 1984, Roy played Washington D.C. along with several other acts to over 500,000 fans. Some of the other acts included Ringo Starr, the Beach Boys, Three Dog Night, George Jones and B.J. Thomas.

=== Music ===
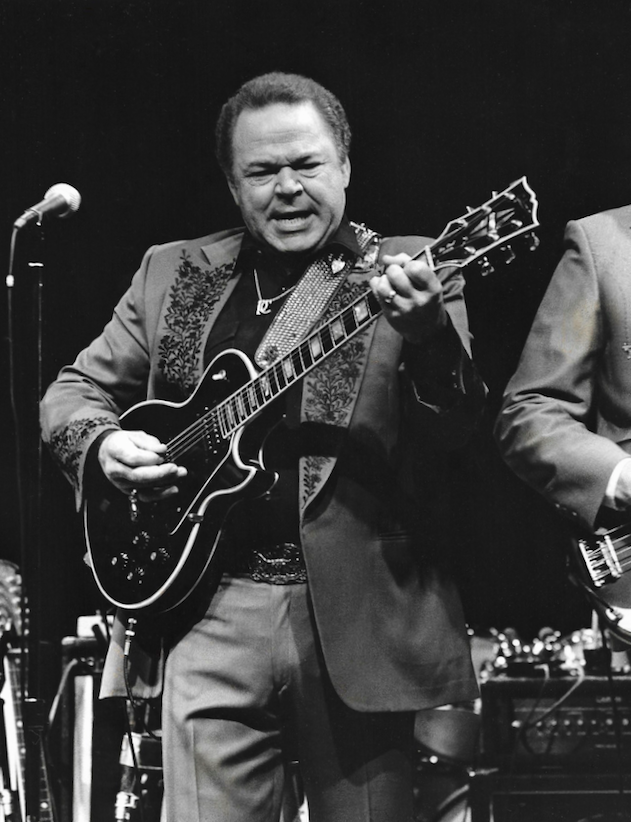
Roy Clark performing onstage in New York, late 1980s or early 1990s

In 1960, Clark began touring with rockabilly star Wanda Jackson and playing backup instrumentals on several of her recordings. Through Jackson, Clark met Jim Halsey. Clark signed with the Halsey Agency, which represented him for the remainder of his career. During this period, Jackson performed at the Golden Nugget casino in Las Vegas. Within two years, Clark had become a headliner in Vegas, and made numerous appearances there in the 1960s and 1970s.

Clark's backup work for Jackson brought him to the attention of Capitol Records. He signed with Capitol and in 1962 released his first solo album, The Lightning Fingers of Roy Clark. The album won solid critical praise and "above-average" notice from fans. By the early 1970s, Clark was the highest-paid country music star in the United States, earning $7 million ($58,000,000 in 2025 dollars) a year.

He switched to Dot Records and again scored hits. He later recorded for ABC Records, which had acquired Dot and MCA Records, the latter of which then was allowed to absorb the ABC label.

== Endorsements ==
Clark endorsed Mosrite, Gretsch and Heritage Guitars; the latter produced a signature model. In the 1980s, he served as a spokesman for Hunt's ketchup.

== Personal life ==
Clark married Ruby Conley in 1954. They had a son, Roy Linwood Clark Jr. The couple divorced in 1957. Roy married Barbara Joyce Rupard on August 31, 1957. They remained wed until Roy's death in 2018. The couple had five children. They made their home in Tulsa, Oklahoma, where the Roy Clark Elementary School was named in his honor in 1978.

Clark died on November 15, 2018, at age 85, at his Tulsa home from complications of pneumonia.

== Honors ==
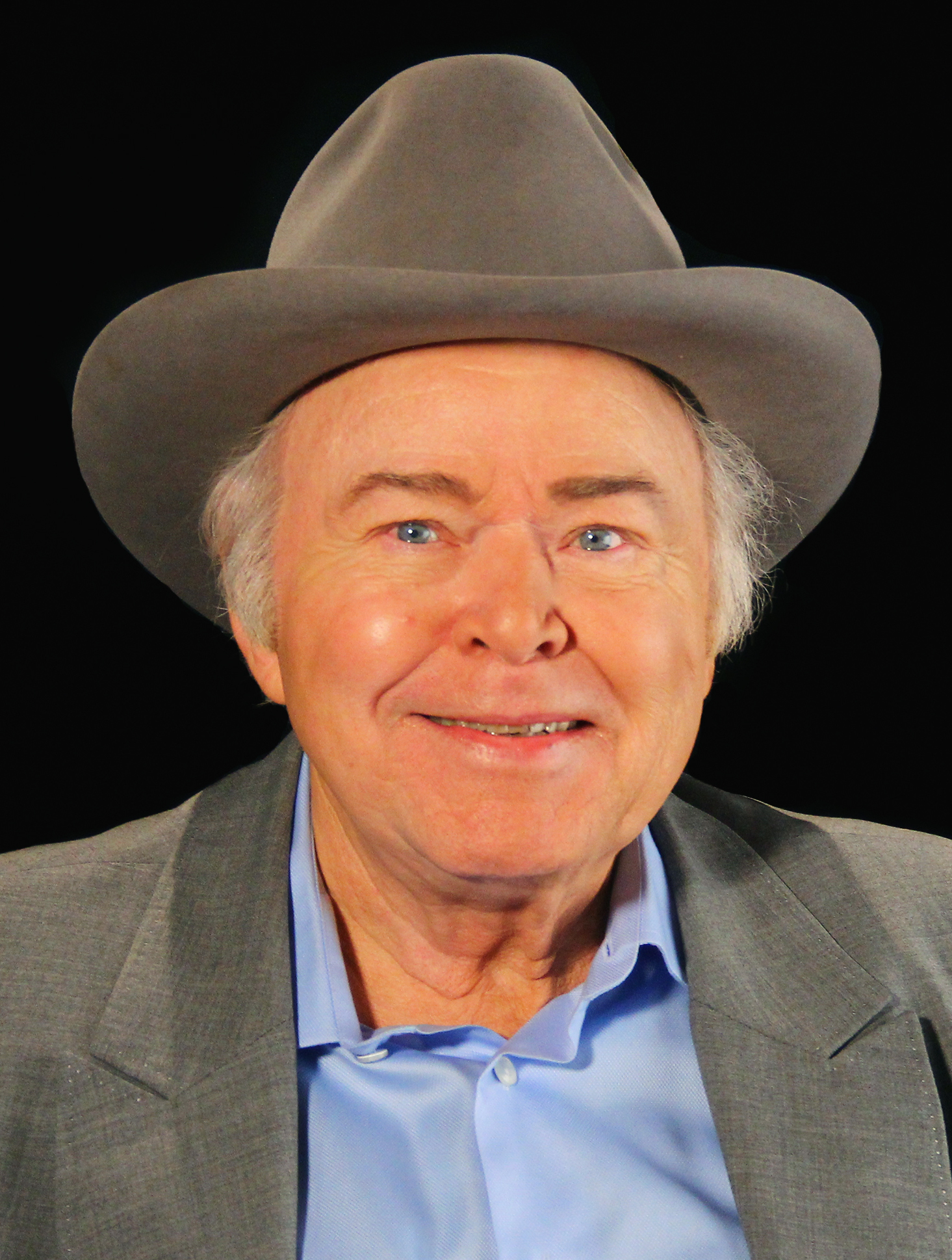
Clark on the set of the Oklahoma Educational Television Authority's A Conversation With... in Tulsa, Oklahoma, in 2014.

By the early 1970s, Clark had been named "Entertainer of the Year" three times by the Academy of Country Music and the Country Music Association (CMA). The Academy also named him "Best Lead Guitar Player" and "Best Comedy Act", while the CMA named him an "International Friendship Ambassador" in 1976 after Clark toured the Soviet Union.

On August 22, 1987, Clark was made a member of the Grand Ole Opry. He played an annual benefit concert at Longwood University in Farmville, Virginia, the proceeds of which went to fund scholarships for aspiring musicians.

Clark was inducted into the Country Music Hall of Fame in 2009. On April 12, 2011, Clark was honored by the Oklahoma House of Representatives. He was honored by the Oklahoma Music Hall of Fame as Oklahoma's Music Ambassador for Children and presented with a commendation from Oklahoma Governor Mary Fallin. In 2007, he was inducted into the Cheyenne Frontier Days Hall of Fame. He was inducted into the Fiddlers Hall of Fame. Roy Clark was one of the founding inductees into the Virginia Musical Museum & Virginia Music Hall of Fame in 2013. Wayne Newton, Ella Fitzgerald, The Carter Family, The Statler Brothers, Bruce Hornsby, Pearl Bailey and Ralph Stanley were the other founding inductees.

Legacy

In August 2026, following a five-year search for a suitable permanent home, Clark’s widow, Barbara Clark, donated his personal and professional archive to The Church Studio in Tulsa, Oklahoma. The donation was secured through the efforts by The Church Studio founder and CEO Teresa Knox. The archive includes photographs, awards, concert posters, personal and professional papers, stage and television wardrobe, memorabilia, and an extensive collection of stringed instruments.

== Selected filmography ==
=== Film and television ===
- Swingin' Country 1966 NBC daytime variety series, co-starred with Rusty Draper and Molly Bee
- Five episodes of The Beverly Hillbillies as "Cousin Roy" (1969)
- 294 episodes of Hee Haw (1969–1997)
- Swing Out, Sweet Land (1970)
- The Flip Wilson Show (1971)
- Sesame Street (1972)
- Love, American Style (1973) (episode "Love and the Twanger Tutor" as Jesse Clemens)
- The Odd Couple (1975) (episode "The Roy Clark Show" as Willie Boggs)
- The Bell Telephone Jubilee (1976)
- The Captain & Tennille Special (1976)
- Fair Weather Friends (1977)
- Hanna-Barbera's All-Star Comedy Ice Revue (1978)
- Matilda (1978)
- The Muppet Show (1978)
- Fifty Years of Country Music (1978) CBS television special, featuring Clark, Dolly Parton and Glen Campbell as co-hosts.
- Austin City Limits (1980, 1982)
- Epcot Center opening celebration (1982)
- Disneyland's 30th Anniversary Celebration (1985)
- Uphill All the Way (1986)
- 6th Annual National Songwriter Awards (1986)
- Freeway (1988)
- The Grand Ole Opry 65th Anniversary (1991)
- Gordy (1995)
- The Grand Ole Opry 70th Anniversary (1996)
- A Bing Crosby Christmas (1998)
- Palo Pinto Gold (2009)

== Awards ==
- 1970 – CMA – Comedian of the Year
- 1972 – ACM – Entertainer of the Year
- 1973 – ACM – Entertainer of the Year
- 1973 – CMA – Entertainer of the Year
- 1975 – CMA – Instrumental Group of the Year (with Buck Trent)
- 1976 – CMA – Instrumental Group of the Year (with Buck Trent)
- 1977 – CMA – Instrumentalist of the Year
- 1978 – CMA – Instrumentalist of the Year
- 1980 – CMA – Instrumentalist of the Year
- 1982 – Grammy Award for Best Country Instrumental Performance for his recording of Alabama Jubilee

== Bibliography ==
- Clark, Roy; Eliot, Marc (1994). My Life—In Spite of Myself!. New York: Simon & Schuster. ISBN 978-0-671-86434-7.
- The Comprehensive Country Music Encyclopedia: From the Editors of 'Country Music' Magazine. New York: Times Books. October 18, 1994. ISBN 978-0-8129-2247-9.
- Moritz, Chester, ed. (1979). Current Biography Yearbook. New York: H. W. Wilson Co. OCLC 1565606.
- Ferguson, Jim (1979). The Guitar Player Book. New York: Random House. ISBN 978-0-3941-7169-2.
- Flint, Joseph H.; Nelson, Judy (1993). The Insider's Country Music Handbook. Salt Lake City: Gibbs-Smith. ISBN 978-0-8790-5563-9.
- Gregory, Andy, ed. (2002). International Who's Who in Popular Music 2002 (fourth ed.). London: Europa Publications. ISBN 978-1-8574-3161-2.
- Kingsbury, Paul (December 16, 2004). The Encyclopedia of Country Music. New York: Oxford University Press. ISBN 978-0-1951-7608-7.
- Larkin, Colin (1995). The Guinness Encyclopedia of Popular Music. Volume 1: A Cappella—Clarke, Johnny. New York: Stockton Press. ISBN 978-0-8511-2662-3.
- Lornell, Kip (June 1, 2012). Exploring American Folk Music: Ethnic, Grassroots and Regional Traditions in the United States. Jackson, Miss.: University Press of Mississippi. ISBN 978-1-6170-3264-6.
- Simon, Jordan (February 28, 1995). Branson: The Official Travel and Souvenir Guide to America's Music Show Capital. New York: Fodor's Travel Publications. ISBN 978-0-6790-2817-8.
- Stambler, Irwin; Landon, Grelun (July 14, 2000). Country Music: The Encyclopedia. New York: St. Martin's Griffin. ISBN 978-0-3122-6487-1.
