= Going Steady (1958 film) =

1958 film by Fred F. Sears

- Directed by: Fred F. Sears
- Screenplay by: Budd Grossman
- Story by: Budd Grossman; Summer Arthur Long (as Summer A. Long)
- Produced by: Sam Katzman
- Starring: Molly Bee; Alan Reed Jr.
- Cinematography: Benjamin H. Kline
- Edited by: Charles Nelson
- Color process: Black and white
- Production company: Clover Productions
- Distributed by: Columbia Pictures
- Release date: February 1958
- Running time: 82 minutes
- Country: United States
- Language: English

Going Steady is a 1958 American comedy romance film directed by Fred F. Sears and starring Molly Bee and Alan Reed Jr.

== Plot ==
Julie Ann Turner, 17, wants to travel by car with friends Olive and Woody from her Pasadena, California home to Reno, Nevada, where her boyfriend Calvin Potter will be participating in a basketball game. Her mom Grace talks her opposed dad Gordon into letting her go.

Calvin makes a game-winning shot. Everyone celebrates afterward, and Julie Ann, in her excitement, suggests to Calvin that they elope, just as her Aunt Lola did at that age. Calvin agrees, but they decide to keep the wedding secret for a while when they get home.

As time goes by, Julie Ann asks friend Olive to accompany her to see an obstetrician. Rumor spreads that Olive is expecting a baby, so Julie Ann admits it's actually her. When the news is broken to her parents, it comes as news to Calvin, too. He moves in with the Turners, accepted by mother-in-law Grace but infuriating father-in-law Gordon, whose demand that the marriage be annulled is rejected with Julie being pregnant.

Calvin quarrels with his bride and reluctantly takes a job in her dad's hardware store. Aunt Lola arrives in time for Julie Ann's graduation day and turns out to be helpful as Grace finally persuades Gordon to give the kids his blessing in beginning their new lives.

== Cast ==
- Molly Bee as Julie Ann Turner Potter
- Alan Reed Jr. as Calvin Potter
- Bill Goodwin as Gordon P. Turner
- Irene Hervey as Grace Turner
- Ken Miller as Woody Simmons
- Susan Easter as Olive Nelson
- Linda Watkins as Aunt Lola
- Byron Foulger as Mr. George Potter
- Hugh Sanders as Mr. Ahern
- Florence Ravenel as Mrs. Potter
- Ralph Moody as Justice of the Peace

== See also ==
- List of American films of 1958
