= Worsham, Virginia =

Unincorporated community in Virginia, United States

Worsham
- Unincorporated community
- Location within the Commonwealth of Virginia Worsham (the United States)
- Coordinates: 37°13′49″N 78°26′35″W
- Country: United States
- State: Virginia
- County: Prince Edward
- Time zone: UTC−5 (Eastern (EST))
  - Summer (DST): UTC−4 (EDT)

Worsham is an unincorporated community in Prince Edward County, Virginia, United States. It served as the county seat of Prince Edward County from 1754 to 1872, and as a result a number of historic public buildings may still be found there. Among these are the old debtors' prison and the old county clerk's office, both of which are listed on the National Register of Historic Places. Worsham is also the site of the old Worsham elementary school, used by the Prince Edward county school system. Near Worsham is the former Worsham High School, listed on the Register in 2010.

Abraham B. Venable was a native of the Worsham area.
