= Molly Bee =

American country music singer (1939–2009)

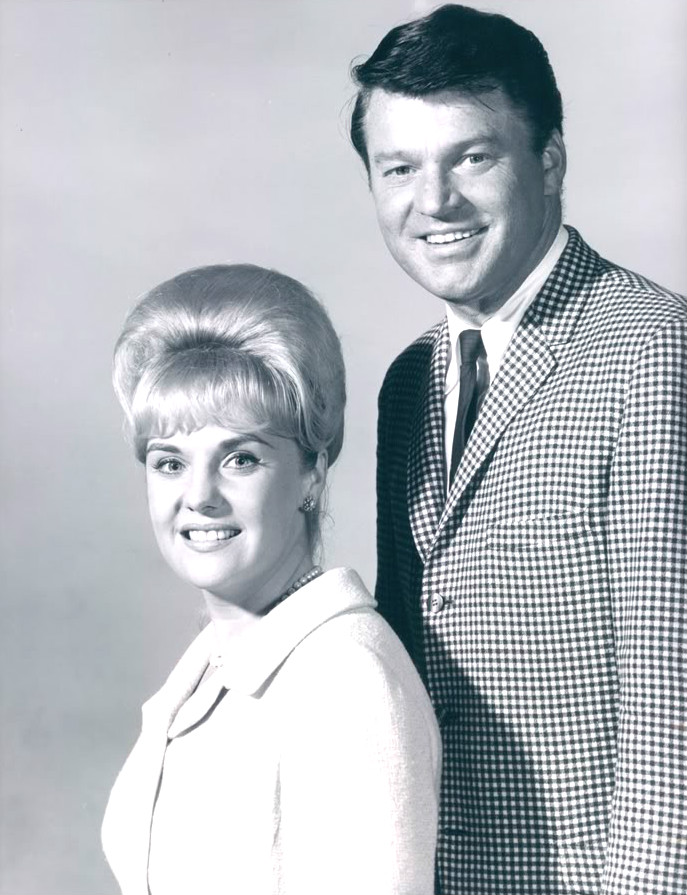
- Molly Bee and Rusty Draper as hosts of the television program Swingin' Country

Background information
- Born: Mollie Gene Beachboard; August 18, 1939 (age 87); Oklahoma City, Oklahoma, U.S.
- Died: February 7, 2009 (aged 69) Oceanside, California, U.S.
- Genres: Country; pop
- Occupations: Singer, television personality
- Instrument: vocals

Molly Bee (born Mollie Gene Beachboard; August 18, 1939 – February 7, 2009), was an American country music singer and guitarist famous for her 1952 recording of the early perennial "I Saw Mommy Kissing Santa Claus" and as Pinky Lee's sidekick on The Pinky Lee Show.

Bee was also well known in the 1950s in Los Angeles as a regular on Hometown Jamboree, a local television program featuring Tennessee Ernie Ford. She also appeared several times on The Ford Show during its run from 1956 to 1961.

== Biography ==
Bee, who was part Native American, was born in Oklahoma City, Oklahoma, on August 18, 1939, and raised in Bell Buckle, Tennessee, until her family and she moved to Tucson, Arizona, sometime in the 1940s. In Arizona, she was discovered by "singing cowboy" Rex Allen, a disc jockey in Tucson, when he heard her singing. Allen was impressed with Bee's voice, and had the 10-year-old sing "Lovesick Blues" on his popular radio show.

In 1950, when Bee was 11, the Beachboard family moved to the Los Angeles area. She became a regular on Hometown Jamboree during the next two years, a KTLA-TV program produced at the Legion Stadium in El Monte, California. It later was moved to the then-famous Harmony Park Ballroom in Anaheim, California.

The Saturday-night stage show was hosted and produced by Cliffie Stone, who helped popularize country music in California. While in her teens, Bee sang on the Jamboree, and gathered a large fan following. She was so popular, the program was sometimes referred to as The Molly Bee Show. The program gave a big break to many young singers, including Tommy Sands, who became a teen idol and dated Bee in the 1950s. When she was 13, Bee signed with Capitol Records and had her first major recording success with "I Saw Mommy Kissing Santa Claus" in 1952. She attended Rosemead High School and graduated from Hollywood High School.

In 1952, Bee was cast to play Pinky Lee's sidekick on the nationally televised children's program The Pinky Lee Show. In 1954, Bee joined Tennessee Ernie Ford in a daytime variety show, which ran from January 3, 1955, to June 28, 1957. Before their performance of "Dim Lights, Thick Smoke (and Loud, Loud Music)", Ford teased Bee about her hair, which she wore in braids, and complimented her "silver bell voice". Ford also coaxed her to yodel, a skill learned on the Tennessee farm where she spent her early years. Thereafter, her yodeling became a feature in most of her early appearances. She was quoted as saying that her nine years with the Tennessee Ernie Ford show were the most enjoyable years of her life; she was home most of the time and got to see her family every day. Bee's number-one hit was followed by three more hit singles, including "The Tennessee Tango". She had gone around the world by the time she was 19 years old.

First appearing on screen in an RKO Pathe short-subject film "Molly Bee Sings", Bee also undertook a brief stage and film acting career in the 1950s and 1960s, appearing in Summer Love, Corral Cuties, Going Steady, Chartroose Caboose, and The Young Swingers, but once said she was "too shy" for an acting career. Bee appeared in 1958 with George Montgomery in an episode of The Gisele MacKenzie Show. She guest-starred on other national television variety shows hosted by Red Foley and Steve Allen.

During the 1960s, Bee was a regular headliner at major Las Vegas showrooms, and briefly toured with Bob Hope's USO troupe. She also made frequent appearances on The Jimmy Dean Show. In 1966, Dick Clark and Barbara John put together the show Swingin' Country that featured three regulars—Bee, Roy Clark, and Rusty Draper. The show gained popularity, and the Armed Forces Radio and Television picked it up to be seen by over 250,000 military personnel worldwide. She was nominated in 1966 as Best Television Personality by The Academy of Country Music Awards.

By the end of the 1960s, her career began to fade; in later years, she blamed her decline on drug abuse. In 1975, in Country Song Roundup magazine, she was quoted as saying that through her children, she found "equilibrium". In the 1970s, Bee reconnected with Cliffie Stone and recorded two more albums to begin her comeback; she played small country bars and venues, very different scenes from the large concert audiences that she had attracted early in her career. Her daughters often performed with her. Bee released the albums Good Golly Ms. Molly in 1975, this time on Stone's Granite record label, and in 1982, her final album, Sounds Fine to Me. Although she was no longer touring, in April 1998, she was part of the playbill putting on a benefit for the Ivey Ranch Park for the physically and mentally handicapped in Oceanside, California.

By the 1990s, she owned a restaurant and night club in Oceanside, known as The Molly Bee. She was quoted as having said, "I've done it all, and lived to tell about it." She remembered working with "incredible people and always into where the action was. I wouldn't trade it for the world. Mine has been like six lifetimes rolled into one."

=== Personal life ===
Bee was married at least five times—she called herself "the Zsa Zsa Gabor of the country music set." She had two daughters, Lia Genn and Bobbi Carey, and one son, Michael Allen. Her marriage to country singer Ira Allen lasted 10 years.

=== Death ===
Bee, who in her later years went by Molly Muncy offstage, died on February 7, 2009, at Tri-City Medical Center in Oceanside from complications following a stroke. She was 69 years old and lived in Carlsbad, California.

== Discography ==
=== Albums ===
Year	Album	US Country	Label
1958	Young Romance		Capitol
1965	It's Great, It's Molly Bee		MGM
1967	Swingin' Country	40	MGM
1975	Good Golly Ms. Molly		Granite
1982	Sounds Fine to Me		Accord

=== Singles ===
Year	Single
1952	"The Tennessee Tango"
1952	"I Saw Mommy Kissing Santa Claus"
1952	"Where Did My Snowman Go?
1953	"Honky-Tonk Mountain" / "Nobody's Lonesome for Me"
1956	"Sweet Shop Sweetheart" / "From the Wrong Side of Town"
1957	"Since I Met You, Baby"/ "I'll Be Waiting for You"
1958	"Going Steady with a Dream"/ "Magic Mirror"
1958	"Don't Look Back"/ "Please Don't Talk About Me When I'm Gone"
1958	"After You've Gone"/"Five Points of a Star"
1962	"Just For the Record"
1963	"All My Love, All My Life"
1963	"I Was Only Kidding"
1963	"Some Tears Fall Dry"
1964	"Our Secret"/"He Doesn't Want You"
1965	"Single Girl Again"/"Keep It a Secret"
1967	"Sinner's Wine"
1974	"She Kept on Talkin'"
1975	"Good Golly Ms. Molly"
1975	"Right or Left at Oak Street"
