= Old Prince Edward County Clerk's Office =

- U.S. National Register of Historic Places
- Virginia Landmarks Register
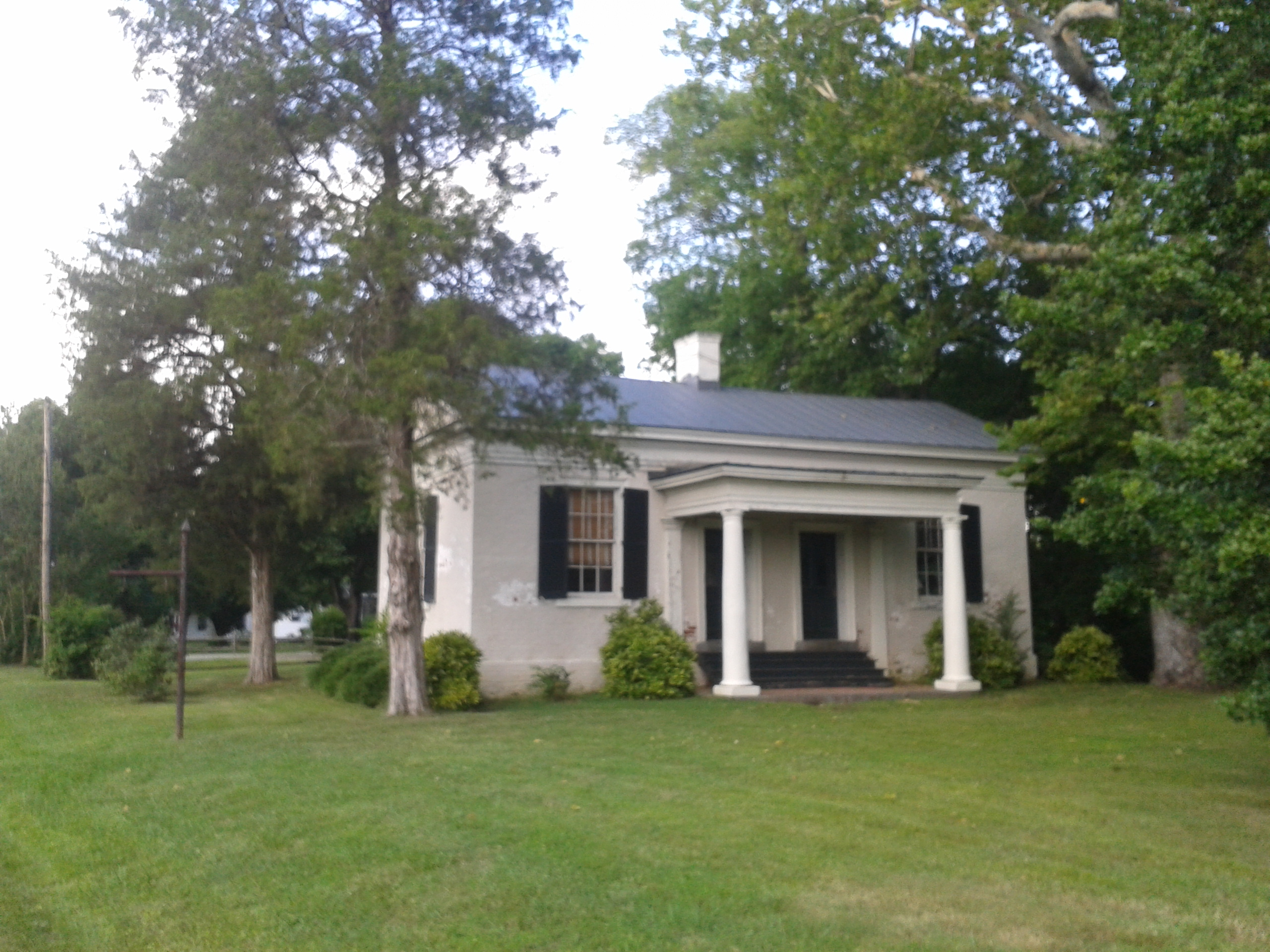
- The Old Prince Edward County Clerk's Office in 2016

- Location within Virginia Location within the United States
- Location: U.S. 15, Worsham, Virginia
- Coordinates: 37°13′43″N 78°26′33″W
- Area: 1.3 acres (0.53 ha)
- Built: 1855
- Architect: Guthrey & Thackston
- Architectural style: Romanesque
- NRHP reference No.: 79003072
- VLR No.: 073-0003

Significant dates
- Added to NRHP: September 10, 1979
- Designated VLR: June 19, 1979

The Old Prince Edward County Clerk's Office is a historic clerk's office located at Worsham, Prince Edward County, Virginia. It was built in 1855, and is a one-story, brick building in the Roman Revival style. It features a one-story front portico with original Tuscan order columns and pilasters. It served as the clerk's office until the county seat moved to Farmville in 1872. It stands across the road from the Debtors' Prison.

It was listed on the National Register of Historic Places in 1979.
