= Chartroose Caboose =

1960 film

- Theatrical release poster
- Directed by: William 'Red' Reynolds
- Screenplay by: Rod Peterson
- Produced by: Stanley W. Daugherty
- Starring: Molly Bee; Ben Cooper; Edgar Buchanan; Michael McGreevey; O. Z. Whitehead; Slim Pickens
- Cinematography: Leonard Clairmont
- Edited by: Ronald V. Ashcroft
- Music by: Darrell Calker
- Production company: Redbill Productions
- Distributed by: Universal Pictures
- Release date: December 28, 1960
- Running time: 75 minutes
- Country: United States
- Language: English

Chartroose Caboose is a 1960 American comedy film directed by William 'Red' Reynolds and written by Rod Peterson. The film stars Molly Bee, Ben Cooper, Edgar Buchanan, Michael McGreevey, O. Z. Whitehead and Slim Pickens. The film was released on December 28, 1960, by Universal Pictures.

== Cast ==
- Molly Bee as Doris Warren
- Ben Cooper as Dub Dawson
- Edgar Buchanan as Woodrow 'Woody' Watts
- Michael McGreevey as Joey James
- O. Z. Whitehead as J.B. King
- Slim Pickens as Pete Harmon
- Kay Bartels as Laura Warren
- Winslow Cuthbert as Pastor Purdy
- Mack Williams as Mr. Warren
- Gilbert Reynolds as Newsboy
