= O. Z. Whitehead =

American actor (1911–1998)

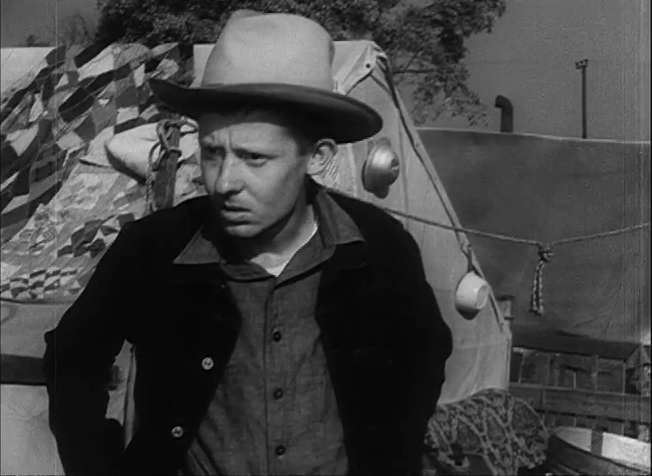
- O.Z. Whitehead as Al Joad in The Grapes of Wrath
- Born: Oothout Zabriskie Whitehead; March 1, 1911; Manhattan, New York City, New York, U.S.
- Died: July 29, 1998 (aged 87); Dublin, Ireland
- Years active: 1935–1997

Oothout Zabriskie Whitehead (March 1, 1911 – July 29, 1998) was an American stage and film character actor. He was born in New York City and attended Harvard University. Called "O.Z." or "Zebby", he also authored several volumes of biographical sketches of early members of the Baháʼí Faith especially in the West after he moved to Dublin, Ireland in 1963.

== Acting career ==
Whitehead began his acting career in the theatre, and made a total of more than 50 performances in films and TV series.

Whitehead first appeared on Broadway in the 1933 debut production of The Lake, staged at the Martin Beck Theatre. This production was notable as being Katharine Hepburn's first Broadway leading role, and Whitehead played in 55 performances between December 1933 and February 1934. He went on to appear in 11 other plays by 1939. Hepburn encouraged his early career. In 1940, Whitehead starred alongside Lillian Gish in a production of Life with Father staged at Chicago's Blackstone Theatre.

The Scoundrel, by Ben Hecht and Charles MacArthur, marked Whitehead's film debut. The movie won a 1936 Oscar for Best Original Story. Whitehead's most famous acting roles include Al Joad (Henry Fonda's younger brother) in The Grapes of Wrath, John Ford's 1940 adaptation of the novel by John Steinbeck and Basil Rathbone's mentally challenged son in the 1958 film The Last Hurrah. The Grapes of Wrath was nominated for, and won, several Oscars.

Whitehead was one of the last surviving members of the John Ford Stock Company of character actors. Along with John Carradine, Donald Meek, Ward Bond, Ben Johnson, Harry Carey, Jr. et al., O. Z. Whitehead was one of the many actors regularly employed by Ford to breathe life into even the smallest roles in his films.

In 1953 Whitehead made his television debut in "The Arrow and the Bow", an episode of Cavalcade of America. He continued with roles in other shows like Gunsmoke (1958's "Lynching Man", where he is lynched), Bonanza (1960), and two episodes of Alfred Hitchcock Presents (1960–61). In 1961 he made a guest appearance on Perry Mason as murderer Harry Beacom in "The Case of the Cowardly Lion." Shortly thereafter, Whitehead moved to Ireland and participated in theatre arts there.

Whitehead won the Best Supporting Actor award at the 1966 Dublin Theatre Festival for his performance in Eugene O'Neill's Hughie, a part he was to reprise at the Peacock until 1989. In 1983 he played the role of American Ambassador David Gray in the RTÉ television drama Caught in a Free State, set in neutral Ireland during World War II. His final role was as the narrator/Voice in the Irish horror film Biological Maintenance Department (1997).

Following his move to Ireland, Whitehead established the "O. Z. Whitehead Award" in 1966, supporting theatre. The first year's winners included Dr. Michael McDonnell, for his play All Gods Die on Friday. Other winners have been Ivy Bannister, Aodhan Madden, and Francis Harvey.

== Personal life ==
As a child, Whitehead was fascinated by films and the theatre. He decided to make acting his career after his father took him to see Charlie Chaplin and Jackie Coogan in The Kid in 1921. After years on the stage, in film and on television, Whitehead struggled in the Hollywood studio system and became dissatisfied with the roles he was given.

A pacifist during World War II, Whitehead first heard of the Baháʼí Faith in 1949. At his first informational meeting on the religion, Whitehead heard well-known researcher Marzieh Gail. Whitehead joined the religion in late 1950 and gave public talks on the religion throughout that decade, such as at World Religion Day observances and other occasions.

Whitehead went on a pilgrimage to Baháʼí's spiritual and administrative center in Haifa in 1955, and attended the first Baháʼí World Congress in London in 1963. That same year, Whitehead pioneered to Dublin, while also taking on theatrical opportunities in the city. He was elected to the Local Spiritual Assembly of Dublin and the National Spiritual Assembly of Ireland following its formation in 1972, and served in that role for 15 years.

From about 1973 through the end of his life, Whitehead devoted much of his time to the concerns of the religion. The results of this work included the authoring of three books collecting biographies of early Baháʼí adherents, which were published during his 60s. Whitehead also supported the Irish Actors' Equity and the Screen Actors' Guild, and served on the executive committee of the Irish branch of the international writers' club, PEN.

== Death ==
Whitehead died of cancer in Dublin in 1998, at the age of 87.

== Partial filmography ==
- The Scoundrel (1935) - Calhoun
- M'Liss (1936) - Sheriff (uncredited)
- The Grapes of Wrath (1940) - Al Joad
- To the Shores of Tripoli (1942) - Marine Recruit (uncredited)
- My Brother Talks to Horses (1947) - Mr. Puddy
- The Romance of Rosy Ridge (1947) - Ninny Nat
- The Pirate (1948) - Hurtada (uncredited)
- A Song Is Born (1948) - Professor Oddly
- Road House (1948) - Arthur
- Family Honeymoon (1948) - Jess (uncredited)
- Ma and Pa Kettle (1949) - Mr. Billings
- One Way Street (1950) - Gas Station Proprietor (uncredited)
- Dallas (1950) - Settler (uncredited)
- The Scarf (1951) - Whoopie (uncredited)
- The Hoodlum (1951) - Breckenridge
- Comin' Round the Mountain (1951) - Zeke
- Journey Into Light (1951) - Lippy
- FBI Girl (1951) - Chauncey - Undertaker
- For Men Only (1952) - Professor Bixby
- The San Francisco Story (1952) - Alfey
- We're Not Married! (1952) - Jeff's Postman (uncredited)
- Beware, My Lovely (1952) - Mr. Franks
- Feudin' Fools (1952) - Yancy Smith
- The Body Beautiful (1953) - Oscar Blunt
- The Last Hurrah (1958) - Norman Cass Jr.
- Rally Round the Flag, Boys! (1958) - Isaac Goodpasture
- The Horse Soldiers (1959) - Hoppy Hopkins
- Chartroose Caboose (1960) - J.B. King
- Alfred Hitchcock Presents (1960) (Season 5 Episode 19: "Not the Running Type") - Mr. Newton
- Alfred Hitchcock Presents (1961) (Season 6 Episode 36: "Final Arrangements") - Simms
- Two Rode Together (1961) - Lieutenant Chase
- The Man Who Shot Liberty Valance (1962) - Herbert Carruthers
- Panic in Year Zero! (1962) - Hogan, Grocery Store Owner
- Summer Magic (1963) - Mr. Perkins
- Ulysses (1967) - Alexander J. Dowie
- The Lion in Winter (1968) - Bishop of Durham
- Philadelphia, Here I Come (1977) - Ben Burton
- Diary of a Madman (1990) - Lunatic
- Hello Stranger (1992) - Head Waiter
- Ailsa (1994) - American tourist

== Publications ==
- Whitehead, O.Z. (1976). Some Early Baháʼís of the West. Oaklands, Welwyn, UK: George Ronald Publisher Ltd. ISBN 978-0-85398-065-0. Archived from the original on 10 May 2017.
- Whitehead, O.Z. (1983). Some Baháʼís to Remember. Oaklands, Welwyn, UK: George Ronald Publisher Ltd. ISBN 978-0-85398-148-0. Archived from the original on 17 May 2016.
- Whitehead, O.Z. (1996). Portraits of some Baháʼí Women. Oaklands, Welwyn, UK: George Ronald Publisher Ltd. ISBN 978-0-85398-403-0. Archived from the original on 17 October 2019.
- He also wrote an autobiographical 35 page chapter in O.Z. Whitehead (1994). Honnold, Annamarie (ed.). Why they became Baha'is - First Generation Baha'is By 1963. New Delhi, India: Baha'i Publishing Trust of India. pp. 204–239. ISBN 978-81-85091-72-3.
