= Memories of El Monte =

1963 song by Frank Zappa and Ray Collins

Single by The Penguins
- B-side: "Be Mine"
- Released: April 8, 1963
- Recorded: 1963; Pal Recording Studio, Cucamonga
- Genre: Doo-wop
- Length: 2:36
- Label: Original Sound
- Songwriters: Frank Zappa, Ray Collins
- Producer: Frank Zappa

The Penguins singles chronology
"Believe Me" / "Pony Rock" (1962)	"Memories of El Monte" / "Be Mine" (1963)	"Heavenly Angel" / "Big Bobo’s Party Train" (1965)

"Memories of El Monte" is a doo-wop song released in 1963 by the Penguins featuring Cleve Duncan. It was written by Frank Zappa and Ray Collins before they were in the Mothers of Invention. The song was first released as Original Sound 27.

== Composition ==
In 1960, Art Laboe released one of the first oldies compilations, Memories of El Monte, a collection of songs by bands that used to play at the dances Laboe organized at Legion Stadium in El Monte, California.

At some point in the next few years, Ray Collins visited Frank Zappa at his house at 314 W. G Street in Ontario, California. Frank told him that he and a friend had thought of writing a song entitled "Memories of El Monte." Ray had been to the dances at El Monte Legion Stadium and had played there with tenor saxophonist Chuck Higgins. Ray sat down at Frank's piano, played the "Earth Angel" chord changes and immediately came up with the first lyrics for "Memories of El Monte."

Frank Zappa took the song to Art Laboe, who loved it. Laboe came up with the idea of adding a section that named doo-wop groups and having the Penguins impersonate their songs.

"Memories of El Monte" was recorded at Paul Buff’s Pal Recording Studio in Cucamonga, California in 1963. The song was copyrighted on February 20, 1963.

== Performers ==
- Cleve Duncan – lead vocals
- Walter Saulsberry – tenor vocals
- The Viceroys – backup vocals
  - James Conwell
  - Andrew "Jack" White
  - Charles Jones
  - Oliver Williams
  - Herbert White
- Frank Zappa – xylophone/vibraphone

Although the track is credited to the Penguins featuring Cleve Duncan, and Zappa claimed it was recorded by "a bunch of guys from the car wash," it was actually sung by Cleve Duncan of the Penguins, backed by the Viceroys.

== Contents ==
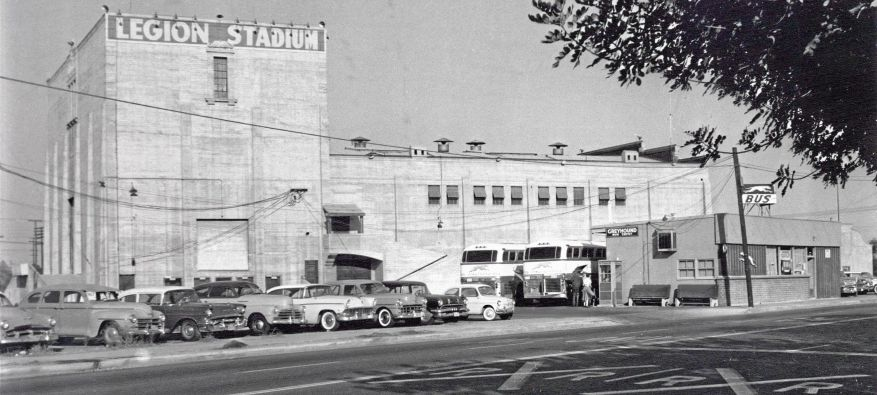
El Monte Legion Stadium, c. mid-1950s

The song reminisces about dances at the El Monte Legion Stadium. It consists of two verses, followed by a spoken section listing a number of songs that would be sung, as excerpts, ending with "Earth Angel", followed by another verse.

It was one of the first songs that Frank Zappa wrote that he was able to get released. It is a doo wop style song. Zappa contended that the music that was happening during the 1950s was one of the finest things in American music.

== Reception ==
"Memories of El Monte" was popular on the radio and sold well in a variety of markets but it did not chart nationally. It was a local hit, and led Cleve Duncan to reform the Penguins, who had broken up around 1959. It is now considered a perennial favorite, and Art Laboe has played it a lot.

Ray Collins has criticized the recording of the song, saying that, "Art Laboe's always had this thing about people recording R&B ballads too slow, I think he overcompensated and made "Memories of El Monte" too fast."

=== Royalties ===
Before his death in 2012, Ray Collins said he still got twice-yearly royalty checks from the song. Frank Zappa used a $1,500 advance against the royalties of "Grunion Run" (recorded by The Hollywood Persuaders) and "Memories of El Monte" to bail his girlfriend out of jail, and to get an attorney.

== Songs Referenced in "Memories of El Monte" ==
- "In the Still of the Night" by The Five Satins
- "You Cheated" by The Shields
- "A Thousand Miles Away" by The Heartbeats
- "The Letter" by The Medallions
- "Cherry Pie" by Marvin & Johnny
- "Nite Owl" by Tony Allen & The Chimes billed as Tony Allen & The Champs
- "Earth Angel" by The Penguins

== Album appearances ==
"Memories of El Monte" was released five times as a single:

Year	B-Side	Record Company	Record Number	Notes
1963	"Be Mine"	Original Sound	OS-27	
1963	"Never Let you Go" by The Five Discs	Chief Records	CH-101	
1984	"Heavenly Angel"	Original Sound	OBG-4504	
1999	"Heavenly Angel"	Collectables Records	COL-4054	This is a reissue of the 1984 single
	"Ballad of a Girl & Boy" by the Question Marks	Million Seller	MS-852	

"Memories of El Monte" appears on a 1984 live LP from Ace Records called Big Jay McNeely Meets the Penguins, as part of a medley with "Earth Angel". The original version also appears on the following compilations:

- Art Laboe's Memories Of El Monte LP (Starla, 1960), (Original Sound, 1991)
- Cucamonga Years – The Early Works Of Frank Zappa (1962–1964) (MSI, Japan, 1991)
- Art Laboe's Dedicated To You (1992)
- Art Laboe's 60 Killer Oldies (1993)
- Oldies But Goodies, Vol. 3 (1994)
- The Doo-Wop Box II (Rhino, 1996)
- Cucamonga! Frank's Wild Years (Musical Tragedies, Germany, 1999)
- Cucamonga (Rhino, 2004)
- You’re an Angel by the Penguins (2010)

== Pop culture references ==
A chapter in the book, Generations of youth: youth cultures and history in twentieth-century America by Joe Austin and Michael Willard, is entitled “Memories of El Monte" Intercultural Dance Halls in Post-World War II Los Angeles.

"Memories of El Monte" was used in the movie Colors. It is the name of an annual oldies show in El Monte. It is also the name of a textbook about El Monte.

When the Mothers of Invention played at The Trip, a club in Los Angeles, they got a lot of requests for "Help, I'm a Rock" and "Memories of El Monte." No one danced during these songs because there are spoken sections which would cause the audience to stop dancing and listen. Elmer Valentine wanted people to dance in his club because if someone looked in the door and saw an empty dance floor they wouldn't come in. One night, the Mothers of Invention played the "Help, I'm a Rock" and "Memories of El Monte" for an hour and no one danced. Immediately after that they were selling pop bottles to get money for cigarettes and bologna.

A recording of the Mothers Of Invention performing "Memories of El Monte" was eventually released in June 2024 on the live archival release Whisky a Go Go, 1968. Both of the song's composers feature on the July 1968 recording; Ray Collins would leave the group for the final time shortly afterwards.
