= Twin Lakes State Park (Virginia) =

State park in Virginia, USA

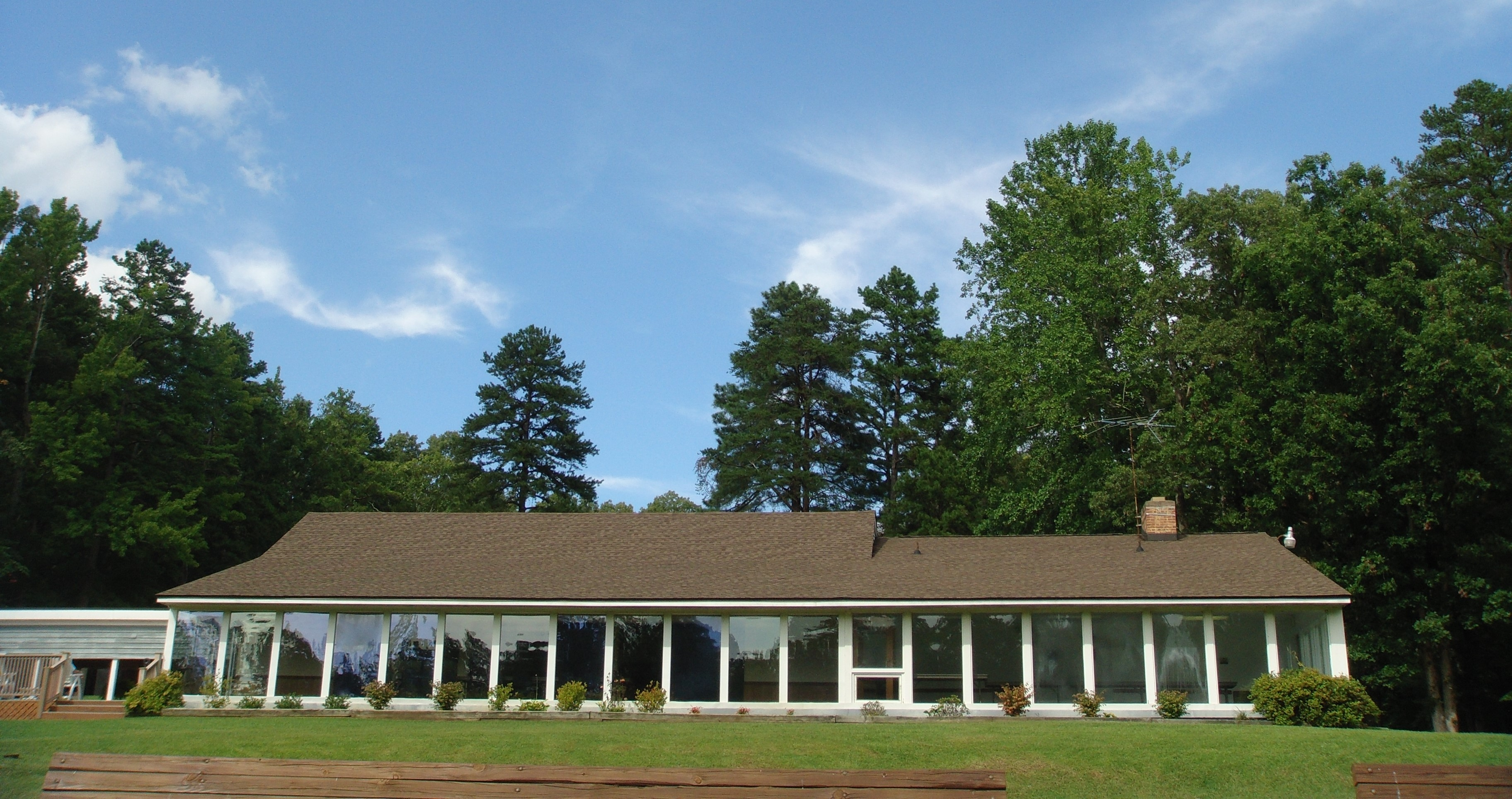
- Cedar Crest Conference Center in the park
- Interactive map of Twin Lakes State Park
- Location: Virginia, United States
- Nearest city: Green Bay
- Coordinates: 37°10′26″N 78°16′25″W
- Area: 495 acres (200 ha)
- Governing body: Virginia Department of Conservation and Recreation
- Twin Lakes State Park
- U.S. National Register of Historic Places
- Virginia Landmarks Register
- NRHP reference No.: 12000906
- VLR No.: 073-0070

Significant dates
- Added to NRHP: October 31, 2012
- Designated VLR: September 18, 2008
- Website: Official website

Twin Lakes State Park (formerly known as Goodwin Lake Park and Prince Edward State Park for Negroes), is a state park in Virginia, United States. It is located in Central Virginia in Prince Edward County. Twin Lakes State Park, centrally located in Virginia's Piedmont region, and has a variety of lakefront activities available, including swimming, camping, fishing, biking, canoeing and hiking. The park is home to Cedar Crest Conference Center, a facility for various indoor uses.

== History ==
The land for Twin Lakes State Park was initially bought from struggling farmers by the federal government during the Great Depression. Two parks, Goodwin Lake and Prince Edward Lake, were founded in 1939 and until the early 1960s were run as two racially segregated parks.

In 1948, businessman Maceo Conrad Martin and his family embarked on a vacation to Staunton River State Park. As expected, Park authorities denied the Martins entry to the state park based on their race. The Martins consulted the Richmond, Virginia-based civil rights law firm of Hill, Tucker and Robinson, led by Oliver Hill. Hill's firm filed a civil suit against the Commonwealth of Virginia under the “separate but equal” doctrine. The suit alleged that Staunton River State Park's policy only allowed white citizens to use its facility, with no accommodations for African Americans. The Virginia Department of Conservation and Development first responded by converting a segregated African-American/"Colored Only" recreation area into a state park facility: the "Prince Edward State Park for Negroes" (now the Twin Lakes State Park). In 1949, Virginia Governor William Tuck allotted $195,000 to create 6 housekeeping cabins, an expanded swimming area, expanded parking, a bathhouse, and concession stand.

Opened to the general "Colored Only/African-Americans Only" public in June 1950, Prince Edward State Park for Negroes became Virginia's eighth state park and the only pre-Civil Rights Era state park for African-Americans. African Americans from across the mid-Atlantic states visited the park for its swimming, recreation, camping and dancing.

The parks merged in 1976 and became Twin Lakes State Park in 1986.

In 1995, Virginia erected a marker to acknowledge his lawsuit's contribution to desegregating the park. The marker reads:

Prince Edward State Park for Negroes was established in 1950 one mile west on the site of the former Prince Edward Lake Recreation Area for Negroes. Maceo C. Martin, an African American from Danville, sued the state when he was denied access to Staunton River State Park. Governor William M. Tuck funded the new park to provide "similar and equal" facilities in lieu of access. The park, with a black superintendent, was operated separately from neighboring Goodwin Lake Recreation Area until the passage of the Civil Rights Act of 1964. The two parks merged in 1986 to form Twin Lakes State Park.

== See also ==
- List of Virginia state parks
- List of Virginia state forests
