= Merrill Moore (musician) =

American jazz musician

Merrill Everett Moore (26 September 1923 – 14 June 2000) was an American swing and boogie-woogie pianist and bandleader whose style influenced rockabilly music during the 1950s.

He was born in Algona, Iowa, and learned piano as a child. By the age of 12 he was performing occasionally on a Des Moines radio station. After leaving school he joined the Chuck Hall Band, which played in local ballrooms, before serving in the US Navy during World War II. He then married, and moved with his wife to Tucson, Arizona and then San Diego, where he worked as a clothes salesman and performed in clubs, often with guitarist Arkie Geurin. He became a full-time musician in 1950, and formed his own band, the Saddle, Rock and Rhythm Boys, who played boogie-woogie and Western swing at the Buckaroo Club. He signed with Capitol Records in 1952 and recorded a string of singles, the most successful of which was a version of "The House of Blue Lights" in 1953. Ken Nelson of Capitol Records invited him to take part in a national tour, but Jimmy Kennedy, the owner of the Buckaroo Club, refused to allow Moore to break his contract to take part.

According to Steve Huey of Allmusic, Moore's "unique style fused Western swing, boogie-woogie, and early R&B in a melting pot that many critics felt was a distinct influence on rockabilly, especially Jerry Lee Lewis." His music was later highly regarded by rockabilly fans, especially in Europe, although Moore himself said: "We didn't have the idea we were pioneering anything. We were just trying to make a living.... Rock and roll to me was a completely different sound. The rhythm section was incomplete, it was too hard, and it didn't swing...."

Moore continued to record for Capitol in the 1950s, but in 1955 walked out on his contract with Kennedy and moved to Los Angeles. There, he became a regular, along with Tennessee Ernie Ford, on Cliffie Stone's radio program Hometown Jamboree, and also worked as a session pianist for Capitol, appearing on records by Tommy Sands, Johnny Cash, Faron Young, Kay Starr and others. In 1962 he moved back to San Diego, and returned to playing hotels and clubs.

He died from cancer in 2000, at the age of 76.

== Discography ==
Year	Name	Label	Type	Number
Albums
1967	Bellyful Of Blue-Thunder	Ember Records	LP	EMB 3392
1968	Rough-House 88	Ember Records	LP	EMB 3394
1969	Tree Top Tall	B & C Records	LP	CAS 1001
1980	Merrill Moore's Music	M & D Records	LP	LP 2856
Singles and EP's
1953	Red Light / Bartender's Blues	Capitol Records	7", Single	F2386
1953	The House Of Blue Lights / Bell Bottom Boogie	Capitol Records	7", Single	F2574
1954	Fly Right Boogie / Nola	Capitol Records	7", Single	F2796
1954	Ten, Ten A.M. / Doggie House Boogie	Capitol Records	7", Single	F2924
1954	Snatchin' And Grabbin' / Sweet Jennie Lee!	Capitol Records	7", Single	F2691
1955	Cow Cow Boogie / Rock-Rockola	Capitol Records	7", Single	F3034
1955	Down The Road A Piece / Cooing To The Wrong Pigeon	Capitol Records	7", Single	F3311
1955	It's A One Way Door / Yes, Indeed album	Capitol Records	7", Single	F3140
1955	Hard Top Race / Five Foot Two, Eyes Of Blue	Capitol Records	7", Single	F3226
1956	Gotta Gimme What'cha Got / She's Gone	Capitol Records	7", Single	F3563
1956	Rock Island Line / King Porter Stomp	Capitol Records	7", Single	F3397
1957	Merrill Moore	Capitol Records	7", EP	EAP 1-608
1957	Barrel House Bessie / Tuck Me To Sleep In My Old 'Tucky Home	Capitol Records	7", Single	3721
1968	Down The Road A Piece / Buttermilk Baby	Ember Records	7", Single	EMB S 253
1969	Sweet Mama Tree Top Tall / Little Green Apples	B & C Records	7", Single	CB-100
