= Worsham High School =

Historic high school in Virginia, United States

- U.S. National Register of Historic Places
- Virginia Landmarks Register
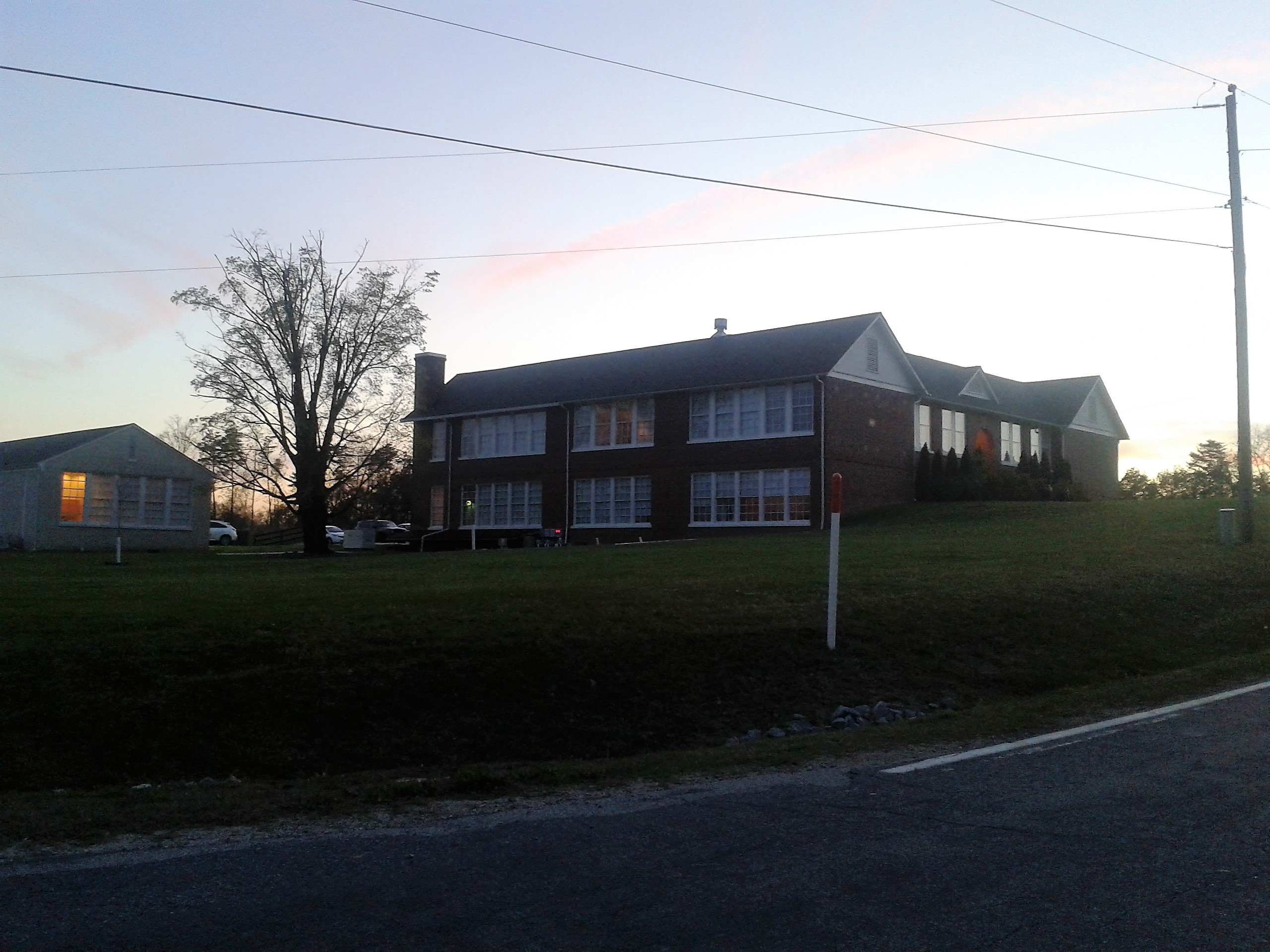
- The former high school building at dusk, April 2017

- Location within Virginia Location within the United States
- Location: 8832 Abilene Rd, near Farmville, Virginia
- Coordinates: 37°13′49″N 78°26′47″W
- Area: 8.9 acres (3.6 ha)
- Built: 1927, 1963-1964
- Architectural style: Colonial Revival
- NRHP reference No.: 10000384
- VLR No.: 073-5064

Significant dates
- Added to NRHP: June 24, 2010
- Designated VLR: March 18, 2010

Worsham High School, also known as Worsham Elementary and High School and Worsham School, is a historic high school complex located near Farmville, Prince Edward County, Virginia. It was built in 1927, and is a one- to two-story, banked brick building with a recessed, arched entrance showing influences from the Colonial Revival style. The school contains 12 classrooms on two floors arranged in a "U" around a central auditorium/classroom. Also on the property are the contributing agriculture building and cannery, both rectangular cinder block buildings built about 1927. In 1963–1964, the Worsham School was one of four County schools leased by the Prince Edward Free School system, a privately organized but federally supported organization providing free schooling for the African-American students of Prince Edward County.

It was listed on the National Register of Historic Places in 2010.
