= Meherrin, Virginia =

Unincorporated community in Virginia, United States

- Unincorporated community
- Location within Virginia Location within the United States
- Coordinates: 37°06′12″N 78°22′00″W
- Country: United States
- State: Virginia
- County: Lunenburg and Prince Edward
- Time zone: UTC−5 (Eastern (EST))
  - Summer (DST): UTC−4 (EDT)
- ZIP code: 23954

Meherrin is a small unincorporated community in Lunenburg and Prince Edward counties in the U.S. state of Virginia. It is approximately 18.6 miles (29.9 km) by road south of Farmville.

Locally, the village is known for its 4th of July Celebration and Friday night Bingos, which are both hosted by the Meherrin Volunteer Fire Department.

Nearby colleges include Longwood University, Hampden-Sydney College, and Southside Virginia Community College. Nearby schools are Prince Edward County Public Schools, Lunenburg County Public Schools, Charlotte County Public Schools, and Fuqua School (Private).

Meherrin was originally named Moore's Ordinary. It was named for George Moore in August 1748 when he was granted a license by the Amelia Court to operate an "ordinary" tavern (a tavern that provided ordinary needs for travellers). In 1852 the Richmond-Danville railroad reached Meherrin and built the Meherrin Depot, named for the tribe of Indians that lived there and along the Meherrin River.

== Demographics ==
As of 2000, the total population of zip code 23954 was 1,838. The racial breakdown was as follows: 48.3% White, 49.6% Black or African-American, 0.5% American Indian or Alaskan Native, 0.2% Asian, 0.2% Other, and 1.3% two or more races. As for education for ages 25 and over, 64.1% were high school graduates or higher and 9.3% had a bachelor's degree or higher. The median household income was $30,147.

== Roy Clark ==
Meherrin is the birthplace and childhood home of Roy Clark, a country singer and musician known for his appearances in the television show "Hee Haw", who died of complications of pneumonia on Nov. 15, 2018, at his home in Tulsa, Oklahoma.
