= Green Bay, Prince Edward County, Virginia =

Unincorporated community in Virginia, United States

Green Bay
- Unincorporated community
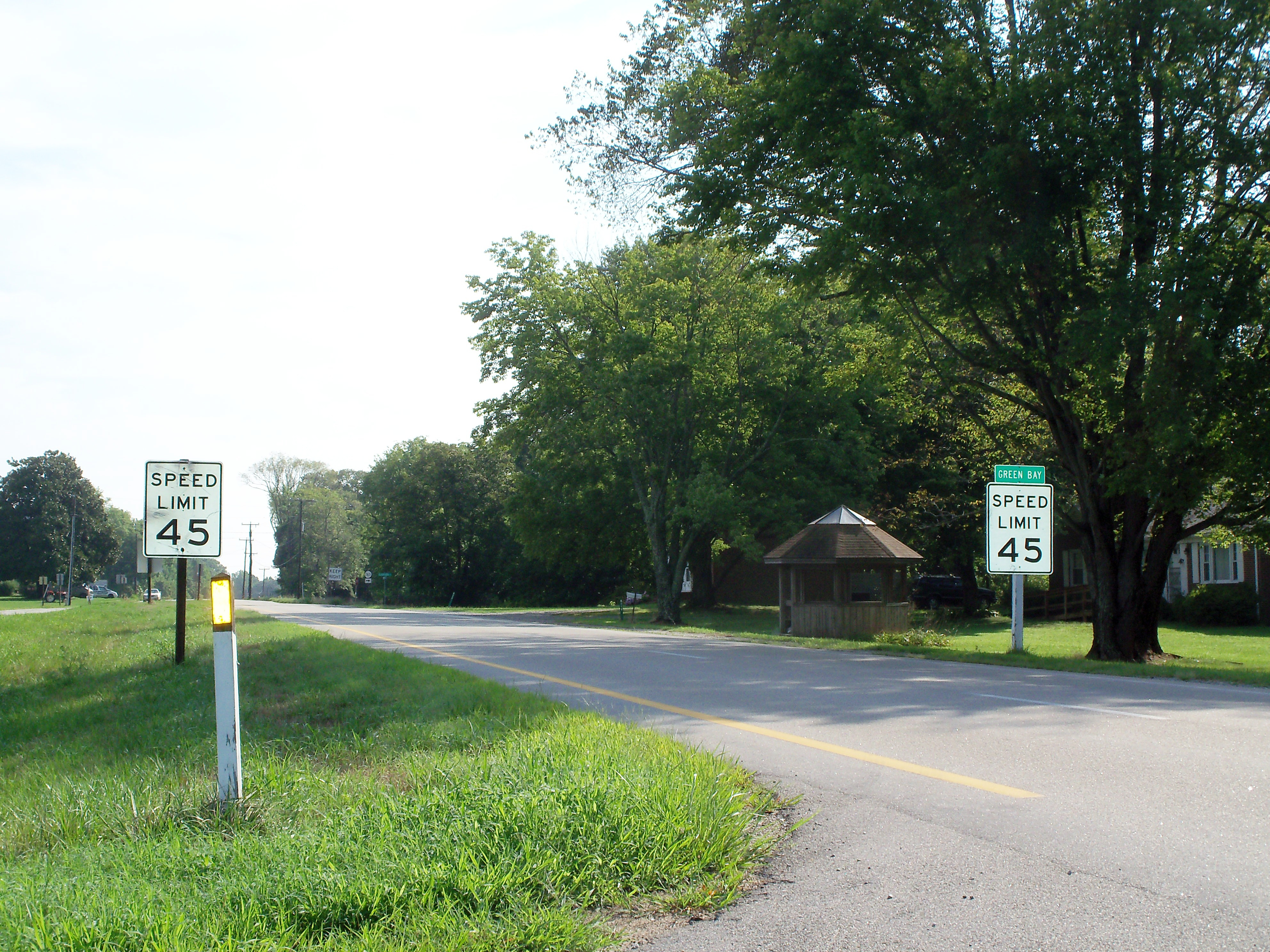

- Location within the Commonwealth of Virginia Green Bay (the United States)
- Coordinates: 37°8′2″N 78°18′53″W
- Country: United States
- State: Virginia
- County: Prince Edward
- Time zone: UTC−5 (Eastern (EST))
  - Summer (DST): UTC−4 (EDT)

Green Bay is an unincorporated community in Prince Edward County, Virginia, United States, located on US Highway 360 between Burkeville and Keysville. Peach growing in the area was very successful during the 1930s and 1940s, but finally succumbed to the advancement of larger growers and the change in technique and labor availabilities. Rail access was a mainline by Norfolk and Western Railway and also the Southern Railway which have merged to form Norfolk Southern.

Twin Lakes State Park is located close to Green Bay. Formerly the racially-segregated Goodwin Lake and Prince Edward Lake, the two parks merged in 1976 and adopted the current name in 1986.
