= Cliffie Stone =

American singer-songwriter (1917–1998)

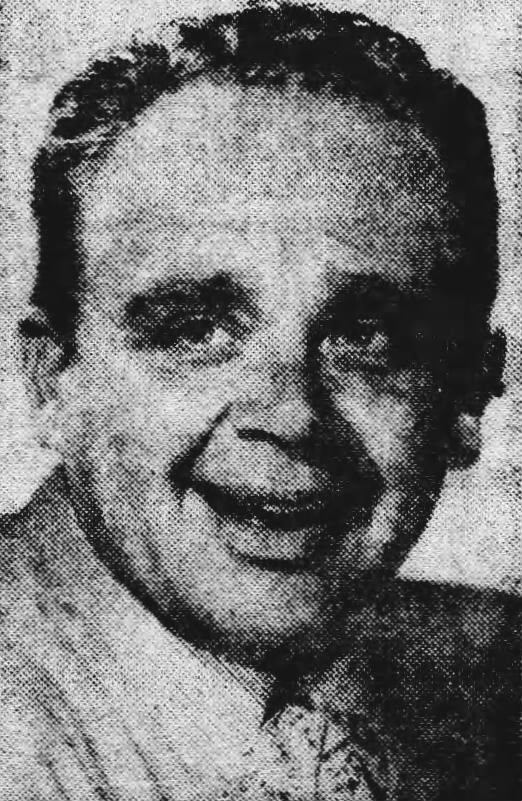
- Publicity photo of Cliffie Stone, circa 1952

Background information
- Born: Clifford Gilpin Snyder; March 1, 1917; Stockton, California, United States
- Died: January 17, 1998 (aged 80) Santa Clarita, California, United States
- Genres: Country
- Occupations: Singer; musician; record producer; music publisher; radio personality; television presenter
- Labels: Capitol Records

Clifford Gilpin Snyder (March 1, 1917 – January 17, 1998), professionally Cliffie Stone, was an American country singer, musician, record producer, music publisher, and radio and TV personality who was pivotal in the development of California's thriving country music scene after World War II during a career that lasted six decades. He was inducted into the Country Music Hall of Fame in 1989.

== Biography ==
Stone was born in Stockton, California, United States. His father was a country musician billed as Herman the Hermit. The family moved to Burbank, and early in his life, he played bass in the big bands of Freddie Slack and Anson Weeks in Southern California, as well as working at local radio stations KXLA, KFI, KFVD, KFWB, and KFOX-AM 1280 in Long Beach. Starting in 1935, Stone appeared on the Los Angeles–based radio shows Covered Wagon Jubilee, Hollywood Barn Dance, Dinner Bell Roundup, and Lucky Stars, singing as well as performing comedy routines and acting as host and DJ in the mid-1940s. In 1939, he married his first wife, Dorothy, and they had four children.

Stone began working at Capitol Records in 1946 and became an A&R man there; among the talents he discovered were Tennessee Ernie Ford (for whom he acted as manager from 1947 to 1957), Cathie Taylor, Molly Bee, Hank Thompson, and Stan Freberg. He also worked regularly with Merle Travis after his relocation from Nashville to Hollywood. Stone was instrumental in helping various young musicians get their start in television, such as guitarist Zane Ashton (aka Bill Aken), who would also write songs for Stone's Central Songs publishing firm. His Hometown Jamboree premiered as a weekly TV broadcast in December 1949 over KLAC-TV/KCOP-TV in Los Angeles; in 1953, it moved to KTLA-TV, where it replaced a competing program hosted by Spade Cooley and itself ran until cancellation in 1959.

Stone's career at Capitol was successful, but he was ultimately better known for his successes in radio. He recorded six albums with a backing band which went under various names, including Cliffie Stone & His Orchestra, Cliffie Stone & His Barn Dance Band, Cliffie Stone & His Hometown Jamboree Gang, Cliffie Stone & His Hepcats, and Cliffie Stone's Country Hombres. His 1955 hit, "The Popcorn Song", peaked at No. 14 on Billboard magazine's singles chart in 1955.

== Personal life and death ==
By the 1960s, Stone was doing well in music publishing with his company, Central Songs, and for a short period launched a label called Granite Records. Stone's son, Curtis Stone, played in Highway 101. His first wife, Dorothy, died in 1989, and he married songwriter Joan Carol. Cliffie Stone died from a heart attack on January 17, 1998, at his Santa Clarita, California, home.

== Chart singles ==
Year	Single	Chart Positions	
Year	Single	US Country	US
1947	"Silver Stars, Purple Sage, Eyes of Blue" (Cliffie Stone & His Orchestra)	4	—
1948	"Peepin' Thru the Keyhole (Watching Jole Blon)" (Cliffie Stone & His Barn Dance Band)	4	—
1948	"When My Blue Moon Turns to Gold Again" (Cliffie Stone & His Orchestra)	11	—
1955	"The Popcorn Song" (Cliffie Stone & His Hepcats)	—	14

=== Guest singles ===
Year	Single	Artist	Chart Positions
Year	Single	Artist	US Country
1966	"Little Pink Mack"	Kay Adams (with the Cliffie Stone Group)	30
