= Prince Edward County, Virginia =

County in Virginia, United States

- County
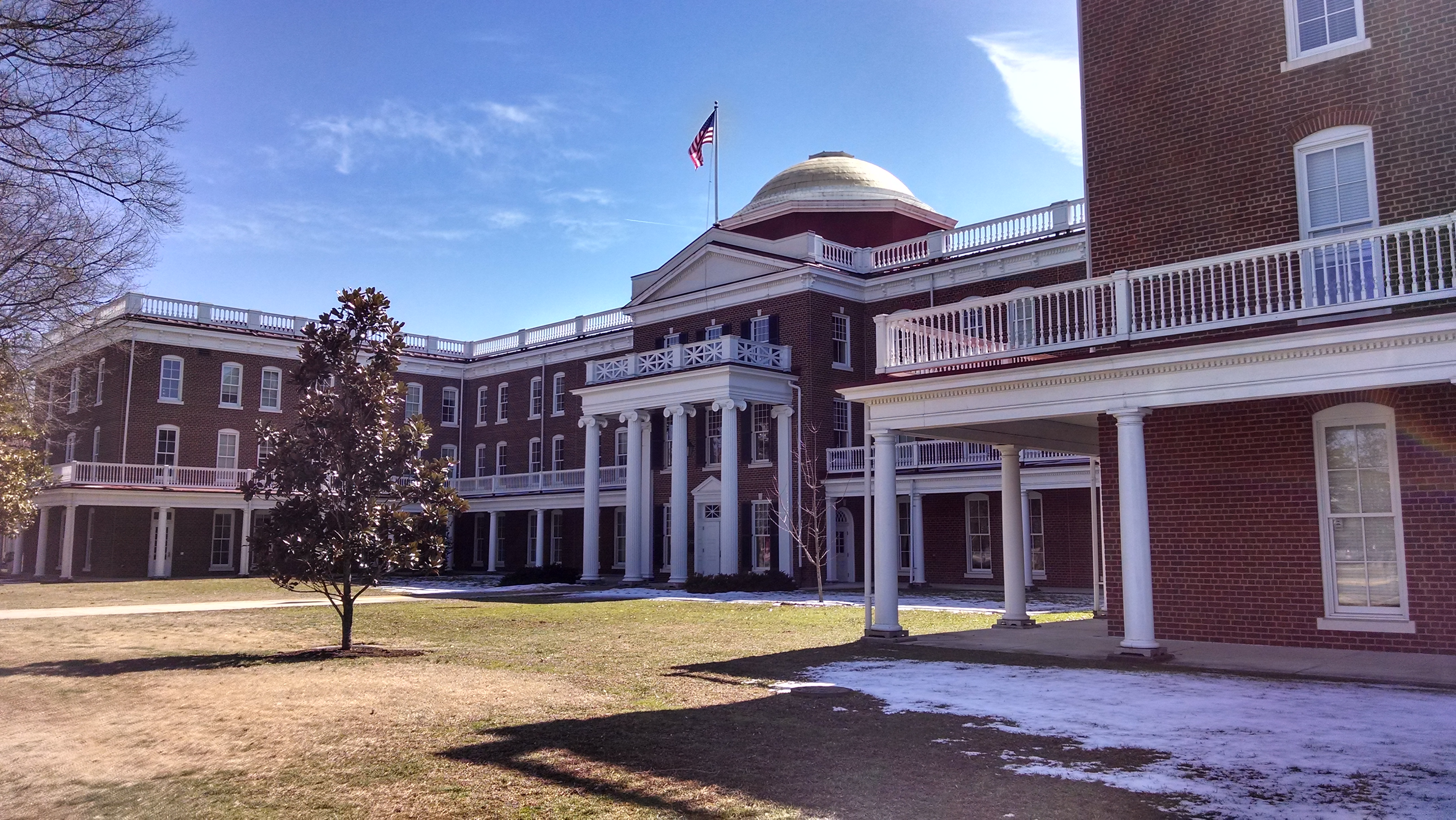
- The Rotunda at Longwood University in Farmville.

- Flag Seal

- Location within the U.S. state of Virginia
- Coordinates: 37°13′N 78°26′W
- Country: United States
- State: Virginia
- Founded: 1754
- Named for: Prince Edward, Duke of York and Albany
- Seat: Farmville
- Largest town: Farmville

Area
  - Total: 354 sq mi (920 km^{2})
  - Land: 350 sq mi (910 km^{2})
  - Water: 3.9 sq mi (10 km^{2}) 1.1%

Population (2020)
  - Total: 21,849
  - Estimate (2025): 22,391 ▲
  - Density: 62/sq mi (24/km^{2})
- Time zone: UTC−5 (Eastern)
  - Summer (DST): UTC−4 (EDT)
- Congressional district: 5th
- Website: www.co.prince-edward.va.us

Prince Edward County is located in the Commonwealth of Virginia. As of the 2020 census, the population was 21,849. Its county seat is Farmville.

== History ==
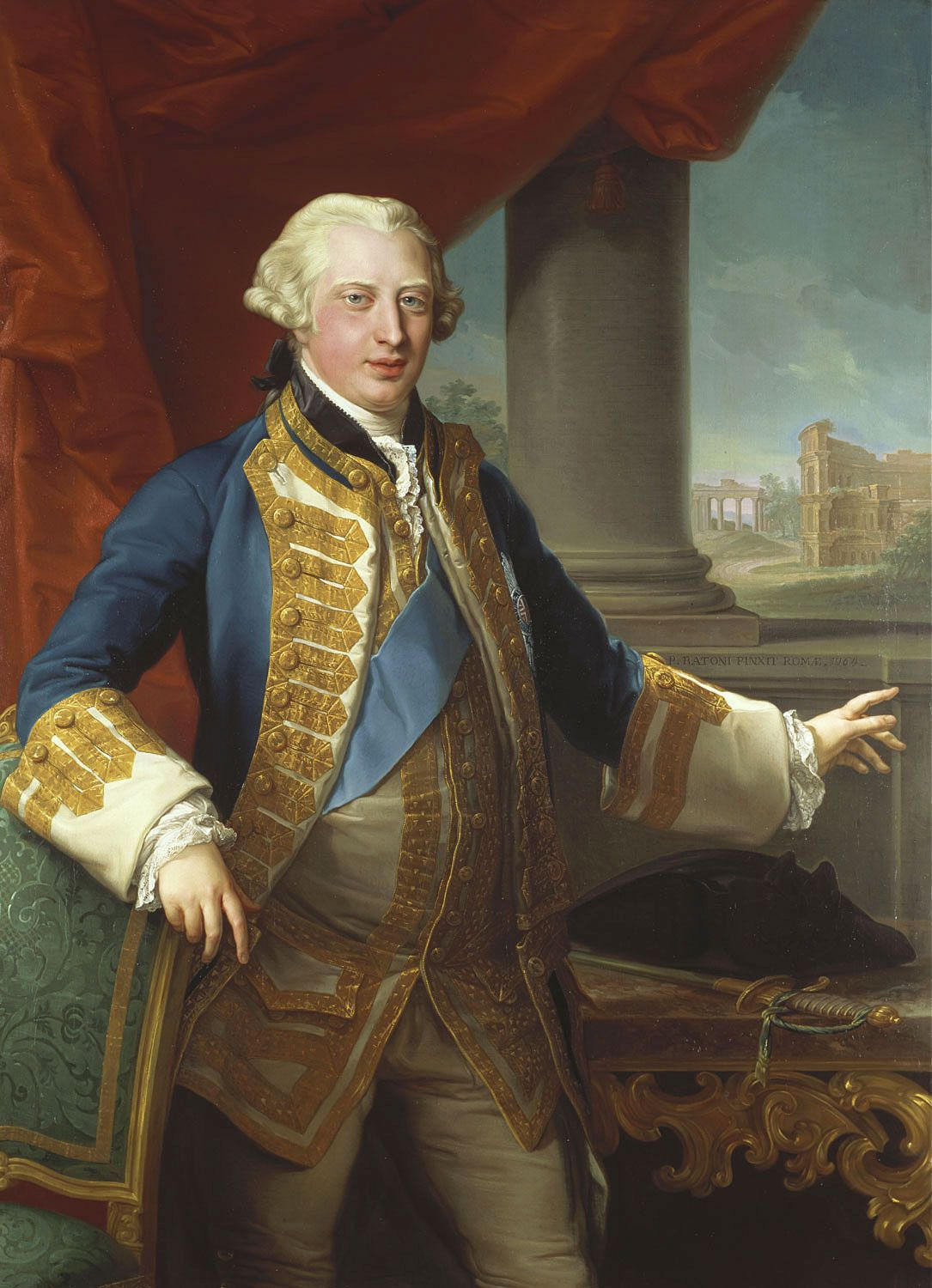
Portrait of the Duke of York by Pompeo Batoni, 1764. Prince Edward, Duke of York and Albany, for whom the county was named

=== Formation and county seats ===
Prince Edward County was formed in the Virginia Colony in 1754 from Amelia County. It was named for Prince Edward, second son of Frederick, Prince of Wales, and younger brother of George III of the United Kingdom.

The original county seat housed the courthouse and was called Prince Edward Courthouse; it is now the village of Worsham.

Near the headwaters of the Appomattox River, the Town of Farmville was formed in 1798 and was incorporated in 1912. The county seat was moved from Worsham to Farmville in 1871.

=== Railroads ===
In the 1850s, the Southside Railroad between Petersburg and Lynchburg was built through Farmville between Burkeville and Pamplin City. The route, which was subsidized by a contribution from Farmville, required an expensive crossing of the Appomattox River slightly downstream which became known as the High Bridge.

The Southside Railroad was heavily damaged during the American Civil War. The High Bridge played a key role during Confederate General Robert E. Lee's final retreat from Petersburg to Appomattox Courthouse, where the surrender to Union General Ulysses S. Grant took place in April 1865.

After the Civil War, under the leadership of former Confederate General William "Billy" Mahone, the Southside Railroad was rebuilt. In 1870, it was combined with the Norfolk and Petersburg Railroad and the Virginia and Tennessee Railroad to form Mahone's Atlantic, Mississippi and Ohio Railroad (AM&O), which extended 400 miles across the southern tier of Virginia from Norfolk on Hampton Roads to Bristol. After the Financial Panic of 1873, the AM&O fell into default on its debt; it was purchased in the early 1880s by new owners who renamed it the Norfolk and Western (N&W). In 1982, it became part of the current Norfolk Southern Railway system.

Due to the high cost of maintaining the High Bridge over the Appomattox River, the line through Farmville was downgraded and eventually abandoned, in favor of the Farmville Belt Line, which had been built on a more direct line between Burkeville and Pamplin City, as had originally been envisioned in the planning for the Southside Railroad.

Another railroad formerly served Farmville. In the late 19th century, the narrow gauge Farmville and Powhatan Railroad was built from Farmville through Cumberland, Powhatan, and Chesterfield counties to reach Bermuda Hundred on the navigable portion of the James River near its confluence with the Appomattox River at City Point. It was later renamed the Tidewater and Western Railroad, but was dismantled in the early 20th century.

=== Desegregation ===
Prince Edward County is the source of Davis v. County School Board of Prince Edward County, a case incorporated into Brown v. Board of Education, which ultimately resulted in the U.S. Supreme Court decision that racially segregated public schools were unconstitutional. This ultimately led to the desegregation of all U.S. public schools. Among the five cases decided under Brown, Davis was the only one initiated by students, after they walked out in 1951 to protest overcrowding and poor conditions at their segregated school under Jim Crow laws.

The all-black R.R. Moton High School, named after Robert Russa Moton, a noted educator from neighboring Amelia County, did not have a gymnasium, cafeteria, or teachers' restrooms. Due to overcrowding, three plywood buildings had been erected, and some students had to take classes in a school bus parked outside. Teachers and students did not have desks or blackboards. The school's requests for additional funds were denied by the all-white school board. On Monday, April 23, 1951, Barbara Johns, the sixteen-year-old niece of Reverend Vernon Johns, a civil rights activist, led students who staged a walkout protesting the conditions. The NAACP took up their case when the students agreed to petition for an integrated school rather than improved conditions at their black school. This vote passed by one count. Howard University-trained attorneys Spottswood W. Robinson and Oliver Hill filed suit against the county school system on behalf of the students. As in other Southern states, since the turn of the twentieth century black voters in Virginia had been largely disenfranchised, which resulted in their lacking political power.

In Davis v. County School Board of Prince Edward County, a state court rejected the suit, agreeing with defense attorney T. Justin Moore that Virginia was vigorously equalizing conditions in black and white schools. The state verdict was appealed to the U.S. District Court, which ruled for the plaintiffs, a decision the school district and the state appealed. Subsequently, it was one of five cases incorporated into Brown v. Board of Education, the landmark case in which the U.S. Supreme Court in 1954 ruled that segregated public schools were unconstitutional.

=== Massive Resistance ===
In 1956, the Virginia General Assembly passed a series of laws (the Stanley Plan) to implement Massive Resistance, a policy promoted by the Byrd Organization led by U.S. Senator Harry F. Byrd, to avoid compliance with the Supreme Court ruling in Brown and its direction to integrate public schools.

The state legislature (overwhelmingly dominated by whites since disfranchisement of African Americans in the state in the early 1900s) created a program of "tuition grants," which could be given to students so they could attend a private school of their choice. In practice, this meant state support of all-white schools that were developed as a way to evade integration of public schools. These newly formed schools became known as the "segregation academies".

As a result of the Brown decision, and changes in Virginia laws, in 1959, the Board of Supervisors for Prince Edward County refused to appropriate any funds at all for the County School Board. It effectively closed all public schools rather than integrate them. The Prince Edward County Public Schools remained closed for five years. While other Virginia and some southern school systems resisted integration, Prince Edward County was the only school district in the country to resort to such extreme measures.

During the interruption in access to Prince Edward County's public schools, white parents established the Prince Edward Foundation. It founded a series of private schools restricted to white children. These schools were supported by the tuition grants from the state and tax credits from the county. Collectively they became known as "Prince Edward Academy", one of Virginia's "segregation academies". Prince Edward Academy operated as the de facto school system and enrolled K-12 students at a number of facilities throughout the county.

From 1959 to 1964, black students in Prince Edward County had to go to school elsewhere or forgo their education altogether. Some got schooling by living with relatives in nearby communities or at makeshift schools the community created in church basements. Others were educated out of state with funds raised by groups such as the Quakers. In the final year (1963–1964), the NAACP-sponsored Prince Edward Free School picked up some of the slack by educating some of the black youth who had been unable to leave the county to attend public schools elsewhere.

In 1963, federal district courts ordered the public schools to open; Prince Edward County appealed to the U.S. Supreme Court. Ruling in Griffin v. County School Board of Prince Edward County, the Court unanimously agreed in May 1964 that Prince Edward County's actions violated the Equal Protection Clause of the 14th Amendment. At that point, county and state supervisors gave in rather than risk prosecution and prison, ending the era of Massive Resistance in Virginia.

The same summer, following the Griffith ruling, 16 students from Queens College (New York) ventured south to Prince Edward County during their "Student Help Project" Program, a precursor to the 1964 Mississippi Freedom Summer. The students served as teachers to the many African-American children who had been denied an education. These volunteers worked with the students to prepare them to resume classes when schools reopened that fall. The volunteers from Queens College were housed among leading African-American families in the county that summer. They used local churches as school houses during the week. Many of the students involved in the program have since donated their archives to the Queens College Department of Special Collections and Archives.

As a result of Prince Edward County's actions, some students missed part or all of their education for five years. This group has been called the "Lost Generation" of Prince Edward County's youth.

=== Private education since 1964 ===
Even after the re-opening of the public schools, Prince Edward Academy remained segregated. Many of the segregated academies in Virginia eventually closed; others changed their missions and eliminated discriminatory policies. Some yielded on integration only after the Internal Revenue Service (IRS) revoked the tax-free status of non-profit discriminatory private schools. Prince Edward Academy was one of the latter and lost its tax-exempt status in 1978. In 1986, the school began to accept all students regardless of race or ethnicity. It was renamed the Fuqua School in 1992, in honor of J. B. Fuqua, a wealthy businessman who was born in Farmville and was a strong supporter of the school in its early years. Fuqua remains the only large private school in Prince Edward County, but a few other smaller private schools have been opened in recent decades.

=== Robert Russa Moton Museum ===
The former R.R. Moton High School building in Farmville has been recognized as a nationally significant community landmark. In 1998, it was designated a National Historic Landmark. It now houses the Robert Russa Moton Museum, a center for the study of civil rights in education.

== Geography ==
According to the U.S. Census Bureau, the county has a total area of 354 square miles (920 km^{2}), of which 350 square miles (910 km^{2}) is land and 3.9 square miles (10 km^{2}) (1.1%) is water. Most of the county's streams drain into the Appomattox River, a tributary of the James River, but in the southeastern corner of the county, streams drain via the Nottoway River into the Chowan River and thence into Albemarle Sound in North Carolina. The highest point in the county is the top of Leighs Mountain at 714 feet above sea level.

=== Adjacent counties ===
- Cumberland County – north
- Buckingham County – northwest
- Amelia County – northeast
- Appomattox County – west
- Nottoway County – east
- Charlotte County – southwest
- Lunenburg County – southeast

=== Major highways ===
- US 15 (Farmville Rd; merges with US 460 to bypass Farmville. US Business 15 goes through the town of Farmville)
- US 360 (Patrick Henry Hwy)
- US 460 (Prince Edward Hwy)
- SR 45 (N. Main St in Farmville)
- SR 307 (Holly Farms Rd)
- SR 133 (Kingsville Rd)

== Demographics ==
Historical population
Census	Pop.	Note	%±
1790	8,100		—
1800	10,962		35.3%
1810	12,409		13.2%
1820	12,577		1.4%
1830	14,107		12.2%
1840	14,069		−0.3%
1850	11,857		−15.7%
1860	11,844		−0.1%
1870	12,004		1.4%
1880	14,668		22.2%
1890	14,694		0.2%
1900	15,045		2.4%
1910	14,266		−5.2%
1920	14,767		3.5%
1930	14,520		−1.7%
1940	14,922		2.8%
1950	15,398		3.2%
1960	14,121		−8.3%
1970	14,379		1.8%
1980	16,456		14.4%
1990	17,320		5.3%
2000	19,720		13.9%
2010	23,368		18.5%
2020	21,849		−6.5%
2025 (est.)	22,391	▲	2.5%
U.S. Decennial Census; 1790–1960 1900–1990; 1990–2000 2010 2020

=== Racial and ethnic composition ===
Prince Edward County, Virginia – Racial and ethnic composition Note: the US Census treats Hispanic/Latino as an ethnic category. This table excludes Latinos from the racial categories and assigns them to a separate category. Hispanics/Latinos may be of any race.
Race / Ethnicity (NH = Non-Hispanic)	Pop 1980	Pop 1990	Pop 2000	Pop 2010	Pop 2020	% 1980	% 1990	% 2000	% 2010	% 2020
White alone (NH)	10,150	10,856	12,180	14,544	10,513	61.68%	62.68%	61.76%	62.24%	48.12%
Black or African American alone (NH)	6,100	6,235	7,014	7,668	9,194	37.07%	36.00%	35.57%	32.81%	42.08%
Native American or Alaska Native alone (NH)	9	29	32	60	33	0.05%	0.17%	0.16%	0.26%	0.15%
Asian alone (NH)	44	77	104	203	196	0.27%	0.44%	0.53%	0.87%	0.90%
Native Hawaiian or Pacific Islander alone (NH)	x	x	19	15	0	x	x	0.10%	0.06%	0.00%
Other race alone (NH)	27	9	20	33	61	0.16%	0.05%	0.10%	0.14%	0.28%
Mixed race or Multiracial (NH)	x	x	165	320	764	x	x	0.84%	1.37%	3.50%
Hispanic or Latino (any race)	126	114	186	525	1,088	0.77%	0.66%	0.94%	2.25%	4.98%
Total	16,456	17,320	19,720	23,368	21,849	100.00%	100.00%	100.00%	100.00%	100.00%

=== 2020 census ===
As of the 2020 census, the county had a population of 21,849. The median age was 35.7 years. 15.9% of residents were under the age of 18 and 18.6% of residents were 65 years of age or older. For every 100 females there were 102.9 males, and for every 100 females age 18 and over there were 102.2 males age 18 and over.

The racial makeup of the county was 48.8% White, 42.4% Black or African American, 0.2% American Indian and Alaska Native, 0.9% Asian, 0.0% Native Hawaiian and Pacific Islander, 3.4% from some other race, and 4.3% from two or more races. Hispanic or Latino residents of any race comprised 5.0% of the population.

33.3% of residents lived in urban areas, while 66.7% lived in rural areas.

There were 7,662 households in the county, of which 24.1% had children under the age of 18 living with them and 33.8% had a female householder with no spouse or partner present. About 33.3% of all households were made up of individuals and 15.3% had someone living alone who was 65 years of age or older.

There were 9,087 housing units, of which 15.7% were vacant. Among occupied housing units, 63.7% were owner-occupied and 36.3% were renter-occupied. The homeowner vacancy rate was 2.6% and the rental vacancy rate was 7.2%.

=== 2000 census ===
As of the census of 2000, there were 19,720 people, 6,561 households, and 4,271 families residing in the county. The population density was 56 people per square mile (22 people/km^{2}). There were 7,527 housing units at an average density of 21 units per square mile (8.1 units/km^{2}). The racial makeup of the county was 62.17% White, 35.82% Black or African American, 0.18% Native American, 0.55% Asian, 0.10% Pacific Islander, 0.23% from other races, and 0.95% from two or more races. 0.94% of the population were Hispanic or Latino of any race.

There were 6,561 households, out of which 29.00% had children under the age of 18 living with them, 46.50% were married couples living together, 14.90% had a female householder with no husband present, and 34.90% were non-families. 28.90% of all households were made up of individuals, and 12.30% had someone living alone who was 65 years of age or older. The average household size was 2.43 and the average family size was 2.99.

In the county, the population was spread out, with 20.20% under the age of 18, 23.50% from 18 to 24, 22.50% from 25 to 44, 19.60% from 45 to 64, and 14.20% who were 65 years of age or older. The median age was 32 years. For every 100 females there were 95.70 males. For every 100 females age 18 and over, there were 93.20 males.

The median income for a household in the county was $31,301, and the median income for a family was $38,509. Males had a median income of $29,487 versus $21,659 for females. The per capita income for the county was $14,510.

=== Poverty ===
About 14.6 percent of families and 18.9 percent of the population were below the poverty line, including 24.4 percent of those under age 18 and 15.9 percent of those ages 65 and over. Persons below poverty in the year of 2007 were 20.3 percent compared to 9.9 percent of Virginia. Native Americans accounted for 71.8 percent in 2000. There is a relatively large number of children between the ages of 12 and 17. This age group accounts for 27 percent of the poverty.

Unemployment accounted for 10.3 percent in Prince Edward County compared to 7.2 in all of Virginia.

== Education ==
Prince Edward County Public Schools, the only school division in the county, operates the following schools, all located on the same multi-school campus in the Town of Farmville:

- Prince Edward County Elementary School
- Prince Edward County Middle School
- Prince Edward County High School

Also located within the multi-school campus is the Prince Edward County Career & Technical Education Center, offering a range of specialized courses, such as nursing, carpentry, agriculture and automotive technology.

The Fuqua School, member of the Virginia Association of Independent Schools, is the primary K-12 alternative to the public schools for Prince Edward County, having been founded as a segregation academy. It, like each of the county's public schools, is located in Farmville.

The private men's college Hampden-Sydney College is located in Prince Edward County, south of Farmville in the unincorporated community of Hampden Sydney, Virginia.

Longwood University, the third-oldest public university in Virginia, is located in Farmville.

== Politics ==
Prince Edward County is a competitive county, voting Republican from 1960 to 1992, voting Democratic in 1996, voting Republican in 2000, voting Democratic from 2004 to 2020, and voting Republican in 2024.

United States presidential election results for Prince Edward County, Virginia
Year	Republican		Democratic		Third party(ies)	
Year	No.	%	No.	%	No.	%
1912	72	10.24%	584	83.07%	47	6.69%
1916	108	13.92%	668	86.08%	0	0.00%
1920	189	19.59%	774	80.21%	2	0.21%
1924	140	16.22%	714	82.73%	9	1.04%
1928	494	41.41%	699	58.59%	0	0.00%
1932	196	16.37%	970	81.04%	31	2.59%
1936	253	17.94%	1,153	81.77%	4	0.28%
1940	313	21.81%	1,110	77.35%	12	0.84%
1944	425	28.49%	1,063	71.25%	4	0.27%
1948	459	26.72%	740	43.07%	519	30.21%
1952	1,359	59.34%	926	40.44%	5	0.22%
1956	932	31.43%	437	14.74%	1,596	53.83%
1960	1,721	53.55%	1,459	45.40%	34	1.06%
1964	2,545	62.62%	1,512	37.20%	7	0.17%
1968	1,857	39.80%	1,567	33.58%	1,242	26.62%
1972	3,199	65.96%	1,585	32.68%	66	1.36%
1976	2,734	50.36%	2,448	45.09%	247	4.55%
1980	2,774	49.55%	2,553	45.61%	271	4.84%
1984	3,454	56.11%	2,589	42.06%	113	1.84%
1988	3,147	55.02%	2,434	42.55%	139	2.43%
1992	2,858	44.78%	2,775	43.47%	750	11.75%
1996	2,530	44.56%	2,678	47.16%	470	8.28%
2000	3,214	50.51%	2,922	45.92%	227	3.57%
2004	3,571	48.81%	3,632	49.64%	113	1.54%
2008	4,174	44.46%	5,101	54.34%	113	1.20%
2012	3,952	42.78%	5,132	55.55%	155	1.68%
2016	4,101	44.85%	4,591	50.21%	451	4.93%
2020	4,434	46.31%	4,973	51.94%	167	1.74%
2024	4,782	50.55%	4,539	47.98%	139	1.47%

== Communities ==
=== Towns ===
- Farmville (northern part of town in Cumberland County)
- Pamplin City (mostly in Appomattox County)

=== Census-designated place ===
- Hampden Sydney

=== Unincorporated communities ===
- Green Bay
- Meherrin
- Prospect
- Rice
- Tuggle
- Israel Hill- Former community for free black people, now part of Farmville.

== See also ==
- National Register of Historic Places listings in Prince Edward County, Virginia
- Prince Edward County Public Schools Website

== Notable people ==
- J. B. Fuqua, businessman, philanthropist, chairman of The Fuqua Companies and Fuqua Enterprises. He was a supporter of the Fuqua School until his death in 2006, and the school adopted his surname in his honor in 1992.
- Joseph Eggleston Johnston, Confederate Army General
- Henry Watkins Allen, (1820-1866), Confederate Army officer, born in Prince Edward County.
- Blanche Kelso Bruce, the first black, full-term US Senator (1875 to 1881), Republican, born a slave in Prince Edward County.
- Charles S. Venable, Confederate Army officer, lawyer, served on the wartime staff of General Robert E. Lee. Born in Prince Edward County.
- Abraham Bedford Venable (1758-1811), a US Representative and Senator from Prince Edward County. He was a lawyer and a president of the Bank of Virginia. He died in a fire in Richmond in 1811.
- Reverend Vernon Johns, noted civil-rights leader
- James West (1931–present) is an inventor with over 250 patents.
- Lieutenant General Samuel V. Wilson, "General Sam," 5th Director of the Defense Intelligence Agency and 22nd President of Hampden–Sydney College; credited for helping to create Delta Force
