= Criminal-justice financial obligations in the United States =

Costs paid by convicted people incurred by their prosecution and incarceration

In the United States, criminal justice financial obligations (CJFOs), alternatively monetary sanctions or legal financial obligations, refers to costs paid by individuals as a result of their involvement in the criminal justice system. CJFOs consist of fines, property forfeiture, costs, fees, and victim restitution, and may also include payment for child support. They have their roots in European laws going back to the Middle Ages, and although they fell out of favor in the US in the early 19th century, regained popularity in the mid to late 20th century, to become the most common form of punishment used by the criminal justice system across the country.

Statutes for the imposition of CJFOs exist in all 50 states. The United States Supreme Court has generally held the measure to be constitutional, ruling that debtors may be imprisoned for willful non-payment. CJFOs may be imposed at all levels of government, although the amounts required or permitted may vary greatly according to jurisdiction. As of 2005, around 10 million people in the US collectively owed more than $50 billion in CJFOs.

Failure to repay CJFOs may result in a number of negative consequences, including accruing interest and penalties; imprisonment; extension of court ordered supervision; negative impacts on credit score; diminished access to housing, transportation and employment; ineligibility for public assistance; and ineligibility to vote, possess a firearm, be pardoned, or request deferred prosecution. CJFOs are normally not subject to discharge via bankruptcy.

== Types ==
Legally, CJFOs are similar to other sentences passed down by the court system. In their 2017 report, Martin and colleagues with the National Institute of Justice identified a minimum of five types of CJFOs:

- Fines and forfeiture of property – These are considered a form of punishment. In February 2019, the Supreme Court ruled that civil asset forfeiture may constitute excess fines and therefore be unconstitutional, even when imposed by states.
- Costs and fees – These may include court costs, fees for supervision, payments for legal representation. They are imposed to help reimburse the state for costs incurred.
- Restitution – Victims may be awarded payments as a way to compensate them for losses, either through direct payments for individuals or through payments into a general fund. These may cover the cost of things such as lost wages, medical costs, or property damage.

These may be instituted through the policies of multiple levels of governments, including local, provincial and national levels. The Council of State Governments includes in their definition unpaid child support, observing that in a study of one state, those released from prison on average owed more than $20,000 in child support alone.

Those upon whom CJFOs are imposed are referred to as legal debtors or billable inmates.

In the US, these are typically assessed in addition to other forms of punishment, such as incarceration. However, outside the US it is more common for them to be used as a replacement for other types of punishment, rather than in addition to them. For example, in Germany, 82% of criminal cases result in fines, while only 5% result in imprisonment. However, Germany, like much of Western Europe utilizes a system of day fines, rather than the fixed system of CJFOs utilized in the US. (Note: As Kantorowicz-Reznichenko explains, the day-fine system is based on a proportion of a person's daily income, times the number of days the fine is to be paid, according to the offense. "Consequently, although the nominal amount paid differs across offenders who have committed the same crime, the relative burden of the punishment is the same.")

== History ==
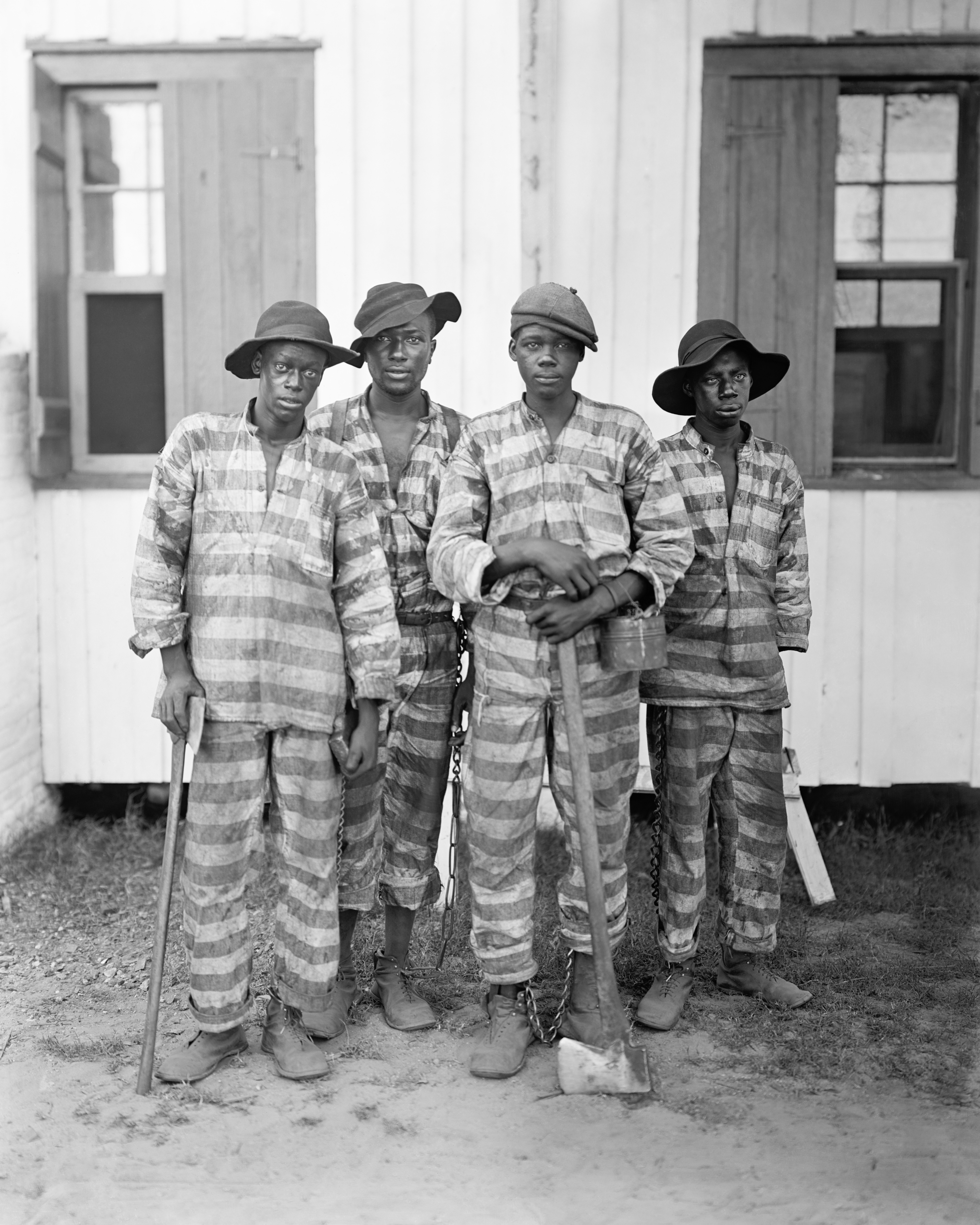
Convicts leased to harvest timber c. 1915, in Florida

The use of some form of criminal monetary sanction can be traced back as the primary form of criminal punishment in Europe over centuries, beginning in the Middle Ages. This included the practice of incarcerating those unable to pay their debts, including entire institutions dedicated solely to the imprisonment of debtors. This practice may have played a significant role in early emigration to the US, as debtors comprised almost two thirds of Europeans in the Thirteen Colonies.

These practices were largely adopted as part of the US criminal code as it was written throughout the 19th century following the European model. However, following the Panic of 1792, public sentiment regarding the treatment of debtors began to change, and, starting with New York, Maine and Tennessee in 1831, all states eventually abolished the practice of imprisonment for those unable to pay their debts, while still permitting the practice for those deemed "absconding debtors".

For decades in the US, CJFOs were used as a kind of debt bondage and a tool for racial domination in the South. (Note: As Harris notes, citing work by David Oshinsky, "a free black man in Mississippi in the late 1800s was fined $5.00 for being a 'tramp' and assessed other costs totaling $9.95.") These formed the basis of the convict lease system, which lasted until the 1940s. "Charged with fees and fines several times their annual earnings, many southern prisoners were leased by justice officials to corporations who paid their fees in exchange for inmates’ labor in coal and steel mines and on railroads, quarries, and farm plantations," which in turn helped to fund the judiciary and law enforcement.

During the first half of the 20th century, CJFO tended to be used less often. However, from the 1960s and 1970s their use proliferated. This was in part due to the exponential increase of people in the criminal justice system's jails, courts, prisons, and probation and parole departments. To avoid the associated increase in costs to taxpayers, legislators instead shifted part of that burden to those within the system by imposing new fees, fines, and surcharges, as well as enacting proactive strategies to collect those debts.

=== Legal precedent ===
While courts tended to uphold legal protections against debts related to civil matters, (Note: As in the case of State v. Barklind, where the Washington Supreme Court found that civil rules were "merely a declaration of an amount owing and ... not an order to pay.") these protections were not extended for debt related to criminal proceedings, as these were seen as a direct violation of a court order. Throughout this era, multiple US court cases addressed the issue of CJFOs, and the financial status of the accused or convicted, especially as it related to incarceration:

- Williams v. Illinois (1970) – The Supreme Court ruled that states may not imprison someone beyond the maximum statutory limit based on indigence and inability to pay a fine, since doing so would be to "accomplish indirectly ... that which cannot be done directly".
- Tate v. Short (1971) – The Supreme Court ruled that states could not automatically convert a fine into a sentence of incarceration based on indigence, and could only incarcerate for willful failure to pay on the part of those who had the means to do so.
- Fuller v. Oregon (1974) – Although the Supreme Court ruled 11 years prior in Gideon v. Wainwright that jurisdictions were obligated to provide legal counsel to indigent criminal defendants, they clarified in their 1974 decision that it was permitted to charge fees for this service.
- Bearden v. Georgia (1983) – The Supreme Court ruled that individuals could only be imprisoned for failure to pay debts if their failure to pay was deemed "willful".

The result of these and other rulings is that courts can sentence individuals to incarceration for nonpayment of CJFOs, so long as they hold a hearing and make a determination that the failure to pay was willful, there was a lack of bona fide effort to do so, and alternative means of punishment are insufficient to meet the state's interest in justice.

=== Prevalence ===
CJFOs are "the most common form of punishment imposed by criminal justice systems" in the US. Over a 30 year period from 1982 to 2012, the number of individuals in the US who were incarcerated or under supervision rose from an estimated 2,712,500 to 9,100,000, and the proportion of those subject to related fines rose from 12% to 37%. In 2005, about 90 percent of people in US jails were charged fees for numerous programs and services such as medical care, telephone use, per diem payments, and work release programs. Once on probation or parole, over 85 percent must pay fines, court costs, restitution, and fees for supervision.

As a result of CJFOs, in 2005, about 10 million people in the US owed in excess of $50 billion because of their involvement with the criminal justice system. However, a fraction of this debt is actually collected. For example, in 2014, the US Federal Government was owed over $100 billion of criminal debt, and during that year, federal judges imposed almost $14 billion in new CJFOs, but the government only collects about $4 billion per year.

CJFOs are permitted by law in all 50 states; however, the amounts permitted may vary greatly. As of 2016, the maximum fines assessed for felony convictions ranged from $500 in Massachusetts to $500,000 in Alaska. Behind Alaska, the highest maximum fines permitted were $200,000 by New Jersey, and $100,000 by Colorado and New York. Many jurisdictions place the imposition of CJFOs under the discretion of judges, while others may enforce mandatory minimum impositions. For example, in the state of Washington, the criminal code routinely applies a $600 minimum penalty to anyone convicted of a felony charge.

== Effects ==
CJFOs tend to disproportionately affect people of lower socioeconomic status and minorities. Failure to pay CJFOs can lead to a number of negative consequences, including increased time spent under supervision, additional charges by private debt holders, barriers to expungement or sealing of criminal history records, and risk of incarceration for failure to comply. The outstanding debt may be subject to interest rates as high as 12% in Washington state or 15% in California. In Florida, collection fees may be assessed up to 40% of the total value of the amount owed, and in 1994, Arizona added a "felony surcharge" amounting to 83% of the original amount of debt imposed by courts. In some cases, interest rates may exceed the minimum required payments, leading to increases in overall indebtedness even for those who succeed in making regular payments. If the debt is effective throughout the duration of a prison sentence, inmates accumulate years of interest prior to their release, and may be unlikely to make substantive payments on this debt while working for the low wages paid to prisoners.

Selected penalties for driving with a suspended license
State	Fine	Fees	Surcharges	Added charges	Due at sentencing	Total paid (Note: $50 monthly, on-time payments)	Months paid
California	$300–$1,000	$4, incarceration costs	$60–200	12% interest, $946–$2,276	$1,310–$3,480	$1,310–$5,983	31–120
Missouri	$150–$500	$12, incarceration costs	$19.50–$44.50	$25	$206.50–$582.50	$206.50–$582.50	5–12
N. Carolina	$0–$200	$125.50	$35.50	4% interest	$188–$388	$214.52–$431.31	5–9
Washington	$0–$1,000	$200	$250	12% interest, $100 annual	$450–$1,450	$686.85–$2,222.88	14–45

According to analysis by Gleicher and Delong with the Center for Justice Research and Evaluation, "[t]his creates a cumulative disadvantage that further entrenches vulnerable people into a cycle of poverty and incarceration." Inability to comply with CJFOs may result in additional economic hardships, such as lower credit scores, difficulty securing employment, and inability obtaining housing and transportation, (Note: For example, in testimony to the Washington State Legislature, one former inmate of 14 years emerged from prison with $33,000 in debt, and was only eligible for an auto loan at a rate of 29% interest due to his credit score.) further leading to an inability to pay increased penalties incurred for failure to pay penalties. In this way, involvement in the criminal justice system becomes "both consequence and cause of poverty".

As Martin and colleagues observed, the "vast majority of formerly incarcerated people are poor or near poor" and individuals are rarely exempted from CJFOs for reason of indigence. Despite the ruling in Bearden v. Georgia, courts often interpret "willful" failure to pay in such a way that they require defendants, even those who may be homeless, "to go to great lengths to secure the means for payment, including seeking loans from friends, family members, and employers, or taking day-laborer jobs." In many cases, failure to pay CJFOs may disqualify the individual from receiving public assistance, and debts that are incurred through the justice system are not subject to discharge through bankruptcy. Until payment is complete, legal debtors may be ineligible to vote, possess a firearm, be pardoned, or request deferred prosecution.

The size of CJFOs has been found to be unrelated to the likelihood of rearrest or reincarceration, although higher amounts have been associated with likelihood of having probation revoked. Lower CJFOs are more likely to be repaid, repayment has been associated with a lower risk for rearrest, and repayment is more likely for misdemeanors than for felonies.

CJFOs may also create a "perverse incentive" for law enforcement agencies and lawmakers, to concentrate on the most lucrative areas of criminal justice, which helps to account for substantial portions of operating budgets, while diminishing the resources dedicated to areas of law enforcement that are not revenue generating.

In a 2024 PNAS study involving a randomized experiment where some criminal defendants found guilty of misdemeanors in Oklahoma County, Oklahoma were given debt relief for court-related fines and fees and other criminal defendants were not, found that the debt relief had no impact on future lawbreaking. The study found that those who received the debt relief were less likely to be re-arrested or re-incarcerated in the future whereas who did not receive the debt relief were more likely to be-arrested due to their inability to pay court-related debts.

== See also ==
- Civil penalty, a financial penalty imposed by a government agency as restitution for wrongdoing in the case of a civil rather than criminal offense
- Court costs, the cost associated with pursuing a legal case
- History of United States Prison Systems
- Race in the United States criminal justice system
