= Debtors' Prison Relief Act of 1792 =

- Long title: An Act for the relief of persons imprisoned for debt.
- Nicknames: Debtors' Relief Act of 1792
- Enacted by: the 2nd United States Congress
- Effective: May 5, 1792

Citations
- Public law: Pub. L. 2–29
- Statutes at Large: 1 Stat. 265, Chap. 29

Legislative history
- Signed into law by President George Washington on May 5, 1792

Debtors' Prison Relief Act of 1792 was a United States federal statute enacted into law by the first President of the United States George Washington on May 5, 1792. The Act of Congress established penal regulations and restrictions for persons jailed for property debt, tax evasion, and tax resistance. The indebtedness penalty was governed as a forbidding act for citizens indebted to colonial provinces. The public law granted a sunset provision limiting the term of the federal statute for the colonial domains.

== Clauses of the Act ==
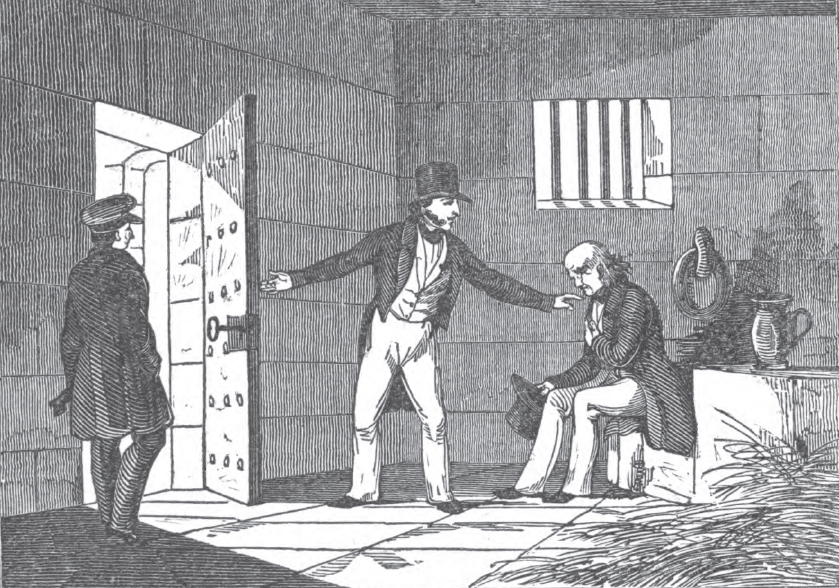
Richard Mentor Johnson exonerating a confined colonist from debtors’ prison

The Second United States Congress drafted public law 2-29 as four sections providing judicial conformity for colonial debtors who had insolvent financial bankrolls.

Chapter XXIX § 1: Gaol Privileges of Confinement and Yards

- Persons imprisoned from any court of the United States, for satisfaction of judgments in any civil actions shall be entitled to like privileges of the yards or limits of the respective gaols as persons confined in such gaols for debt on judgments rendered in the courts of the several states are entitled to, and under the like regulations and restrictions.

Chapter XXIX § 2: Court Proceedings for Debtors

- Any person imprisoned may have the oath or affirmation herein after expressed administered by any judge of the United States, or of the general or supreme court of law of the state in which the debtor is imprisoned, the creditor, his agent or attorney, if either live within one hundred miles of the place of imprisonment, or within the district in which the judgment was rendered, having had at least thirty days previous notice, by a citation served on him, issued by any such judge, to appear at the time therein mentioned, at the said gaol, if he see fit, to show cause why the said oath or affirmation should not be so administered; at which time and place, if no sufficient cause, in the opinion of the judge, be shown or doth from examination appear to the contrary, he may, at the request of the debtor, proceed to administer to him the following oath or affirmation, as the case may be, viz:

Poor Debtors' Oath

"You solemnly swear (or affirm) that you have not estate, real or personal, nor is any to your knowledge holden in trust for you to the amount or value of twenty dollars, nor sufficient to pay the debt for which you are imprisoned."

- Which oath or affirmation being administered, the judge shall certify the same under his hand, to the prison keeper, and shall fix a reasonable allowance for the debtor's support, not exceeding one dollar per week; and if the creditor shall thereafter any week fail to furnish the debtor with such weekly support, by paying or advancing the money to him, or to the prison keeper, for his use, the debtor shall be discharged from his imprisonment on such judgment, and shall not be liable to be imprisoned again for the said debt; but the judgment shall remain good and sufficient in law, and may be satisfied out of any estate which may then or at any time afterwards belong to the debtor.

Chapter XXIX § 3: Penalty for False Statement

- Any person shall falsely take the oath or affirmation aforesaid, such person shall be deemed guilty of perjury, and suffer the pains and penalties in that case provided.

Chapter XXIX § 4: Limitation of Act

- This act shall continue and be in force, for the space of one year from the passing thereof, and from thence to the end of the next session of Congress, and no longer.

== Abolishment of Debtors' Imprisonment ==
In 1839, the 25th United States Congress passed legislation seeking to prohibit confinement for public defaulters. The federal debt relief law was enacted into law by the 8th President of the United States Martin Van Buren on February 28, 1839.

The United States statute was authored with the stated conditions of the public law:

That no person shall be imprisoned for debt in any State, on process issuing out of a court of the United States, where by the laws of such State, imprisonment for debt has been abolished; and where by the laws of a State, imprisonment for debt shall be allowed, under certain conditions and restrictions, the same conditions and restrictions shall be applicable to the process issuing out of the courts of the United States; and the same proceedings shall be had therein, as are adopted in the courts of such State.

- 25th United States Congress, Public Law 25-35 ~ 5 Stat. 321 (February 28, 1839)

== Associated Debtors' Relief Statutes ==
Chronology of United States federal laws related to judicial relief of domestic debtors.

United States Statutes related to Debtors' Relief

| Date of Enactment | Public Law No. | U.S. Statute | Chapter No. | U.S. Presidential Administration |
|---|---|---|---|---|
| May 30, 1794 | Pub. L. 3–34 | 1 Stat. 370 | Chapter 34 | George Washington |
| May 28, 1796 | Pub. L. 4–38 | 1 Stat. 482 | Chapter 38 | George Washington |
| June 6, 1798 | Pub. L. 5–49 | 1 Stat. 561 | Chapter 49 | John Adams |
| June 6, 1798 | Pub. L. 5–50 | 1 Stat. 562 | Chapter 50 | John Adams |
| January 6, 1800 | Pub. L. 6–4 | 2 Stat. 4 | Chapter 4 | John Adams |
| March 3, 1817 | Pub. L. 14–114 | 3 Stat. 399 | Chapter 114 | James Madison |
| January 7, 1824 | Pub. L. 18–3 | 4 Stat. 1 | Chapter 3 | James Monroe |
| April 22, 1824 | Pub. L. 18–39 | 4 Stat. 19 | Chapter 39 | James Monroe |
| May 18, 1824 | Pub. L. 18–88 | 4 Stat. 24 | Chapter 88 | James Monroe |
| May 26, 1824 | Pub. L. 18–176 | 4 Stat. 60 | Chapter 176 | James Monroe |
| March 2, 1831 | Pub. L. 21–62 | 4 Stat. 467 | Chapter 62 | Andrew Jackson |
| July 14, 1832 | Pub. L. 22–230 | 4 Stat. 595 | Chapter 230 | Andrew Jackson |
| March 2, 1837 | Pub. L. 24–23 | 5 Stat. 154 | Chapter 23 | Andrew Jackson |
| February 28, 1839 | Pub. L. 25–35 | 5 Stat. 321 | Chapter 35 | Martin Van Buren |
| May 27, 1840 | Pub. L. 26–26 | 5 Stat. 381 | Chapter 26 | Martin Van Buren |
| January 14, 1841 | Pub. L. 26–2 | 5 Stat. 410 | Chapter 2 | Martin Van Buren |
| January 28, 1843 | Pub. L. 27–20 | 5 Stat. 597 | Chapter 20 | John Tyler |
| March 2, 1867 | Pub. L. 39–180 | 14 Stat. 543 | Chapter 180 | Andrew Johnson |

== See also ==
| Article Six of the United States Constitution | Panic of 1792 |
| Bankruptcy Act of 1800 | Panic of 1796–97 |
| Copper Panic of 1789 | Panic of 1819 |
| Georgia Experiment | Panic of 1837 |
| History of United States prison systems | Sainte-Pélagie Prison |
| Little Dorrit (1855–1857) | Silas M. Stilwell |
| Marshalsea | Sponging-house |

18th Century Debtors' Prisons

| Boston Gaol (Massachusetts) | Debtors' Prison (Tappahannock, Virginia) |
| Bridewell (New York City jail) | Debtors' Prison (Worsham, Virginia) |
| Debtors' Prison (Accomac, Virginia) | Walnut Street Prison |

Notable Colonists and Debt Dilemmas

| William Duer | John Pintard |
| Henry Lee III | Daniel Shays |
| Robert Morris | James Swan |
| James Oglethorpe | James Wilson |

== Pictorials of Debtor's Gaol ==
18th & 19th Century New York Debtors' Gaol

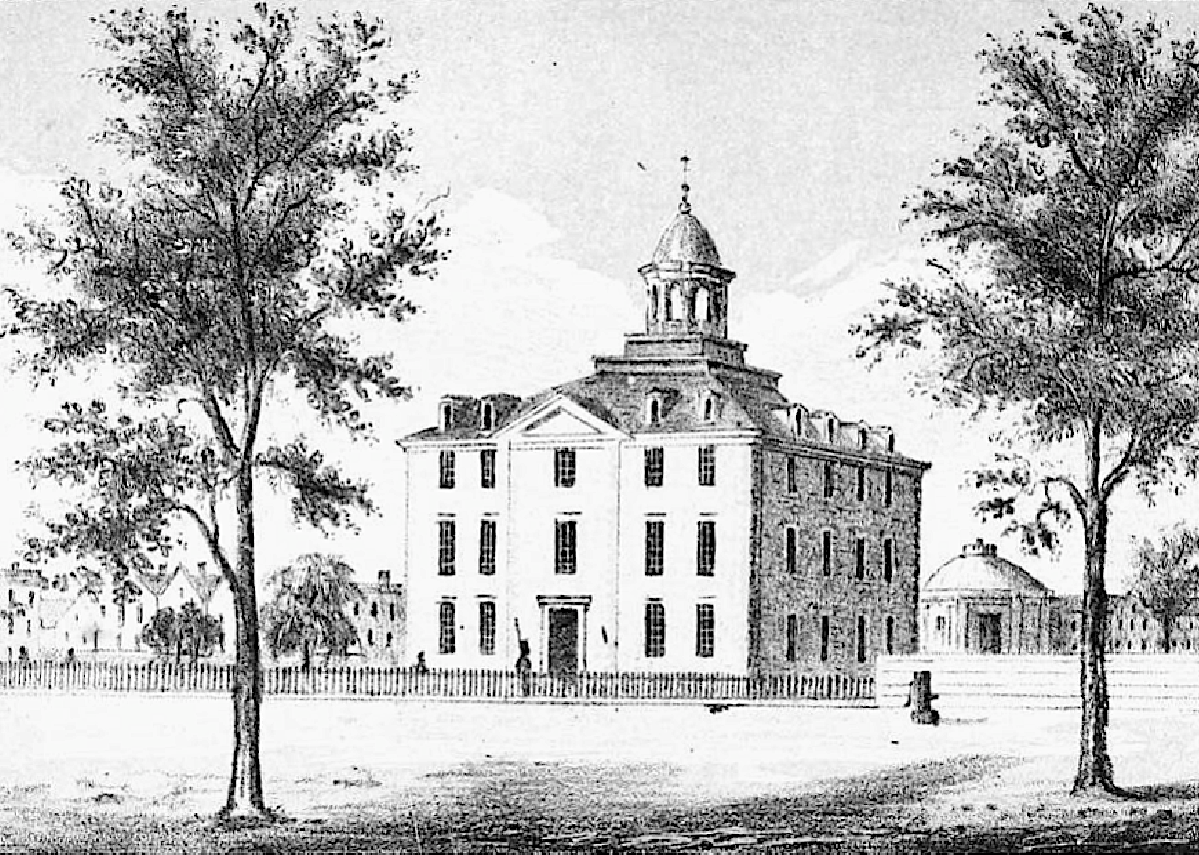
Lower Manhattan gaol erected in City Hall Park predated to American Revolution (ca. 1847)

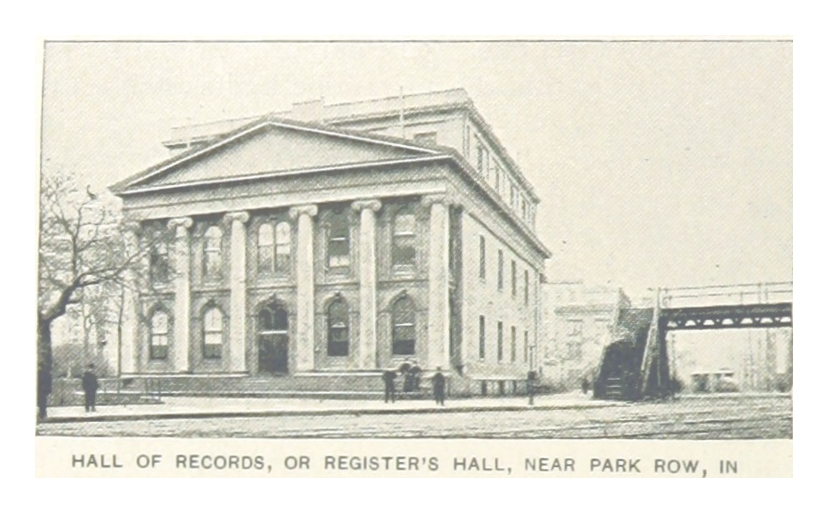
Old Debtors' Prison or New Gaol known as Hall of Records in 1830 at Civic Center, Manhattan (ca. 1893)

== Reading Bibliography ==
- Dornford, Josiah (1786). "Seven letters to the Lords and Commons of Great Britain, Upon the Impolicy, Inhumanity, and Injustice of our Present Mode of Arresting the Bodies of Debtors". Internet Archive. London, Great Britain: J. Andrews. OCLC 926275958.
- Turnbull, Robert J. (1797). "A Visit to the Philadelphia Prison". HathiTrust Digital Library. James Phillips & Sons. pp. 4, 20, 46–47, 58, 92.
- Neild, James (1802). "An Account of the Rise, Progress, and Present State, of the Society for the Discharge and Relief of Persons Imprisoned for Small Debts: Throughout England and Wales". HathiTrust Digital Library. Nichols and Son. OCLC 23027257.
- "Bill to Amend Act for Relief and Maintenance of Insolvent Debtors Detained in Prison in Ireland". Internet Archive. Her Majesty's Stationery Office (HMSO). April 11, 1810.
- Stilwell, Silas Moore (April 26, 1831). "The Stilwell Act of 1831" [An Act to abolish imprisonment for debt, punish fraudulent debtors passed April 26, 1831]. U.S. Library of Congress. Albany, New York: Elliott and Palmer. LCCN 92838635.
- Stilwell, Silas Moore (March 7, 1832). "Report of the Select Committee of the Assembly, on the Expediency of a Total Abolition of Capital Punishment in the state of New York". U.S. Library of Congress. Albany, New York: Packard, Hoffman & White. LCCN 92838634.
- Gibbon, John H. (March 15, 1833). "Report on the Debtors' Apartment of the Arch Street Prison, in the City of Philadelphia". Internet Archive. Henry Welsh.
- McAdam, David (1880). "The Act to Abolish Imprisonment for Debt: and to Punish Fraudulent Debtors, Commonly Called "The Stilwell Act," with Forms and References to The Judicial Decisions Thereunder". HathiTrust Digital Library. New York, N.Y.: Edward G. Ward. OCLC 5582508.
- Hall, Edward Hagaman (October 23, 1902). "The Old Martyrs' Prison, New York". HathiTrust Digital Library. American Scenic and Historic Preservation Society. pp. 6, 7, 9, 16.
- DePuy, LeRoy Beck (April 1951). "The Walnut Street Prison: Pennsylvania's First Penitentiary". Pennsylvania History, Quarterly Journal of the Pennsylvania Historical Association. XVIII (2). Pennsylvania Historical and Museum Commission: 6, 9, 13.
- Vause, Erika (2018). "In the Red and in the Black: Debt, Dishonor, and the Law in France between Revolutions". Google Books. University of Virginia Press. ISBN 978-0813941424. OCLC 1011613926.

== Historical Video Archive ==
- "Victorian Debtors' Prison". Internet Archive. Victorian Vault. 2019.
