= Tappahannock, Virginia =

- Town
- Town of Tappahannock
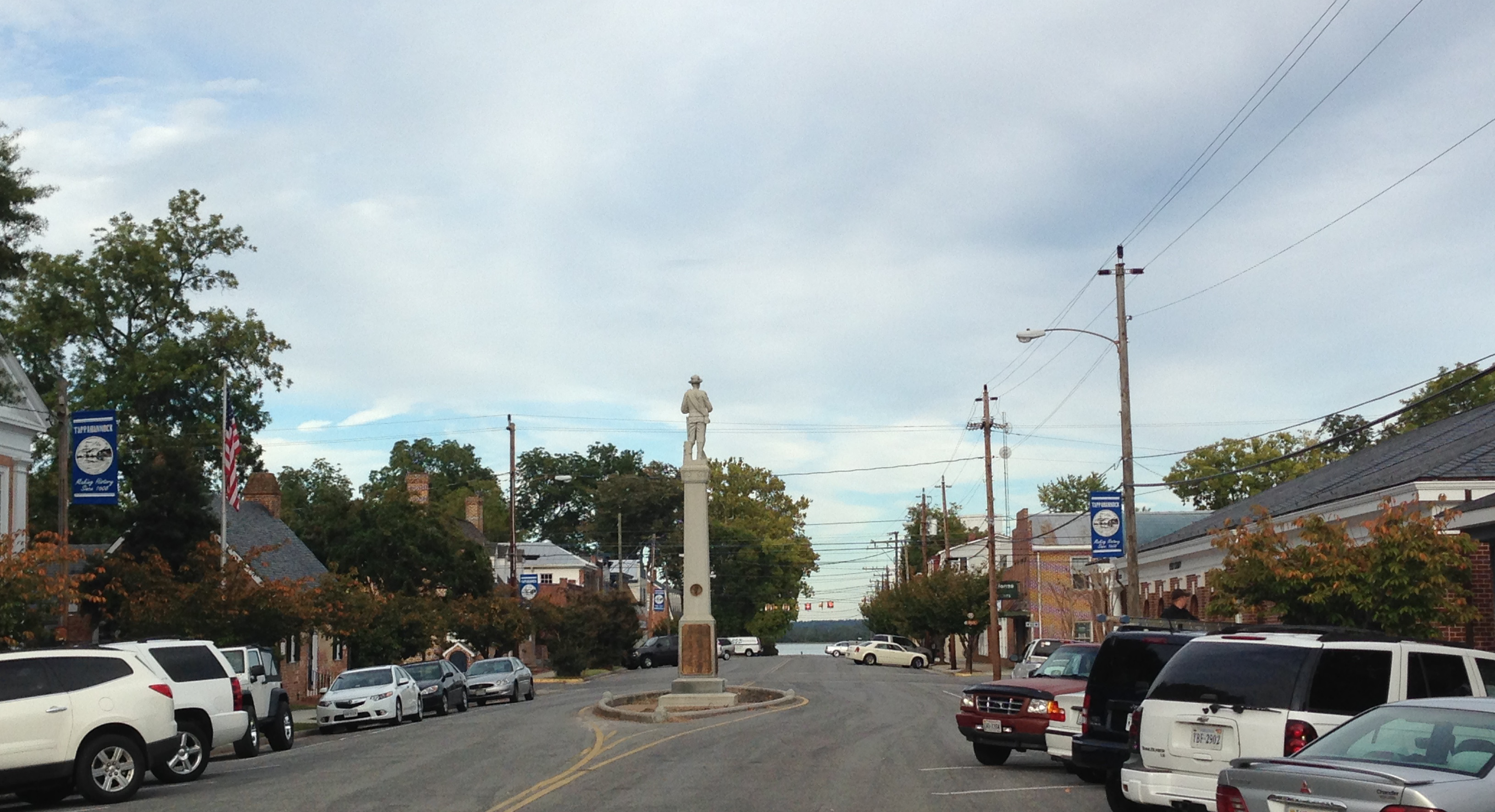
- The historic district of Tappahannock

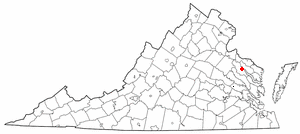
- Location in Virginia
- Coordinates: 37°55′20″N 76°51′47″W
- Country: United States
- State: Virginia
- County: Essex

Government
  - Mayor: Roy Gladding

Area
  - Total: 2.75 sq mi (7.11 km^{2})
  - Land: 2.67 sq mi (6.91 km^{2})
  - Water: 0.077 sq mi (0.20 km^{2})
- Elevation: 46 ft (14 m)

Population (2020)
  - Total: 2,193
  - Estimate (2019): 2,402
  - Density: 899.9/sq mi (347.44/km^{2})
- Time zone: UTC−5 (Eastern (EST))
  - Summer (DST): UTC−4 (EDT)
- ZIP Code: 22560
- Area code: 804
- FIPS code: 51-77568
- GNIS feature ID: 1498542
- Website: www.tappahannock-va.gov

Tappahannock is the oldest town in Essex County, Virginia, United States. As of the 2020 census, Tappahannock had a population of 2,193. Located on the Rappahannock River, Tappahannock is the county seat of Essex County. Its name comes from an Algonquian language word toppehannock, meaning "cold-water creek".

In 1608 English explorer John Smith landed in Tappahannock and fought with the local Rappahannock people. After defeating them, he later made peace.

== History ==
In the mid-1660s, Captain Richard Hobbs had rights to 800 acres south of Gilson's Creek at the Rappahannock River. In 1680, Virginia law required warehouses to be established in port towns, and that year surveyor George Morris created a survey showing Hobbs His Hole Harbour. "Hole" refers to where a ship could drop anchor in a deep part of the water, and thus it was Capt. Hobbs who parked his ship Elizabeth and Mary here in the vicinity of present-day Tappahannock. This area became known as Hobbs Hole.

The settlement was platted for 50 acres (20 ha), divided into half-acre squares. The port was established at Hobbs Hole and called New Plymouth, later changed back to the Native American name Tappahannock. As part of the Tobacco Inspection Act of 1730, public warehouses for inspection and exportation of tobacco, the colony's commodity crop, were established at Hobbs Hole. Ocean-going ships could reach this port.

During the War of 1812, the town was seized by British naval forces under the command of Captain Robert Barrie on December 2, 1814. The British left the town two days later, after burning down the courthouse and two jails.

The historic courthouse burned on August 30, 1965. Although many records were saved, some historic photographs were lost.

Senator Harry Byrd Jr. appeared at the ribbon cutting for the bridge across the Rappahannock River named for Thomas J. Downing on February 16, 1927.

The Tappahannock Historic District is listed on the National Register of Historic Places.

During the Tornado outbreak of February 23–24, 2016, the town was hit by an EF3 tornado on February 24, causing massive damage and injuring more than two dozen people.

On July 15, 2022, a fire destroyed many businesses along Prince Street as well as multiple homes in downtown Tappahannock, burning nearly half the town block. The cause of the fire, which started at the back of the Martin-Sale Furniture Company, remains unknown as of 2023. No deaths were reported aside from a pet cat belonging to one of the displaced residents.

In 2023, 1710 Tavern opened in a building originally constructed in 1710 that is considered the oldest tavern in the state. The historic structure retains many original features, including centuries-old floors, windows, ceilings, and fireplaces. Historically, the building served as an "ordinary"—a combination of a tavern and inn—where travelers could pay for food and lodging with money or trade tobacco. The structure predates the current road network in the area and functioned as a key stop along the main port.

During its restoration, efforts were made to blend historic authenticity with modern updates. The project incorporated elements such as bar floors made from 150-year-old wood salvaged from a former hardware store in Warsaw, Virginia; seating constructed from 125-year-old church pews from Newport, Virginia; and a bar counter fashioned from 300-year-old walnut sourced from Oakalona in Occupacia, Virginia.

In August 2024, the first phase of Tappahannock Central Park was completed, establishing a 2-acre recreational area that includes three pickleball courts, a tennis court, a playground, and a splash pad. The second phase, scheduled to begin in 2025, will expand the park's amenities with the addition of restrooms and entertainment areas.

== Geography ==
Tappahannock is located on the east side of Essex County at 37°55′20″N 76°51′47″W (37.922180, −76.863158), on the southwest bank of the Rappahannock River. The river is a wide, tidal estuary here.

According to the United States Census Bureau, the town 2.7 square miles (6.9 km^{2}), of which 2.6 square miles (6.7 km^{2}) is land and 0.077 square miles (0.2 km^{2}), or 2.84%, is water.

== Demographics ==
Historical population
Census	Pop.	Note	%±
1880	574		—
1890	452		−21.3%
1900	554		22.6%
1910	478		−13.7%
1920	422		−11.7%
1930	427		1.2%
1940	783		83.4%
1950	1,011		29.1%
1960	1,086		7.4%
1970	1,111		2.3%
1980	1,821		63.9%
1990	1,550		−14.9%
2000	2,068		33.4%
2010	2,375		14.8%
2020	2,193		−7.7%
U.S. Decennial Census

As of the census of 2000, there were 2,068 people, 857 households, and 495 families residing in the town. The population density was 793.6 people per square mile (305.9/km^{2}). There were 946 housing units at an average density of 363.0 per square mile (139.9/km^{2}). The racial makeup of the town was 54.60% White, 41.60% African American, 0.10% Native American, 2.50% Asian, 0.10% from other races, and 1.00% from two or more races. Hispanic or Latino of any race were 0.40% of the population.

There were 857 households, out of which 27.8% had children under the age of 18 living with them, 36.6% were married couples living together, 18.0% had a female householder with no husband present, and 42.2% were non-families. Of all households, 35.8% were made up of individuals, and 14.4% had someone living alone who was 65 years of age or older. The average household size was 2.23 and the average family size was 2.91.

In the town, the population was spread out, with 22.4% under the age of 18, 8.5% from 18 to 24, 27.0% from 25 to 44, 20.7% from 45 to 64, and 21.4% who were 65 years of age or older. The median age was 39 years. For every 100 females, there were 78.1 males. For every 100 females age 18 and over, there were 73.6 males.

The median income for a household in the town was $33,688, and the median income for a family was $41,579. Males had a median income of $28,409 versus $20,431 for females. The per capita income for the town was $17,862. About 10.6% of families and 14.5% of the population were below the poverty line, including 26.6% of those under age 18 and 6.7% of those age 65 or over.

== Transportation ==
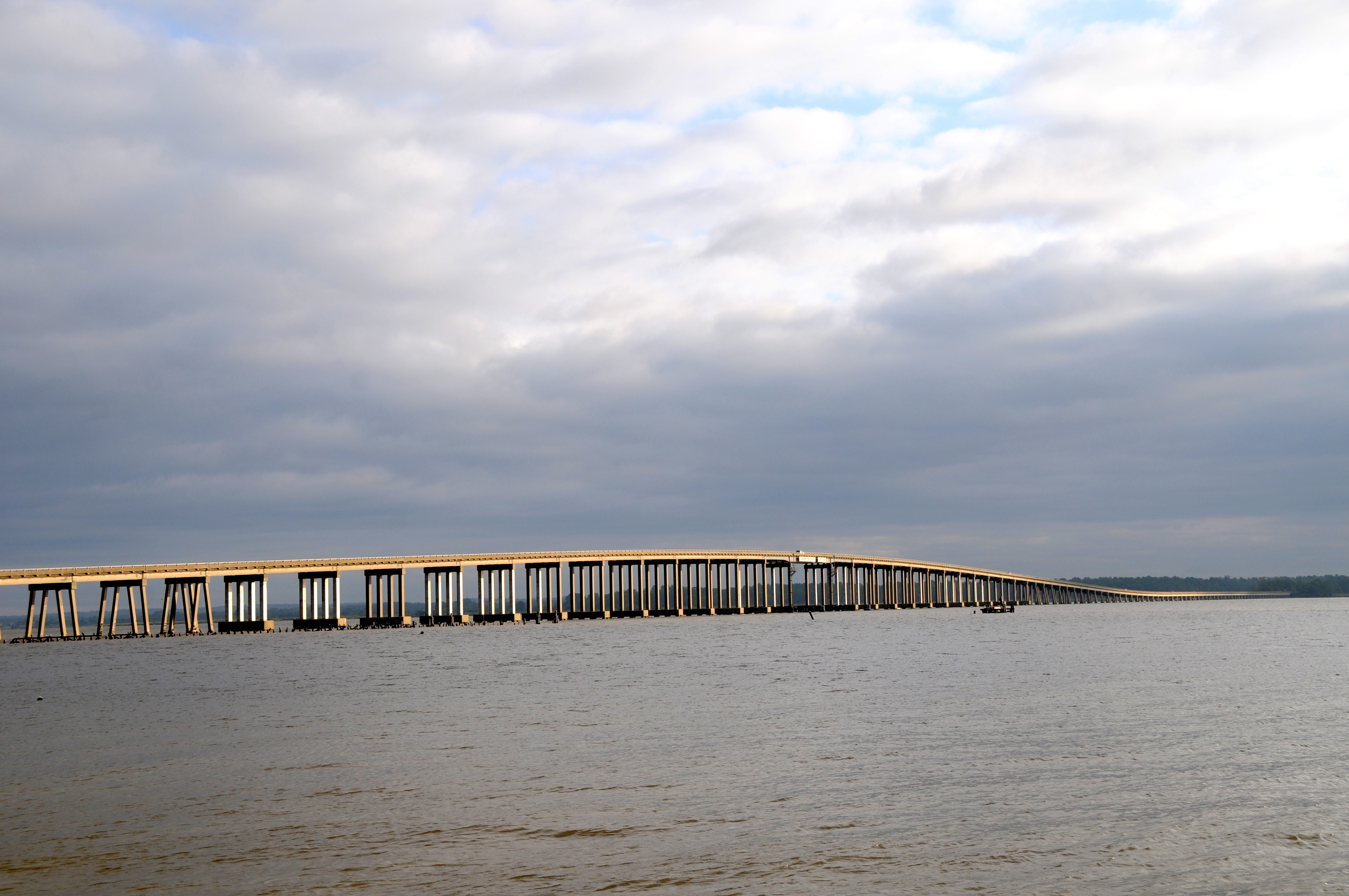
Thomas J. Downing Bridge (US 360) across the Rappahannock River

U.S. Routes 17 and 360 pass through the town. US 17 passes through the center of town as Church Lane, leading northwest 47 miles (76 km) to Fredericksburg and southeast 70 miles (110 km) to Newport News. US 360 runs through town with US 17 on Church Lane, but turns east on Queen Street and crosses the mile-wide Rappahannock River via the Thomas J. Downing Bridge, continuing east 39 miles (63 km) to its terminus in Reedville near the Chesapeake Bay. US 360 leads southwest from Tappahannock 45 miles (72 km) to Richmond, the state capital.

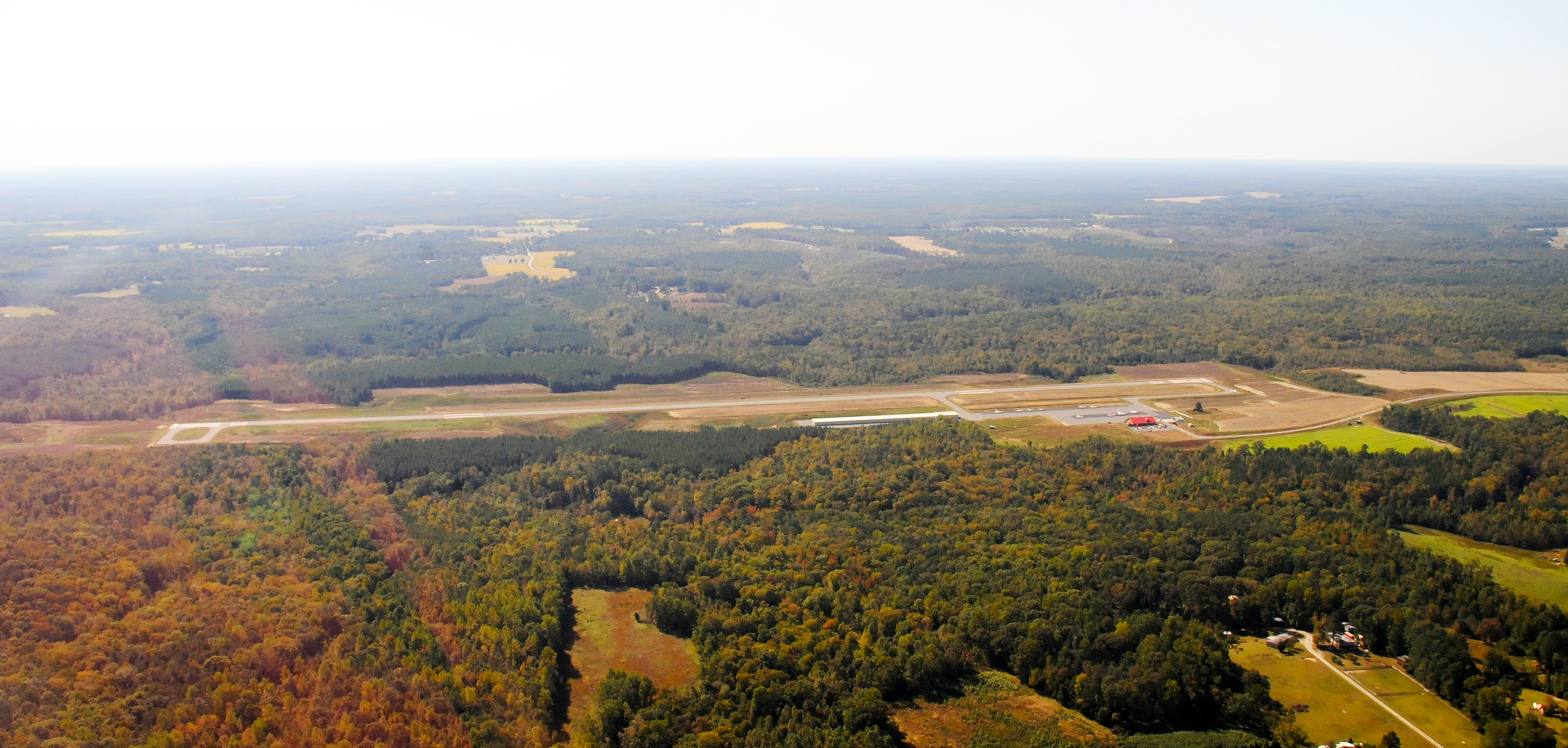
Tappahannock–Essex County Airport

The Tappahannock–Essex County Airport (KXSA) is located approximately 4 miles (6 km) south of Tappahannock and opened in 2007. Prior to the opening of the new airport, the old Tappahannock Municipal Airport was located inside town limits.

== Notable buildings ==
- Lowery's, a longtime seafood restaurant, operated from 1938 to March 2020, affected by the COVID-19 pandemic. In its place, a restaurant originally known as 528 Steak and Seafood opened and was later rebranded as 528 Italian American.
- June Parker Marina was a small working marina located on what was originally known as Hobbs His Hole Harbor on Brockenborough Gut. This was the original port of Tappahannock. The town was designed around this harbor to efficiently transport tobacco from Marsh Street. Wagons could make one single left turn onto Water Lane, which ends at Hobbs His Hole Harbor, now June Parker Marina. Thousands of pounds of English ballast stone lies on the bottom of the river there, discarded hundreds of years ago for the export cargo of Essex tobacco.
- The town is home to St. Margaret's School, a private boarding school.
- The historic Tappahannock Debtors' Prison is located here. It was constructed sometime before 1769. It is one of three such structures remaining in Virginia, along with those in Accomac and Worsham. The prison building is part of the Tappahannock Historic District, and as such was listed on the National Register of Historic Places in 1973. Also listed on the National Register of Historic Places is the historic DAW Theatre, located in the heart of Tappahannock's historic district. The theater opened in February 1939 and was named after its original owners—E.M. Doar, H.S. Atkinson, and R.B. Wallace. With a 500-seat Art Deco design, the DAW Theatre served as a cultural hub, hosting live variety shows, town meetings, and film screenings.

== Notable people ==
Notable people who reside or have resided in Tappahannock include:

- Chris Brown, Grammy Award–winning R&B pop star, actor, songwriter, dancer
- Lorenzo Bundy, Major League Baseball coach
- Bill Dennis, NASCAR driver, Winston Cup Rookie of the Year, 1970
- Darryl Hammond, Arena Football Hall of Fame member
- Audrey Long, actress, attended school in Tappahannock
- Catharine Flood McCall, 19th-century businesswoman and plantation owner
- William "Bill" Moore, blues musician
- Stacy Tutt, former New York Jets running back
