= Debtors' prison =

Prison for people unable to repay a debt

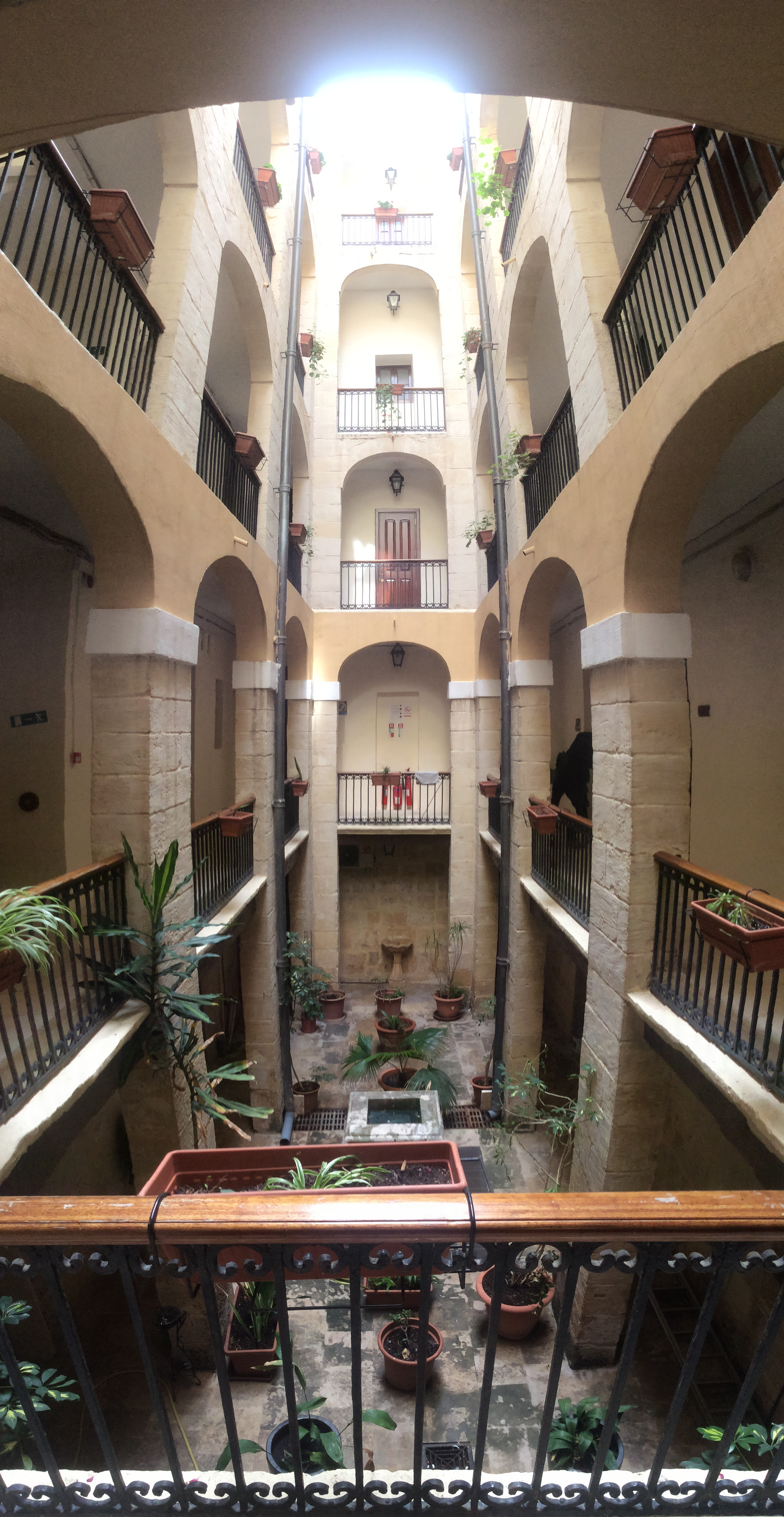
The 18th-century debtors' prison at the Castellania in Valletta, now the offices of the Health Ministry in Malta

A debtors' prison is a prison for people who are unable to pay debt. Until the mid-19th century, debtors' prisons (usually similar in form to locked workhouses) were a common way to deal with unpaid debt in Western Europe. Destitute people who were unable to pay a court-ordered judgment would be incarcerated in these prisons until they had worked off their debt via labour or secured outside funds to pay the balance. The product of their labour went towards both the costs of their incarceration and their accrued debt. Increasing access and lenience throughout the history of bankruptcy law have made prison terms for unaggravated indigence obsolete over most of the world.

Since the late 20th century, the term debtors' prison has also sometimes been applied by critics to criminal justice systems in which a court can sentence someone to prison over willfully unpaid criminal fees, usually following the order of a judge. For example, in some jurisdictions within the United States, people can be held in contempt of court and jailed after willful non-payment of child support, garnishments, confiscations, fines, or back taxes. Additionally, though properly served civil duties over private debts in nations such as the United States will merely result in a default judgment being rendered in absentia if the defendant willfully declines to appear by law, a substantial number of indigent debtors are legally incarcerated for the crime of failing to appear at civil debt proceedings as ordered by a judge. In this case, the crime is not indigence, but disobeying the judge's order to appear before the court. Critics argue that the "willful" terminology is subject to individual mens rea determination by a judge, rather than statute, and that since this presents the potential for judges to incarcerate legitimately indigent individuals, it amounts to a de facto "debtors' prison" system.

In Canada, failure to pay a criminal fine in full by the due date results in "imprisonment in default" for a term calculated by dividing the debt (the fine plus the costs and charges of committing and conveying the defaulter to prison) by eight hours per day at the minimum wage. For civil debts in British Columbia, a debtor may be jailed in contempt of court for defaulting on a required payment, and time spent in prison does not offset the debt.

== History ==
=== Medieval Europe ===
During Europe's Middle Ages, debtors, both men and women, were locked up together in a single, large cell until their families paid their debt. Debt prisoners often died of diseases contracted from others interned in debtors' prison for many years. Some debt prisoners were released to become serfs or indentured servants (debt bondage) until they paid off their debt in labor.

=== Medieval Islamic Middle East ===
Imprisonment for debt was also practised in Islam. Debtors who refused to pay their debts could be detained for several months in order to exert pressure on them. If they proved insolvent, they were released before being placed under legal guardianship.

== By region ==
=== Council of Europe ===
Article 1 of Protocol 4 of the European Convention on Human Rights prohibits the imprisonment of people for breach of a contract. Turkey has signed but never ratified Protocol 4.

=== France ===
Debtor's prison, both for private and State debt, was common in Ancien Régime France. It was suppressed during the French Revolution (1793–1797), but later reinstated. The debtor's prison for civil debts was abolished in 1867.

France still allows for contrainte judiciaire, ordered by a judge, for persons unwilling to pay court-ordered fines as part of a judicial sentence. Older, underage and unsolvable persons are exempted from the contrainte. Though France has a rule that no definite proof is required to prove someone guilty of something but a set of proof, thus it’s only required that it’s likely someone is willfully not paying his fine rather than having to prove what exact money he does own (legally named revenues occultes), this can lead to someone insolvent being sentenced for being unable to pay his fine as soon as a small mismatch exists between the money being spent and the money on the tax return.

Its length is limited following the amount of the fine and aims to pressure the debtor to pay his fines, consequently the owed money stays owed to the State. After serving a contrainte, the debt or fine must still be paid.

=== Germany ===
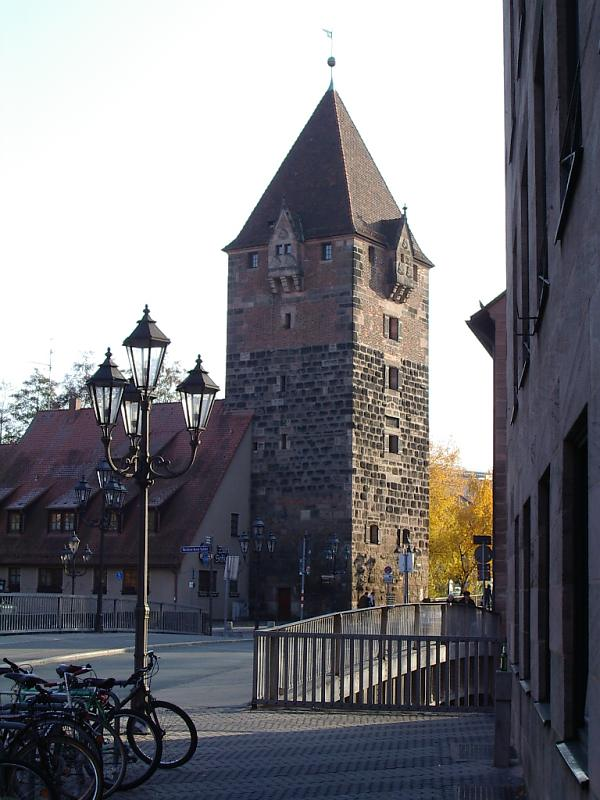
Schuldturm in Nuremberg

In the late Middle Ages, and at the beginning of the modern era, public law was codified in Germany. This served to standardize the coercive arrest (Pressionshaft), and got rid of the many arbitrary sanctions that were not universal. In some areas (like Nürnberg) the debtor could sell or redistribute their debt.

In most of the cities, the towers and city fortifications functioned as jails. For certain sanctions there were designated prisons, hence some towers being called debtors' prison (Schuldturm). The term Schuldturm, outside of the Saxon constitution, became the catchword for public law debtors' prison.

In the early modern era, the debtor's detainment or citizen's arrest remained valid in Germany. Sometimes it was used as a tool to compel payment, other times it was used to secure the arrest of an individual and ensure a trial against them in order to garnish wages, replevin or a form of trover. This practice was particularly disgraceful to a person's identity, but had different rules than criminal trials. It was more similar to the modern enforcement of sentences (Strafvollzug) e.g. the debtor would be able to work off their debt for a certain number of days, graduated by how much they owed.

The North German Confederation eliminated debtors' prisons on May 29, 1868.

=== Netherlands ===
In Dutch law gijzeling (lit.: take in as hostage) can be ordered by a judge when people refuse to (appear as) witness, or don't pay off their fines or debts. The imprisonment does not cancel the due amount and interest.

=== England and Wales ===
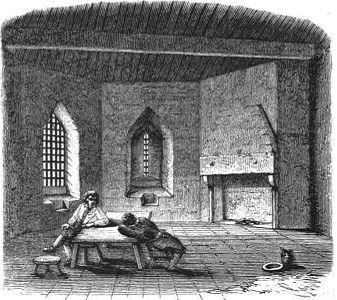
A mid-Victorian depiction of the debtors' prison at St Briavels Castle

In England during the 18th and 19th centuries, 10,000 people were imprisoned for debt each year. A prison term did not alleviate a person's debt, however; an inmate was typically required to repay the creditor in-full before being released. In England and Wales, debtors' prisons varied in the amount of freedom they allowed the debtor. With a little money, a debtor could pay for some freedoms; some prisons allowed inmates to conduct business and to receive visitors; others (including the Fleet and King's Bench Prisons) even allowed inmates to live a short distance outside the prison – a practice known as the 'Liberty of the Rules' – and the Fleet even tolerated clandestine 'Fleet Marriages'.

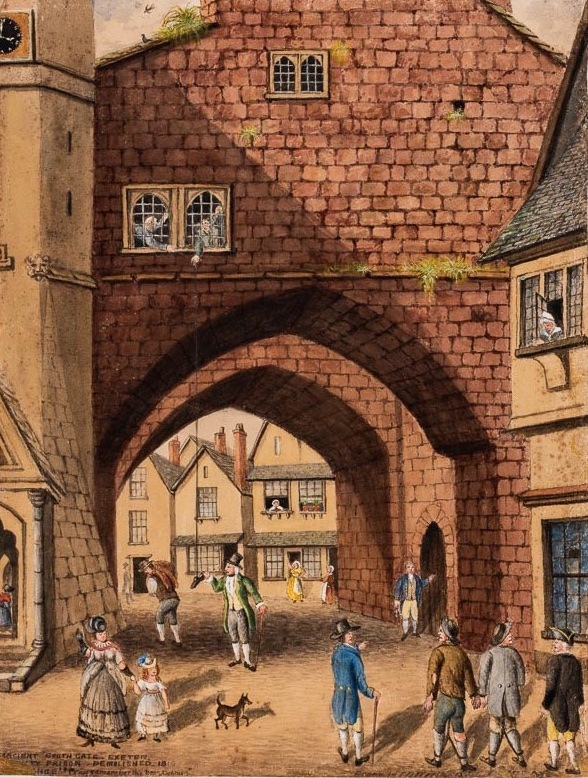
The Ancient South Gate and the Prison, Exeter by Thomas Burnett Worth circa 1880. The work depicts the South Gate in Exeter and the city prison which was demolished in 1819. A man under the archway, dressed in green coat and top hat, places something into a shoe which is suspended on string by two men from a window above. It alludes to the story about a room in the Keeper's house which came to be known as 'the shoe', according to the prison reformer James Neild who visited South Gate prison in 1806.

Life in these prisons, however, was far from pleasant, and the inmates were forced to pay for their keep. Samuel Byrom, son of the writer and poet John Byrom, was imprisoned for debt in the Fleet in 1725, and in 1729 he sent a petition to his old school friend, the Duke of Dorset, in which he raged against the injustices of the system. Some debtor prisoners were even less fortunate, being sent to prisons with a mixture of vicious criminals and petty criminals, and many more were confined to a single cell.

The father of the English author Charles Dickens was sent to one of these prisons (the Marshalsea), which were often described in Dickens's novels. He became an advocate for debt prison reform, and his novel Little Dorrit dealt directly with this issue.

The Debtors' Act 1869 (32 & 33 Vict. c. 62) limited the ability of the courts to sentence debtors to prison, but it did not entirely prohibit them from doing so. Debtors who had the means to pay their debt, but did not do so, could still be incarcerated for up to six weeks, as could those who defaulted on debts to the court. Initially, there was a significant reduction in the number of debtors imprisoned following the passage of the Debtors' Act 1869. By 1870, the total number of debtors imprisoned decreased by almost 2,000, dropping from 9,759 in 1869 to 6,605 in 1870. However, by 1905 that number had increased to 11,427.

Imprisonment of debtors was completely abolished by the Administration of Justice Act 1970, following the recommendations of the Payne Committee on the Enforcement of Judgment Debts, with the sole exceptions of debts owed to public authorities and maintenance orders. In 1969, the final full year of debtor imprisonment being legal, 2,364 debtors were imprisoned.

Some of London's debtors' prisons were the Coldbath Fields Prison, Fleet Prison, Giltspur Street Compter, King's Bench Prison, Marshalsea Prison, Poultry Compter, and Wood Street Counter. The most famous was the Clink prison, which had a debtor's entrance in Stoney Street. This prison gave rise to the British slang term for being incarcerated in any prison, hence "in the clink". Its location also gave rise to the term for being financially embarrassed, "stoney broke".

=== Scotland ===
Imprisonment for the non-payment of debt was competent at Scots common law, but the effect of imprisonment for such stood in marked contrast to the position in England even after the execution of the Treaty of Union in 1707. As Lord Dunedin observed in 1919, it was 'in direct contradistinction to the view of the law in England, that imprisonment was in no sense a satisfaction of the debt'; the purpose for imprisonment for debt was not to discharge the obligation to pay, but rather to act as a compulsitor to force the debtor into revealing any hidden assets. The Scots law allowing the imprisonment of debtors was grounded in large part by an Act of Sederunt of 23 November 1613, which introduced the process of 'horning' whereby the creditor would demand the payment of the debt by a certain date. If the debtor did not satisfy the payment of the debt within this stipulated time-period, the creditor could have the debtor 'put to the horn' by a messenger-at-arms. The execution of horning would have to be registered in the General Register of Hornings in Edinburgh. On registration, a warrant for the arrest of the debtor could then be issued. The formal process of 'horning' was not formally abolished until the passing of section 89 of the Debtors (Scotland) Act 1987 (c. 18), though in practice imprisonment for the non-payment of debts had ceased to be relevant in Scotland since the passing of section 4 of the Debtors (Scotland) Act 1880 (43 & 44 Vict. c. 34). Imprisonment remains competent in cases in which a court order, or order ad factum praestandum is breached by a debtor.

While imprisonment for debt was competent in Scots law, it was provided that debtors who were within the bounds of Holyrood Park (the whole of which was deemed a sanctuary) were exempt, and accordingly, till the abolition of imprisonment for debt, many debtors lived in lodgings within the bounds of the park. Such people were subject to the Bailie of the Park, who had power, in certain cases, to imprison them himself, in the Abbey Jail.

=== Greece ===
Ιmprisonment for debts, whether to the tax office or to a private bank, was still practiced until January 2008, when the law changed after imprisonment for unpaid taxes, as well as other debts to the government or to the social security office, was declared unconstitutional after having been practiced for 173 years; imprisonment was, however, still retained for debts to private banks. The situation regarding imprisonment (προσωποκράτηση (prosōpokrátēsē): custody) for debts to the government is still unclear, as courts continue to have this ability for criminal acts.

=== India ===
The Negotiable Instruments Act, 1881, as amended, contains provisions for criminal penalties, including imprisonment, if someone defaults on a debt or a payment obligation.

Section 28A of the Securities and Exchange Board of India Act, 1992 (As amended by the Securities Laws (Amendment) Act, 2014) contains provisions for penalties, including imprisonment, for failure to pay back investors or the authorities.

In India, courts have been known to jail financial defaulters as a way to coerce them to pay back their private creditors, or the state. For example, in the case of Subrata Roy, his bail was conditional on him paying back large sums to the investors or the regulators.

=== Malta ===
An eighteenth century debtors' prison is found within the Castellania in Valletta, Malta, now used as offices by the Ministry for Health. It remained in use as a prison until the nineteenth century. In line with the European Convention Act, no person is to be deprived of his liberty because of the incapability to fulfill a contractual obligation.

=== United Arab Emirates ===
Debtors in the United Arab Emirates, including Dubai, are imprisoned for failing to pay their debts. This is a common practice in the country. Banks are not sympathetic to the debtors once they are in prison, so many just choose to leave the country where they can negotiate for settlements later. The practice of fleeing UAE to avoid arrest because of debt defaults is considered a viable option to customers who are unable to meet their obligations.

=== United States ===
==== Early debtors' prisons (colonization–1850) ====
Many Colonial American jurisdictions established debtors' prisons using the same models used in Great Britain. James Wilson, a signatory to the Declaration of Independence, spent some time in a debtors' prison while still serving as an Associate Justice of the U.S. Supreme Court. Fellow signatory Robert Morris spent three years, from 1798 to 1801, in the Prune Street Debtors' Prison, Philadelphia Henry Lee III, better known as Henry "Light-Horse" Lee, a Revolutionary War general and father of Robert E. Lee, was imprisoned for debt between 1808 and 1809 where he made use of his time by writing "Memoirs of the War".

Debtors' prisons were prevalent throughout the United States until the mid-19th century. Economic hardships following the War of 1812 with Great Britain helped swell prison populations with simple debtors. This resulted in significant attention being given to plights of the poor and most dependent jailed under the widespread practice, possibly for the first time. Increasing disfavor over debtors' prisons along with the advent and early development of U.S. bankruptcy laws led states to begin restricting imprisonment for most civil debts. At that time growing use of the poorhouse and poor farm were also seen as institutional alternatives for debtors' prisons. The United States ostensibly eliminated the imprisonment of debtors under federal law in 1833 leaving the practice of debtors' prisons to states.

Changes to state debtors' prisons

Kentucky 1821 – save where fraud was shown or suspected
Ohio 1828
Maryland 1830 – for debts under $30
New Jersey 1830
Vermont 1830
Massachusetts 1831 – exempted women for any amount and men with debts under $10
New York 1832,
Connecticut 1837
Louisiana 1840
Missouri 1845
Alabama 1848
Virginia 1849

===== Historic preservation =====
- Accomac, Virginia – constructed 1782–1783, converted to a "gaol [jail] for debtors" in 1824, closed 1849
- Tappahannock, Virginia – constructed prior to 1769, converted to other uses 1849
- Worsham, Virginia – authorized 1786, constructed as a "gaol [jail] for debtors" 1787, closed sometime between 1820 and 1849

==== Modern debtors' prisons (1970–current) ====
While the United States no longer has brick and mortar debtors' prisons, or "jails for debtors" of private debts, the term "debtor's prison" in modern times sometimes refers to the practice of imprisoning indigent criminal defendants for matters related to either a fine or a fee imposed in criminal judgments. To what extent a debtor will actually be prosecuted varies from state to state. This modern use of the term debtors' prison arguably has its start with precedent rulings in 1970, 1971 and 1983 by the U.S. Supreme Court, and passage of the Bankruptcy Reform Act of 1978.

In 1970, the Court ruled in Williams v. Illinois that extending a maximum prison term because a person is too poor to pay fines or court costs violates the right to equal protection under the Fourteenth Amendment. During 1971 in Tate v. Short, the Court found it unconstitutional to impose a fine as a sentence and then automatically convert it into "a jail term solely because the defendant is indigent and cannot forthwith pay the fine in full." And in the 1983 ruling for Bearden v. Georgia, the Court ruled that the Fourteenth Amendment bars courts from revoking probation for a failure to pay a fine without first inquiring into a person's ability to pay and considering whether there are adequate alternatives to imprisonment.

A year-long study released in 2010 of fifteen states with the highest prison populations by the Brennan Center for Justice, found that all fifteen states sampled have jurisdictions that arrest people for failing to pay debt or appear at debt-related hearings. The study identified four causes that lead to debtors' prison type arrests for debts:

- State laws that attempt to make criminal justice debt a condition of probation, parole, or other correctional supervision with failure to pay resulting in arrest and reimprisonment.
- State laws that consider imprisonment as a penalty for failure to pay criminal justice debt. These actions are considered a civil contempt of court charge, thus technically not in violation of state constitutions that prohibit debtors' prisons, but for the same reason those incarcerated must be released immediately if they either pay or prove themselves unable to do so.
- Citizens choosing jail time under state programs where imprisonment is a way of paying down court imposed debt.
- States that regularly arrest citizens for criminal justice debt prior to appearing at debt-related hearings, leading in many cases to multi-day jail terms pending an ability to pay hearing.

In a 2018 article in The American Conservative, Michael Shindler argued that another factor responsible for debtors' prison type arrests is that "Whereas indigent defendants have a Sixth Amendment right to a court-appointed lawyer in criminal cases involving incarceration, indigent debtors in state and local courts have no one to defend them against the error and abuse that characterizes debt collection litigation." Similarly, Shindler wrote, regarding explicitly illegal debtors' prison type arrests ordered by local judges, "the reason these officials engage in this sort of excessive behavior is often due to ignorance."

In a 2019 report by the Lawyers' Committee for Civil Rights Under Law argues that debtors' prisons are likely to appear in states like Arkansas where many people live in poverty and are unable to pay fines and fees, where poor record-keeping exacerbates challenges faced by defendants, and where arrest warrants and drivers license suspensions make it even harder for people to pay off court-imposed debt.

==== Modern examples ====
In 2014, National Public Radio (NPR) reported that there were still cases of judges imprisoning people who have not paid court fees. The American Civil Liberties Union has been challenging such policies since 2009.

In September, 2015, in the town of Bowdon, Georgia, a sitting municipal judge, Richard A. Diment, was surreptitiously recorded threatening defendants with jail time for traffic violations if they did not provide immediate payment. The incidents caused the Bowdon Municipal Court to be closed for a month in order to implement changes in policy.

===== Modern U.S. by state =====
State	Modern	Debtors' Prison
Alabama		Imprisons debtors as a penalty for failure to pay criminal justice debt.; Allows imprisonment of debtors for child support debt, applies 12% interest; A city government in Alabama that imprisoned debtors for fees resulting from the use of a private probation company was halted by Circuit Court Order as being a modern debtors' prison. (2012)
Arizona		Imprisons debtors who are then typically required to submit financial documentation to the courts, to facilitate seizure of assets or wage garnishment.
Arkansas		Imprisons debtors who are then typically required to submit financial documentation to the courts, to facilitate seizure of assets or wage garnishment.
California	P.C. § 1205	Imprisons debtors who choose jail time under programs where imprisonment is a way of paying down court imposed debt.
Colorado		Imprisons debtors as a penalty for failure to pay criminal justice debt.
Florida		Allows imprisonment of debtors for child support debt as a contempt of court charge.
Georgia		Imprisons debtors as a penalty for failure to pay criminal justice debt.; Imprisons debtors for criminal justice debt without legal counsel
Indiana		Allows imprisonment of debtors for child support debt; Imprisons debtors who are then typically required to submit financial documentation to the courts, to facilitate seizure of assets or wage garnishment.
Maryland	H.B. 651	Allows imprisonment of debtors for child support debt; Stops payments and accrual of arrearages while a debtor is imprisoned and for a specified time after release for child support debt.
Michigan		Allows imprisonment of debtors for child support debt; Imprisons debtors as a penalty for failure to pay criminal justice debt.
Minnesota	Const art I § 12	Imprisons debtors who are then typically required to submit financial documentation to the courts, to facilitate seizure of assets or wage garnishment. Actually, debtors cannot be imprisoned merely for failing to pay their debts, but they can face sanctions by the court for failing to obey a court's order to show cause as to why they failed to reveal their financial situation to creditors.
Missouri	Rev § 543.270	Allows imprisonment of debtors for child support debt; Imprisons debtors who choose jail time under programs where imprisonment is a way of paying down court imposed debt.; Imprisons debtors for "failure to appear" as a contempt of court charge during discovery procedures to locate assets of the debtor.
Oklahoma	O.S. §,2.13	Allows imprisonment of debtors for child support debt; Imprisons debtors who are then typically required to submit financial documentation to the courts, to facilitate seizure of assets or wage garnishment.
Pennsylvania		Imprisons debtors for civil debt through an Order of Capias resulting from failure to appear for a deposition as part of discovery procedures to locate assets of the debtor.; Allows imprisonment of debtors for child support debt as a contempt of court charge.
South Carolina		Allows imprisonment of debtors for child support debt as a contempt of court charge without giving debtor right to defense counsel.
Tennessee		Allows imprisonment of debtors for child support debt as a contempt of court charge.
Texas	Government Code Ch 21 § 002(f)	Allows imprisonment of debtors for child support debt as a contempt of court charge during off-work hours.
Washington	Const art I § 17	Imprisons citizens who are then typically required to submit financial documentation to the courts, to facilitate seizure of assets or wage garnishment.; Allows imprisonment of debtors for child support debt as a contempt of court charge.; Proposed legislation requiring companies to provide proof a debtor has been notified about lawsuits against them before a judge could issue an arrest warrant for civil debts. (2011)

== International agreements ==
In 1963, members of the Council of Europe, an intergovernmental human rights organization based in Strasbourg, adopted the Protocol No. 4 to the Convention for the Protection of Human Rights and Fundamental Freedoms. Article 1 of the protocol states that "no one shall be deprived of his liberty merely on the ground of inability to fulfil a contractual obligation." Currently, 42 states have ratified the protocol.

In 1969 the American Convention on Human Rights, also known as the Pact of San José, was adopted by members of the Organization of American States. Article 7 (7) of the pact affirms "no one shall be detained for debt. This principle shall not limit the orders of a competent judicial authority issued for nonfulfillment of duties of support." Currently, 24 countries from the Western Hemisphere are parties to that treaty.

In 1976 Article 11 of the ICCPR – International Covenant on Civil and Political Rights – came into effect stating, "No one shall be imprisoned merely on the ground of inability to fulfill a contractual obligation."

These international agreements contradict the domestic laws of several ratifying states which allow for imprisonment.

== See also ==
- Alimony
- Bankruptcy
- Child support
- Debt bondage
- Debtors' Prison Dublin
- Josiah Dornford
- Medical debt
- Poor law
- Poorhouse
- Province of Georgia in the colonial United States, originally intended to be settled by debtors
- Shays' Rebellion
- Sponging-house
- Tax evasion
- Workhouse

== Literature ==
- Karl Gratzer: Default and Imprisonment for Debt in Sweden, in: Karl Gratzer, Dieter Stiefel (Eds.): History of Insolvency and Bankruptcy from an International Perspective, Huddinge 2008, S. 16ff.
