= W79 =

W79 may refer to:

- Cubitruncated cuboctahedron
- Minami-Wakkanai Station, in Hokkaido, Japan
- Tappahannock Municipal Airport, in Essex County, Virginia, United States
- W79 Artillery-Fired Atomic Projectile
