= XSA =

XSA may refer to:

- Tappahannock–Essex County Airport, the FAA LID code XSA
- Sabaic, the ISO 639-3 code xsa
- Xiangshan, Huaibei, the division code XSA
