= Court costs =

Costs of handling a legal case

Court costs (also called law costs in English procedure) are the costs of handling a case, which, depending on legal rules, may or may not include the costs of the various parties in a lawsuit in addition to the costs of the court itself. In the United States, "court costs" (such as filing fees, copying and postage) are differentiated from attorney's fees, which are the hourly rates paid to attorneys for their work in a case. Court costs can reach very high amounts, often far beyond the actual monetary worth of a case. Cases are known in which one party won the case, but lost more than the monetary worth in court costs. Court costs may be awarded to one or both parties in a lawsuit, or they may be waived.

In the United Kingdom, Australia and Canada, the losing side is usually ordered to pay the winning side's costs. This acts as a significant disincentive to bringing forward court cases. Usually, the winning party is not able to recover from the losing party the full amount of their own solicitor's (attorney's) costs, and has to pay the shortfall out of pocket. The loser pays principle does not generally apply under the United States legal system.

== United States ==
The loser pays principle does not apply under the United States legal system unless there is a specific statute awarding fees to the prevailing party. Alternatively, the contract between the parties may provide that the prevailing party is entitled to recover attorney's fees from the losing party. In cases in the federal court system, Title 28, section 1920, of the United States Code provides:

A judge or clerk of any court of the United States may tax as costs the following:

(1) Fees of the clerk and marshal; (2) Fees for printed or electronically recorded transcripts necessarily obtained for use in the case; (3) Fees and disbursements for printing and witnesses; (4) Fees for exemplification and the costs of making copies of any materials where the copies are necessarily obtained for use in the case; (5) Docket fees under section 1923 of this title; (6) Compensation of court appointed experts, compensation of interpreters, and salaries, fees, expenses, and costs of special interpretation services under section 1828 of this title.

A bill of costs shall be filed in the case and, upon allowance, included in the judgment or decree.

A 2022 study, which used a randomized controlled trial of court-related fee relief for misdemeanor defendants in an Oklahoma county, found that court fees neither caused nor deterred new crime, and did not provide meaningful financial benefit to the government.

=== Court costs by U.S. jurisdiction ===
Jurisdiction	Criminal Cases	Notes
U.S. Federal	Defendant never liable for court fees	Government liable for defendant attorney's fees in cases of bad faith prosecution
Alabama	Court fees payable on request of the judge if convicted	
Alaska	Court fees payable on conviction unless good cause shown	
Arizona	Court fees never available in a criminal case, even in cases of a bad faith argument	
Arkansas	Court costs assessed on conviction or guilty plea; $150 for misdemeanor or felony violation and $75 for local ordinance	
California		
Colorado	Court costs range from $5.00 for the most minor crimes to $4,500 for felony drug convictions and up to $3,000 for sex crimes	
Connecticut	$20 fee for those convicted of felony, $15 for misdemeanor	
Delaware	$10 fee for those convicted of any charge	
Florida	$200 fee for those convicted of felony, $50 for misdemeanor, with many additional costs depending on the crime	Florida is known to use a large number of fees, these can be collected from defendants with a 40% surcharge
Georgia	Georgia assesses a 10% additional fee if a defendant challenges a traffic violation and is found guilty	
Hawaii		
Idaho	Defendants are often required to pay fees	
Illinois	Offenders can be ordered to pay some court costs	Paying court fees can be a condition for parole
Jurisdiction	Criminal Cases	Notes

== See also ==
- Criminal justice financial obligations
