= Tappahannock Historic District =

Historic district in Virginia, United States

- U.S. National Register of Historic Places
- U.S. Historic district
- Virginia Landmarks Register
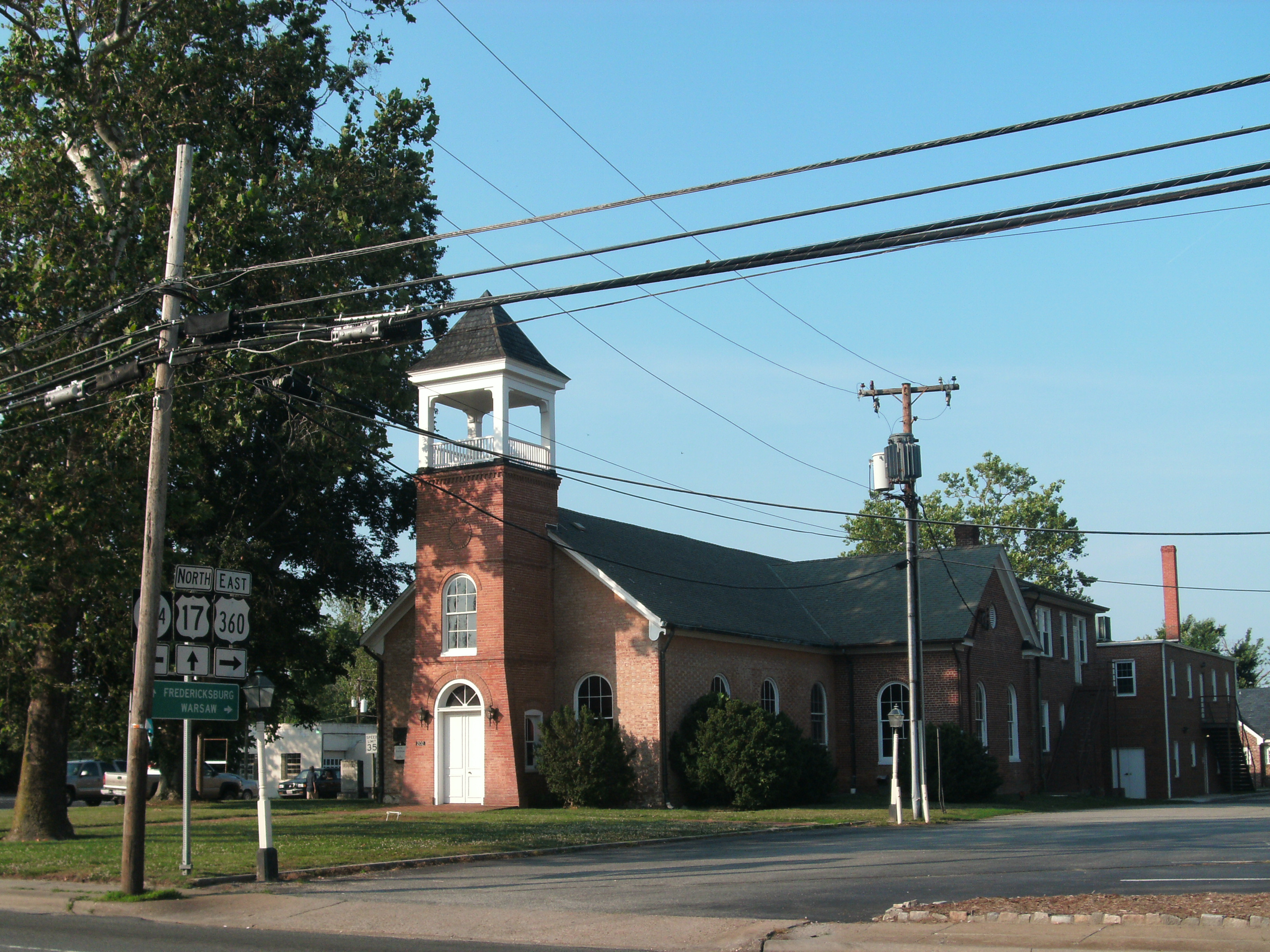
- Beale Memorial Baptist Church

- Location within Virginia Location within the United States
- Location: Roughly bounded by Queen St., Church Lane, Rappahannock River and the grounds of St. Margaret's School, Tappahannock, Virginia
- Coordinates: 37°55′39″N 76°51′31″W
- Area: 25 acres (10 ha)
- Architectural style: Greek Revival, Colonial, Gothic Revival
- NRHP reference No.: 73002009
- VLR No.: 310-0024

Significant dates
- Added to NRHP: April 2, 1973
- Designated VLR: August 15, 1972

Tappahannock Historic District is a national historic district located at Tappahannock, Essex County, Virginia. It encompasses 14 contributing buildings dating from the 18th through late-19th centuries. They are the Customs House (c. 1750), Scot's Arms Tavern, Five Cents and Dollar Store, Ritchie House, Beale Memorial Baptist Church (Early Essex County Court House; 1728, 1814), Old Clerk's Office (c. 1808), Essex County Court House (1848, 1926), Debtor's Prison (c. 1769), Henley House (c. 1757), Anderton House (c. 1750), Brockenbrough House, St. Margaret's Hall, Roane-Wright House (c. 1850), and St. John's Episcopal Church (1837-1849).

It was listed on the National Register of Historic Places in 1973.
