= Bearden v. Georgia =

- Supreme Court of the United States

Argued January 11, 1983 Decided May 24, 1983
- Full case name: Bearden v. Georgia
- Citations: 461 U.S. 660 (more) 103 S. Ct. 2064; 76 L. Ed. 2d 221; 1983 U.S. LEXIS 39

Case history
- Prior: Bearden v. State, 161 Ga. App. 640, 288 S.E.2d 662 (Ct. App. 1982); cert. granted, 458 U.S. 1105 (1982).

Holding
- A sentencing court cannot properly revoke a defendant's probation for failure to pay a fine and make restitution, absent evidence and findings that he was somehow responsible for the failure or that alternative forms of punishment were inadequate to meet the State's interest in punishment and deterrence, and hence the trial court erred in automatically revoking petitioner's probation and turning the fine into a prison sentence without making such a determination.

Court membership
- Chief Justice Warren E. Burger Associate Justices William J. Brennan Jr. · Byron White; Thurgood Marshall · Harry Blackmun; Lewis F. Powell Jr. · William Rehnquist; John P. Stevens · Sandra Day O'Connor

Case opinions
- Majority: O'Connor, joined by Brennan, Marshall, Blackmun, Stevens
- Concurrence: White (in judgment), joined by Burger, Powell, Rehnquist

Laws applied
- U.S. Const. amend. XIV

Bearden v. Georgia, 461 U.S. 660 (1983), was a landmark U.S. Supreme Court case holding that a local government can only imprison or jail someone for not paying a fine if it can be shown, by means of a hearing, that the person in question could have paid it but "willfully" chose not to do so.

== Background ==
Tunnel Hill, Georgia resident, Danny Bearden was convicted of robbery for breaking into a trailer as a young man. As a result, he was ordered to pay a $500 fine and $250 in restitution, which he was initially paying off until he lost his job and couldn't find another one. This left him unable to pay the rest of his fines and fees, for which Georgia sent him to prison. Bearden's case was handled by Jim Lohr, a court-appointed attorney who had graduated from law school only a few years earlier. Lohr spent hours researching in the library before the case.

== Ruling ==
On May 24, 1983, the Supreme Court ruled 5-4 that imprisoning Bearden violated his Fourteenth Amendment rights to "fundamental rights". In the Court's opinion, Sandra Day O'Connor, the Supreme Court's most junior Associate Justice at the time, wrote that it was "fundamentally unfair" for Georgia to have imprisoned Bearden. The ruling held that local governments "must inquire into the reasons for the failure to pay" when dealing with revocation cases for people who failed to pay a fine, and that only if the probationer "willfully refused to pay or failed to make sufficient bona fide efforts legally to acquire the resources to pay" can they be imprisoned or jailed. The ruling also held that courts must consider alternatives to imprisonment and determine that they are insufficient to "meet the state's interest in punishment and deterrence" before sending someone to prison for nonpayment of a fine.

== Impact ==
Although the Bearden ruling required that the defendant in a case regarding not paying court fines can only be imprisoned if they "willfully" chose not to pay them, the Court did not define what "willfully" meant in this context. This has frequently led to judges having to determine whether someone who did not pay a fine was too poor to do so or not. Some attorneys with many poor clients have said that the requirement in Bearden that judges consider a defendant's ability to pay is almost never enforced.

== See also ==
- Fuller v. Oregon
- Tate v. Short
- Williams v. Illinois
