= Tappahannock–Essex County Airport =

- IATA: none; ICAO: KXSA; FAA LID: XSA

Summary
- Airport type: Public
- Owner: Tappahannock Essex County Airport Authority
- Serves: Tappahannock, Virginia
- Location: Essex County, near Tappahannock, Virginia
- Elevation AMSL: 136 ft (41 m)
- Coordinates: 37°51′35″N 076°53′39″W
- Website: TappahannockEssexAirport.com
- Interactive map of Tappahannock–Essex County Airport

Runways
Direction	Length		Surface
Direction	ft	m	Surface
10/28	4,300	1,311	Asphalt
- Source: Federal Aviation Administration

Tappahannock–Essex County Airport (ICAO: KXSA, FAA LID: XSA) is a public-use airport located five nautical miles (9 km) south of the central business district of Tappahannock, a town in Essex County, Virginia, United States. It is owned by the Tappahannock Essex County Airport Authority.

Opened in 2007 and located near Route 360 at St. Paul's Crossroads, this airport replaced the former Tappahannock Municipal Airport (FAA LID: W79) which was located near the intersection of Route 17 & Airport Road.

Although most U.S. airports use the same three-letter location identifier for the FAA and IATA, Tappahannock–Essex County Airport is assigned XSA by the FAA but has no designation from the IATA.

== Facilities and aircraft ==
Tappahannock–Essex County Airport covers an area of 423 acres (171 ha) which contains one asphalt paved runway (10/28), equipped with a two-light PAPI on each side and runway end identifier lights, measuring 4,300 x 75 ft (1,311 x 23 m).

In 2014 there were 23 Aircraft based on the field, of which 19 were single engine, 3 multi engine and 1 helicopter. For a 12-Month period ending 31 December 2014 there were an average of 23 Operations per day, 50% of which were local general aviation, 23% air taxi, 18% military and 10% transient general aviation.

== History ==
Ground was broken for the airport in 2005. The flight strip was paid for by local tax payers and a federal grant, replacing Tappahannock Municipal Airport which was abandoned following the opening of Tappahannock–Essex County Airport.
