= Debtors' Prison (Tappahannock, Virginia) =

Historic former jail in Virginia, US

- U.S. Historic district – Contributing property
- Virginia Historic Landmark
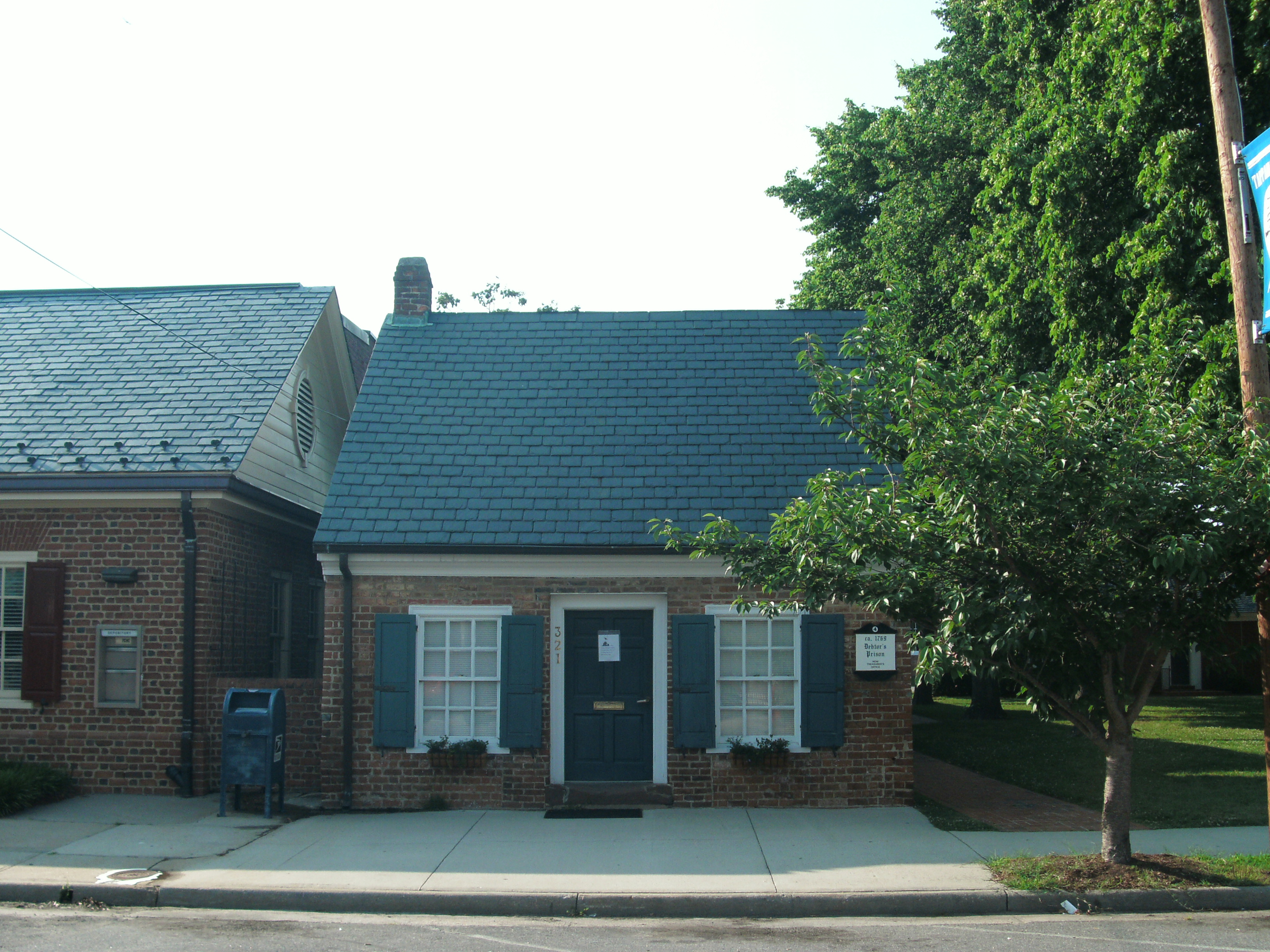
- Tappahannock Debtors' Prison

- Location within Virginia Location within the United States
- Location: 321 Prince St. Tappahannock, Virginia
- Coordinates: 37°55′20″N 76°51′47″W
- Built: before 1769
- Architectural style: Colonial
- Part of: Tappahannock Historic District (ID73002009)
- Added to NRHP: April 2, 1973

The Debtors' Prison in Tappahannock, Virginia, is a historic debtors' prison dating back to the 18th century. Constructed sometime before 1769, it is one of three such structures remaining in Virginia, along with those in Accomac and Worsham. In the early 19th century, the practice of imprisoning debtors was abolished, marking a significant shift in societal attitudes towards debt and punishment. By 1820, the former prison had undergone a transformation, being repurposed into a residential space. The prison building is a contributing structure to the Tappahannock Historic District, and as such was listed on the National Register of Historic Places in 1973.

== History ==
The exact date of construction for the old debtors' prison is not known, but a court order from 1769 shows it as being surrounded by "prison bounds", indicating that the structure had most likely already been built and was in use by that date. Its existence is noted in another court order, dating to 1809, that separated criminal and debtor prison populations into different facilities. A town plat drawn up in 1850 shows it at its present location, on the courthouse green, along with four other jails. Little else is known about its history, save that it was most likely converted to other uses when the state of Virginia abandoned the use of imprisonment as a punishment for debt in 1849. Unlike similar buildings elsewhere in Virginia, the jail is still owned by the county government, which currently uses it as the county treasurer's office.

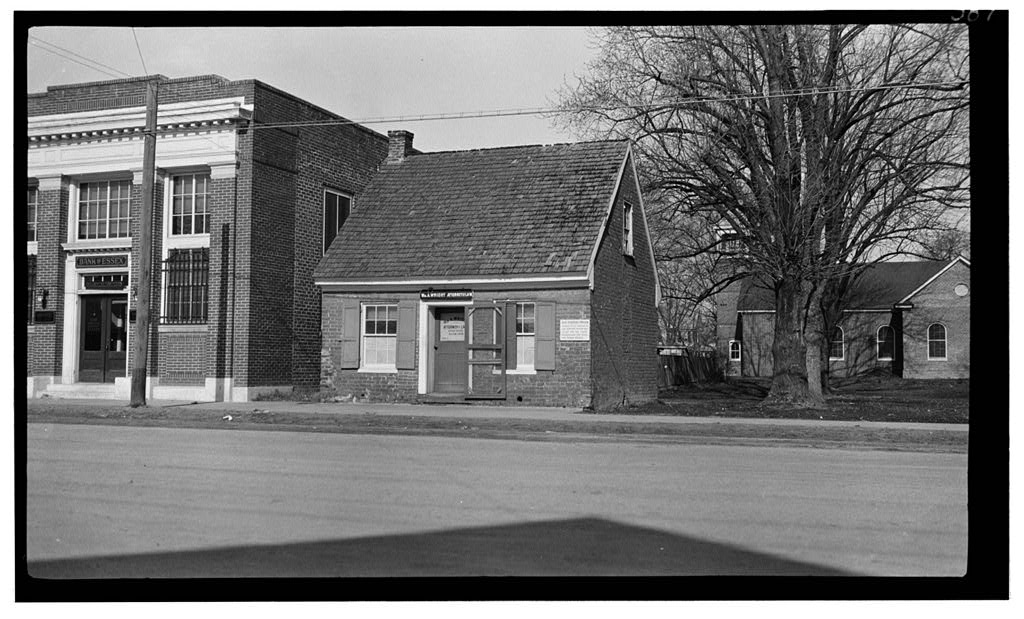
An earlier view of the prison structure

== Design ==
The prison building is simple in design, being made of Flemish bond brick and having three bays in front. The entry door is at the center of the front face of the structure, and has a well-worn sandstone sill at its foot. There is a more modern addition on the rear of the building. The prison's floor plan is almost square, and it is one-and-one-half stories tall.

== Significance ==
The Debtors' Prison is part of a compact block of historic structures, located in central Tappahannock and bounded by Church Lane, Queen's Street, Cross Street, and Prince Street, which together trace the town's political and maritime history. With the Old Clerk's Office, the Old Essex County Courthouse, and the New Essex County Courthouse, it forms the town's "most convincing case for architectural history". The four also serve to show the marked similarity of design often seen in county court facilities in the area.
