= Tappahannock Municipal Airport =

Tappahannock Municipal Airport (closed 2007)
- IATA: none; ICAO: none; FAA LID: W79

Summary
- Airport type: Public
- Owner: Town of Tappahannock
- Serves: Tappahannock, Virginia
- Elevation AMSL: 31 ft (9.4 m)
- Coordinates: 37°55′30″N 076°52′18″W
- Interactive map of Tappahannock Municipal Airport (closed 2007)

Runways
Direction	Length		Surface
Direction	ft	m	Surface
2/20	2,785	849	Asphalt

Statistics (2006)
- Aircraft operations: 6,990
- Source: Federal Aviation Administration

Tappahannock Municipal Airport (FAA LID: W79) was a town-owned public-use airport located one nautical mile (1.85 km) west of the central business district of Tappahannock, a town in Essex County, Virginia, United States. It was located south of the intersection of Route 17 & Airport Road.

The airport closed in 2007, following the opening of Tappahannock-Essex County Airport (FAA LID: XSA).

== History ==
The Tappahannock Flight Strip opened in 1944 and had a 4,000-foot (1,200 m) hard-surfaced runway. It was one of many flight strips built during World War II for emergency use by military aircraft. Sometime after the war it was converted to civilian use. By 1968, a state airport directory listed Tappahannock Municipal Airport as operated by the Town of Tappahannock and containing a shorter 2,800-foot paved runway.

== Facilities and aircraft ==
Tappahannock Municipal Airport covered an area of 75 acres (30 ha) and contained one asphalt paved runway (2/20) measuring 2,785 x 75 ft (849 x 23 m). For the 12-month period ending July 31, 2006, the airport had 6,990 aircraft operations, an average of 19 per day: 99% general aviation and 1% military.
