= Debtors' Prison (Worsham, Virginia) =

- U.S. National Register of Historic Places
- Virginia Historic Landmark
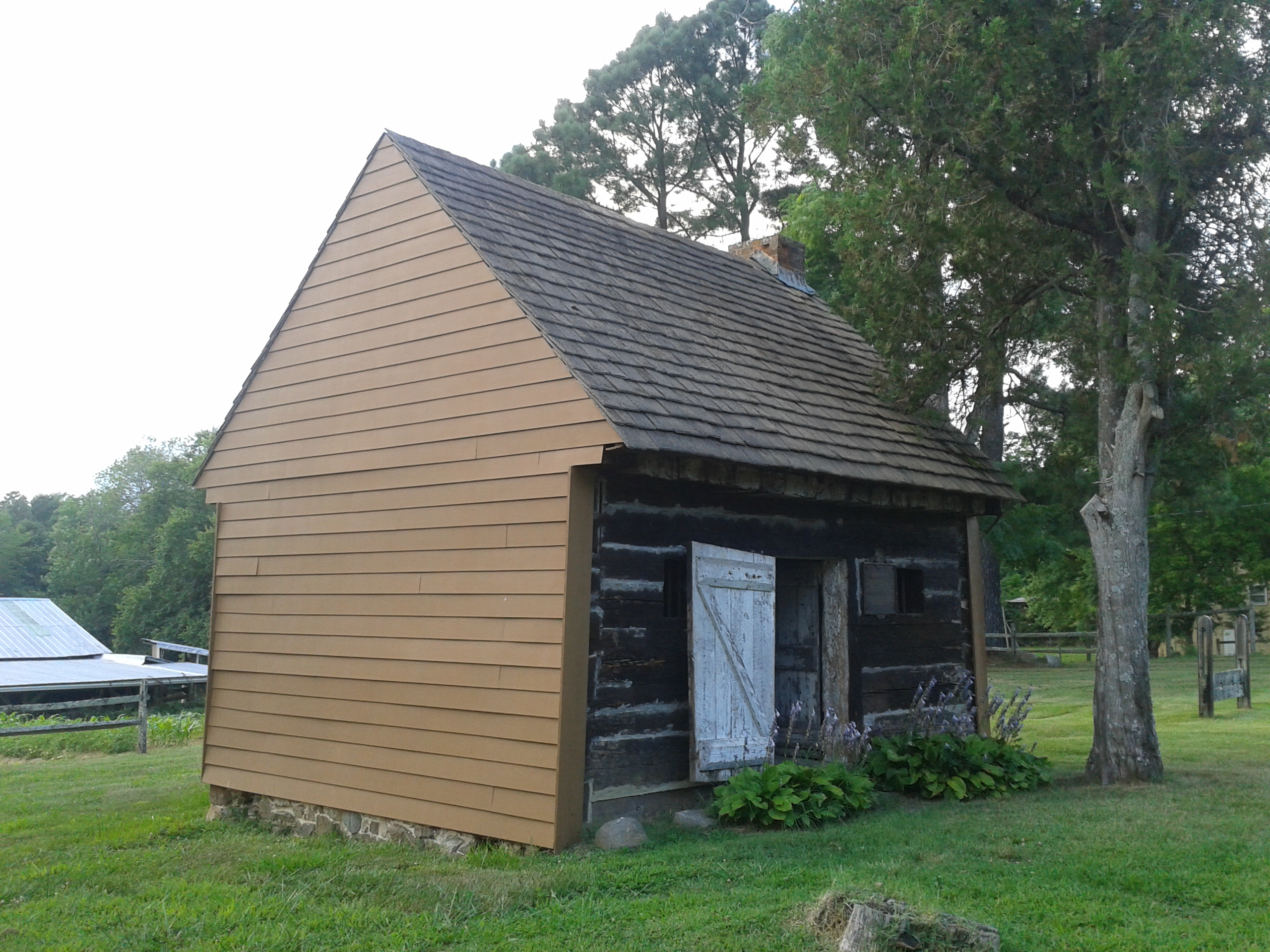
- Worsham Debtors' Prison in 2016

- Location within Virginia
- Location: Intersection of Rte. 15 and Rte. 665; Worsham, Virginia
- Coordinates: 37°13′49″N 78°26′35″W
- Built: 1787
- Architect: Richard Babb
- Architectural style: colonial
- NRHP reference No.: 72001412
- VHL No.: 073-0007

Significant dates
- Added to NRHP: September 22, 1972
- Designated VHL: August 15, 1972

The Debtors' Prison is a historic debtors' prison building located in Worsham, Virginia. Constructed in 1787, it is one of three such prisons, all listed on the National Register of Historic Places, remaining in Virginia; the other two are in Accomac and Tappahannock. Of the three, only the one in Worsham was constructed of wood. It is the oldest surviving public building in Prince Edward County, and dates to the time when Worsham was the county seat.

== History ==
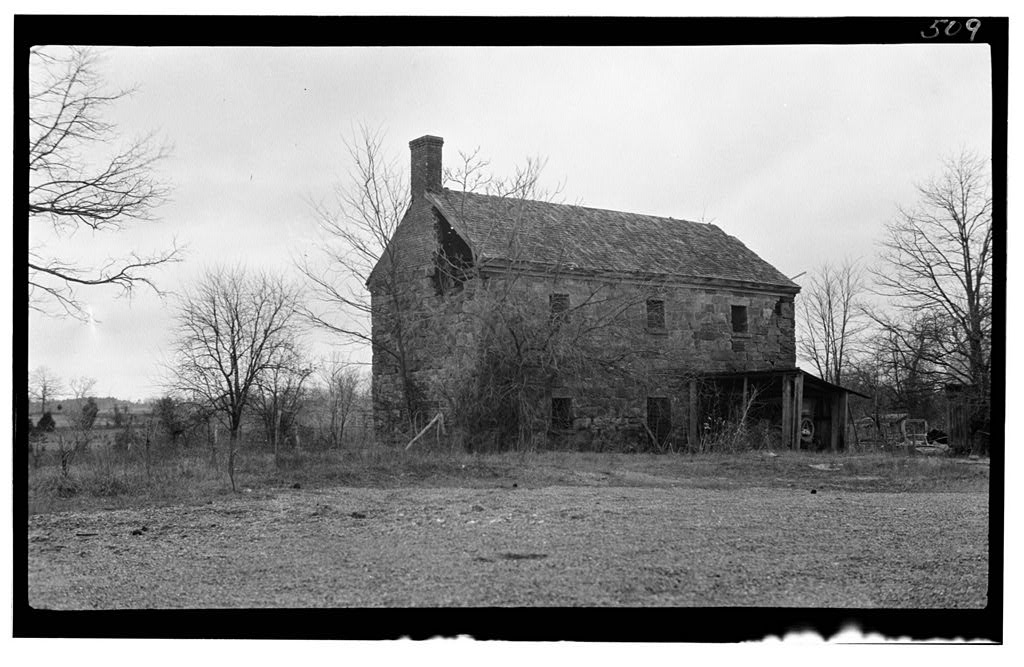
The debtors' prison prior to its restoration

Worsham served as the county seat of Prince Edward County between 1754 and 1872; the debtors' prison was built there in 1787 to provide delinquents with separate quarters from other prisoners. Construction of the "gaol [jail] for debtors" was actually authorized in 1786; two local men, Thomas Scott and Charles Allen, were directed to allow bids. One Richard Bibb appears to have been hired to build the prison, as he was paid fifty-two pounds for its construction once the completed structure was viewed and received.

Virginia abolished the imprisonment of debtors as a method of punishment in 1849; accordingly, at some point, possibly as early as 1820, the prison building was converted into a residence. Numerous alterations to the structure were carried out as part of the conversion, although many would be removed during 20th-century renovations.

Little is recorded about the history of the jail once it became a house, although it is known to have been owned for a time by a family called Burke. They deeded it to one E. L. Dupuy in 1908, and it remained with his family until being purchased by Preservation Virginia (formerly known as the Association for the Preservation of Virginia Antiquities) in 1950. They carried out renovations on the building in 1951.

After the Prince Edward Branch of Preservation Virginia dissolved in the 1970s, the building became property of Prince Edward County.

== Design ==
The Worsham Debtors' Prison is a small log structure measuring 14' by 18'; it has been described as having "the solid appearance of a building constructed with security in mind". It consists of a single room, with an unused attic area above. The logs used to build the walls are square-hewn and closely fitted, without chinking. These are held together with half-dovetailed joins at the corners. Similar, heavy logs, set closely together, were used in the construction of the floor and ceiling. Those in the ceiling extend about a foot past the front and back walls, thus forming a slight roof overhang. The roof is lighter, of frame construction. The foundation of the building is low and made of sandstone rubble; a chimney, made of brick, is located on the interior end.

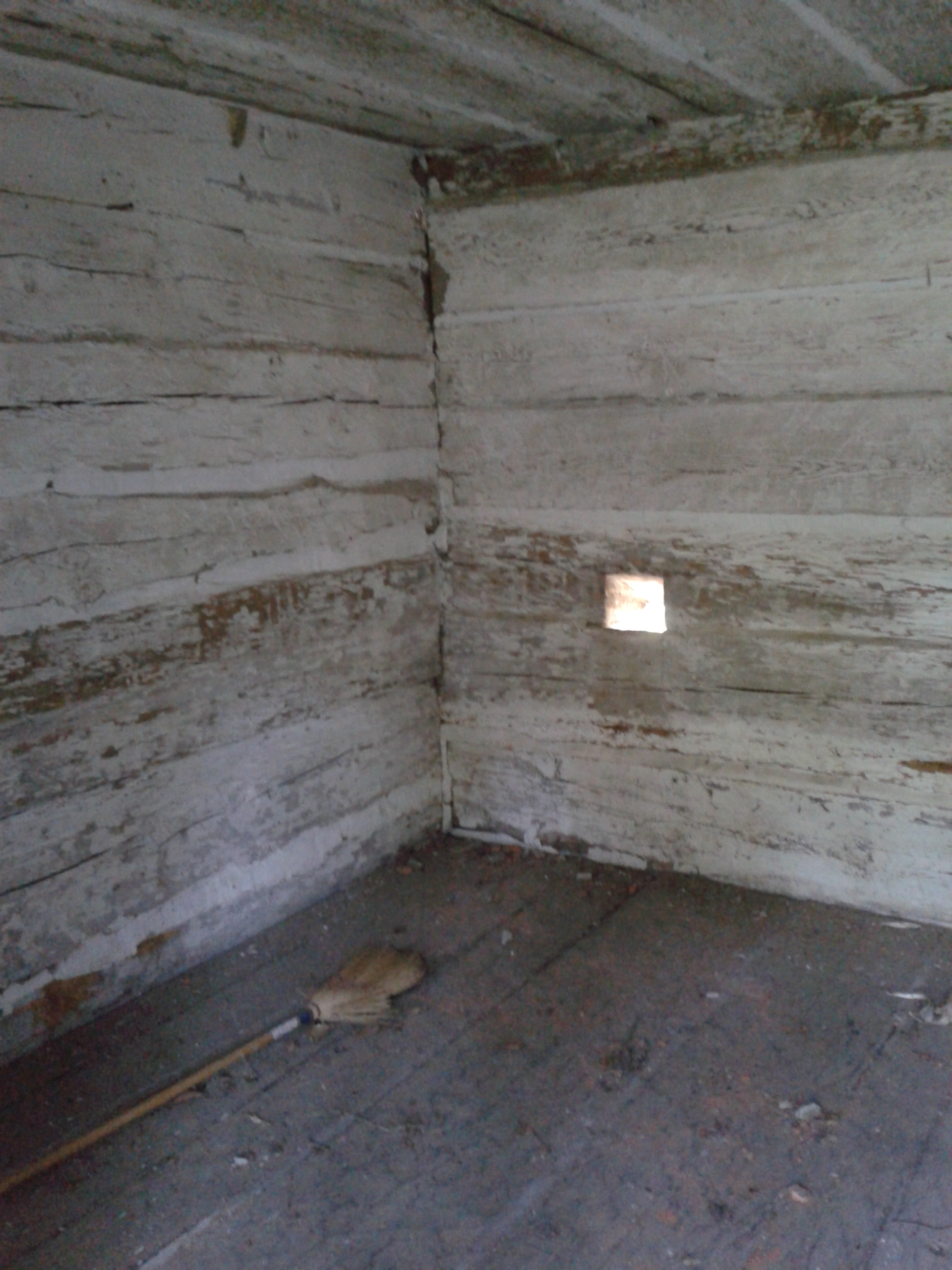
Interior of the restored structure

Entrance into the prison building is through a pair of doors located in the center of the front wall. The outer of the two might possibly be a replacement; the inner one, with vertical beaded boards and horizontal braces, appears to be a product of the eighteenth century. The door is flanked by two small square windows, both unglazed; the southern one is only a conjectural restoration, based on the surviving northern window. The remains of three vertical iron bars were found in this opening, and they have served as a pattern for some of the restoration work. There is a small opening in the back wall of the jail that appears to have been used as a latrine slot.

Several additions to the jail were constructed upon its conversion to a private residence. Among these was a lean-to appended to the back wall. In addition a larger window was cut for the front wall, and another opening was cut into the ceiling to provide entry into the attic. Most of these additions were removed during Preservation Virginia's restoration of the building in 1951. The roof, initially of tin, was replaced by wooden shingles. All of the beaded siding was removed save for that under the gables. The age of this siding is not known, although it is believed to have dated to before the American Civil War, and might have been of eighteenth-century vintage. Further restorations were scheduled to have been carried out by Preservation Virginia later in the 1970s.

A more substantial prison building, made of stone, was erected just north of the old debtors' prison sometime around 1855. This structure had fallen in by the mid-1950s, when the walls were dismantled. A heavy iron door and a window grate from the newer building were saved at its demolition, and have since been erected just outside the old jail.

== Significance ==
The Worsham Debtors' Prison is a rare relic of 18th-century Virginia, being one of the few log public buildings erected at that time to have survived to the present day; it is also the oldest remaining public building in Prince Edward County. The quality of the building's construction is also of note. The building is located across the road from the Old Prince Edward County Clerk's Office, another building remaining from when Worsham was the county seat.

== Bibliography ==
- Association for the Preservation of Virginia Antiquities, "Report on Archaeological Exploration in Conjunction with the Superstructure of the Old Debtors' Prison For Prince Edward Co. at Worsham, Virginia," Umpubl. ms., 1954. (Copy on file at VHLC)
- Prince Edward County Records, order book 8: 187 & 328.
