= Debtors' Prison (Accomac, Virginia) =

Historic former prison in Virginia, US

- U.S. National Register of Historic Places
- Virginia Landmarks Register
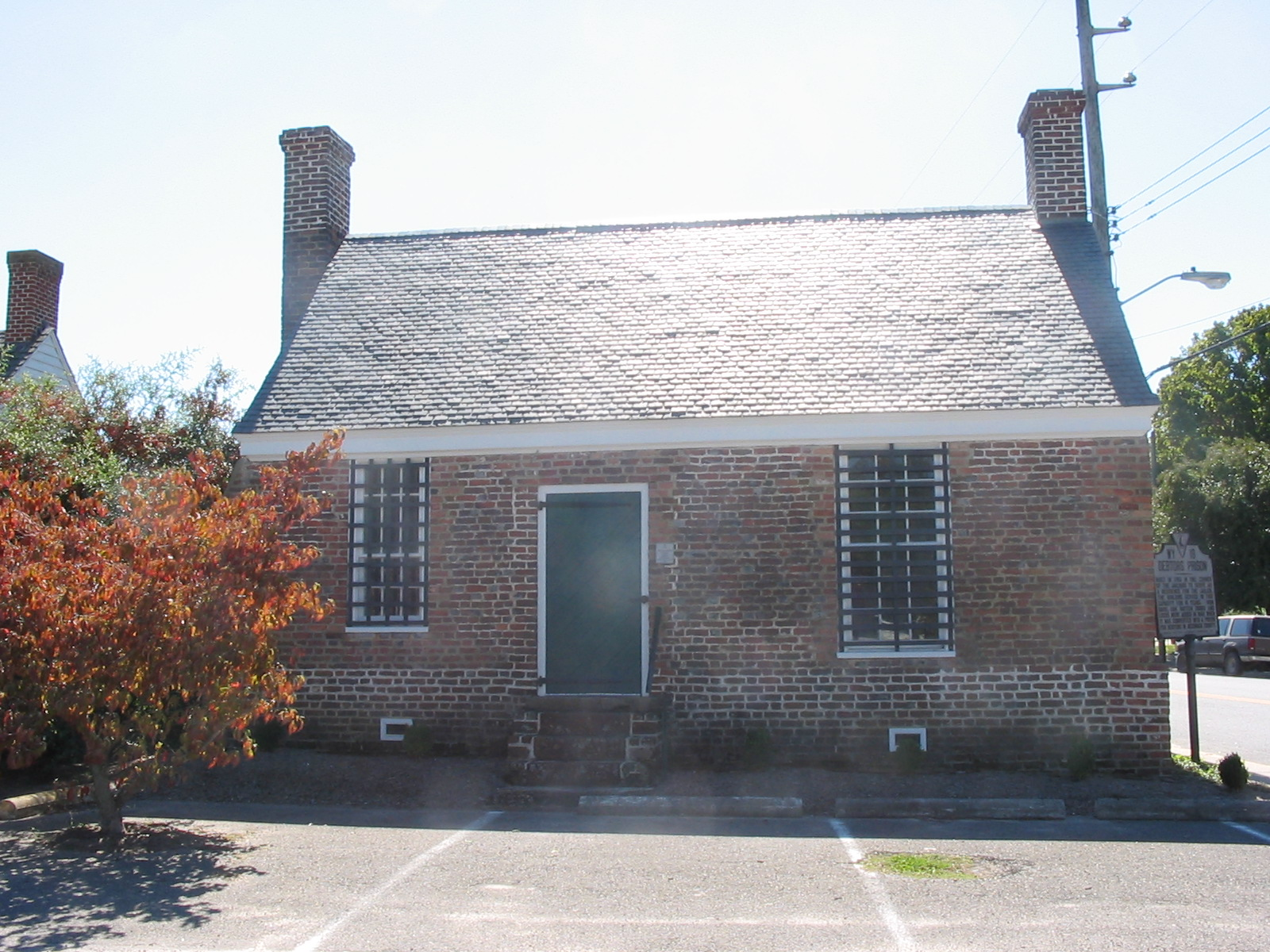
- Accomac Debtors' Prison

- Location within Virginia
- Location: State Rte. 764; Accomac, Virginia
- Coordinates: 37°43′13″N 75°40′15.7″W
- Built: 1783
- Architect: Selby Simpson
- Architectural style: colonial
- NRHP reference No.: 76002087
- VLR No.: 160-0009

Significant dates
- Added to NRHP: November 7, 1976
- Designated VLR: June 15, 1976

The Debtors' Prison is a historic debtors' prison in Accomac, Virginia. Constructed in 1783 as a house for the Accomack County jailer, it is the oldest public structure in the county. It was converted to use as a debtors' prison in 1824, which purpose it served until 1849. The prison was added to the Virginia Landmarks Register and the National Register of Historic Places in 1976; along with structures in Worsham and Tappahannock, both in Virginia as well, it is one of only three debtors' prisons in the country on the National Register.

== History ==
The structure that stands today in central Accomac, not far from the Accomack County Courthouse, is the last survivor of a complex which initially included both a jail and a jailyard. In 1775 the Accomack County court ordered a committee to "plan and lay off a Draught for a new prison for this County." Construction was completed on the building itself in 1782, in which year an inspection committee approved of it, but recommended "that a suitable wall made of Brick around the Gaol at a convenient distance is absolutely necessary and that there ought to be a small house built at the public expense in one corner and adjoining the said wall for the residence of the jailor, without which we are of opinion that the prisoners cannot be kept in perfect security." The county accepted these additions to the complex in 1784. In 1969 archaeological work was undertaken by the Virginia Historic Landmarks Commission in the vicinity of the debtors' prison. This revealed that the complex as completed in 1784 was seventy feet square and contained within a brick wall. The jail was in the northeast corner of the square; the surviving jailor's house formed part of the yard's south wall, and was located at the west corner. The contractor for the initial construction project was listed as one Selby Simpson.

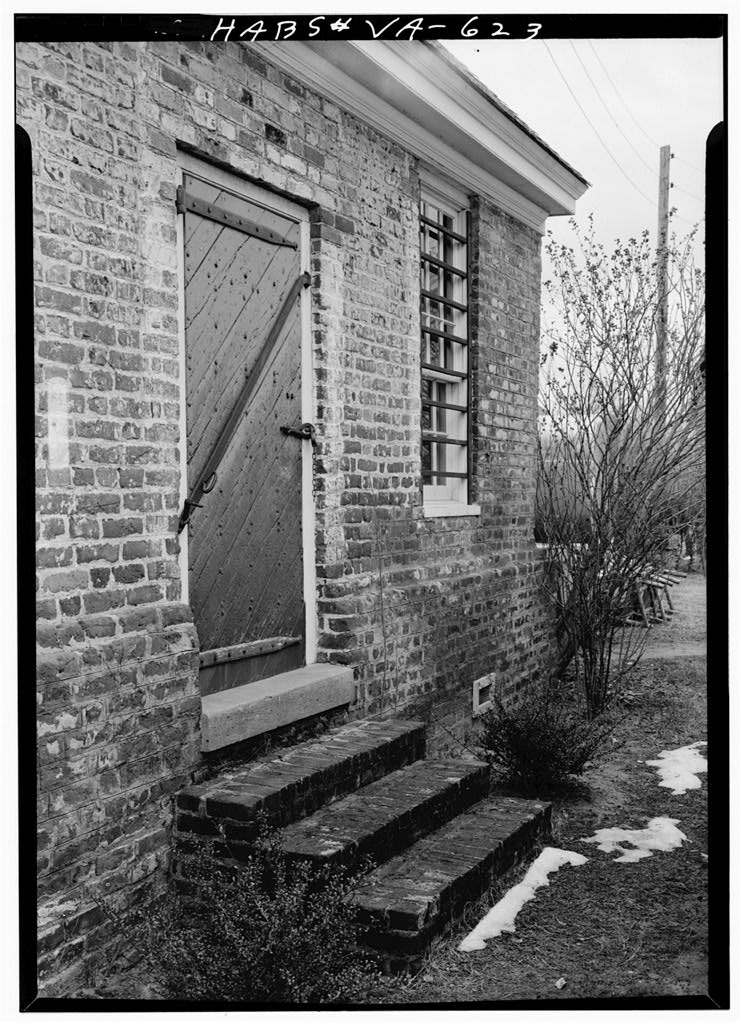
Closeup of the front of the prison building showing the latticed windows and heavy oak door

By the first decades of the nineteenth century the jailer's house was already sorely in need of repair, and consequently the county began to study the possibility of finding an alternative use for the property. At around the same time a state law had been passed requiring provision of separate facilities for debtors and felons. Thus, in 1824 a committee that was set up by the county court reminded that body that the law did not actually require the county to provide quarters for a jailer; furthermore, such an arrangement was highly unusual, if not unheard-of, in any other county in Virginia. Consequently, it was recommended that the house be reappropriated and reconfigured to serve as a debtors' prison, especially as it was thought that the proximity of the jailor's house to the jail posed a security risk. The committee held that little work needed to be done to convert the jail to its new purpose, saying "that iron bars to the windows of inch iron and oak Batton doors to be hung outside, is all that is necessary to be done to the said house, to answer the purposes intended, because it is believed that debtors have no inducement to brake [sic] prison, the Law authorizes them with little trouble to discharge themselves whenever they wish so to do." The conversion was finished quickly, and the house served in its new capacity until 1849, when imprisonment for debt was discontinued in Virginia. The old jail and wall were demolished by the county in 1909; the debtors' prison was turned over to the Drummondtown Branch of Preservation Virginia (formerly known as the Association for the Preservation of Virginia Antiquities). That organization undertook a partial renovation of the property in 1911, revisiting it for a fuller restoration in 1953. From 1911 until 1927 the building was used as a library; today it is a museum of local history, and is furnished to represent a typical middle class home of the eighteenth century. The Accomac debtors' prison was surveyed by the Historic American Buildings Survey between 1958 and 1961, when it was found to be in good condition; the formal report was placed on file in 1961. The building is open by appointment.

== Design ==
Physically, the debtors' prison is a small building, measuring 18' by 30'; it is one story in height, three bays in length, and constructed of Flemish bond brick with glazed headers. Originally, the house formed the southwest corner of a 70-foot-square jailyard, and a small portion of the yard's original brick wall can still be seen projecting from the northeast corner of the building. A scar left by another portion of the same wall still exists on the northwest corner of the façade. Both ends, and the south façade of the house, are fitted with a two-course stepped water table; none is employed on the front wall, which at one time faced onto the jailyard. At the east end of the house is an exterior end chimney, while the west end has an interior one. Today the window openings, which do not have shutters, are equipped with modern nine-over-nine sash, but they retain certain trappings of the building's conversion in 1824, including the iron lattice covering; also dating to the same time are the structure's heavy batten doors. Two windows, one at the east end and one on the south façade, were bricked up in the twentieth century. The same century saw the addition of a box cornice and slate roof to the house. Only one outbuilding, a small wooden shed, was documented on the property by HABS.

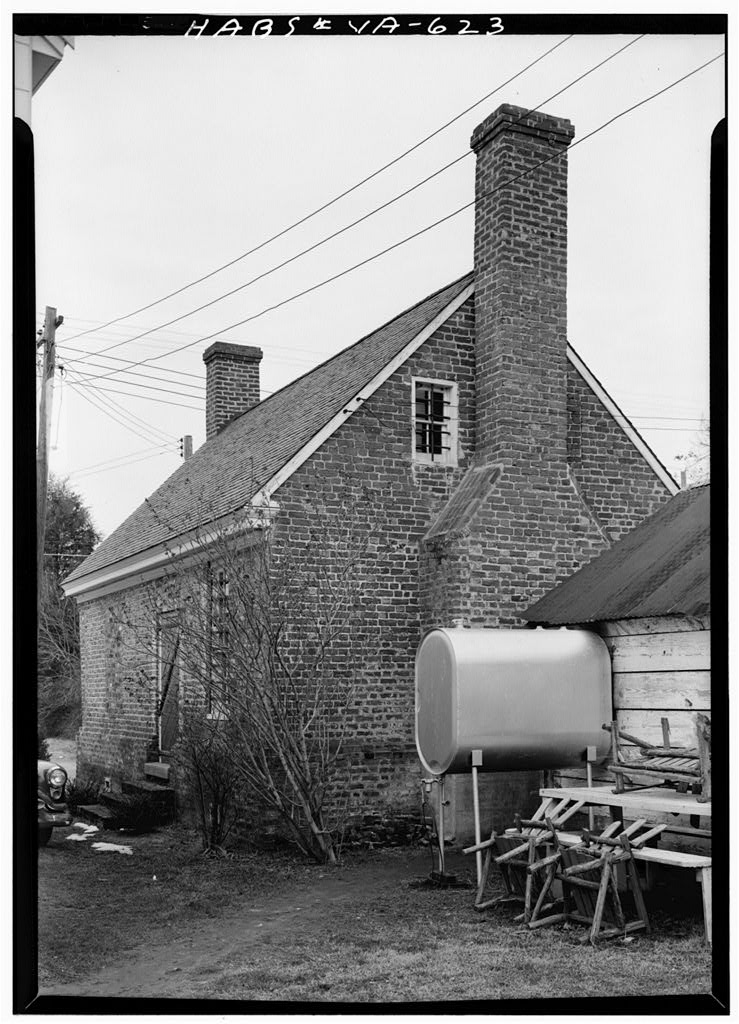
View of the back of the prison

The interior plan of the house is typical of a small hall-and-parlor dwelling of its era, containing two rooms on the main level and a further two in the attic. The east room is the larger of the two on the main floor; in its southeast corner is an enclosed staircase which rises to the garrett. The fireplace is treated with plain boards, which have been lapped in a way that is meant to recall a crossett surround; similar treatment of the chimneybreast can be found in the west room, which is otherwise unembellished. A framed partition separates the two rooms, and is covered on both sides with horizontal beaded sheathing. The whole interior is fitted with diagonal board doors. The HABS investigation found that some refitting and redesigning of the interior rooms had taken place, but that finding out what changes were involved would have required significant removal of interior fittings; in addition, there was much evidence of repair, but little of outright alteration.

== Significance ==
The Accomac debtors' prison is significant for a number of reasons; chief among them is that it is the oldest municipal building still standing in Accomack County. In addition, it is a rare survivor of its type, and well illustrates the typical eighteenth-century penal building once common in Virginia.

== Bibliography ==
- Heite, Edward E., "Excavation of the Accomack Jailyard Wall," Quarterly Bulletin of the Archaeological Society of Virginia, 26 (1972).
- Whitelaw, Ralph T., "Accomack County Debtors' Prison," 1946, ms. in possession of Drummondtown Branch of the Association for the Preservation of Virginia Antiquities
