= Williams v. Illinois =

- Supreme Court of the United States

Argued April 22, 1970 Decided June 29, 1970
- Full case name: Williams v. Illinois
- Citations: 399 U.S. 235 (more) 90 S. Ct. 2018; 26 L. Ed. 2d 586

Holding
- If a person cannot afford to pay a fine, it violates equal protection to convert that unpaid fines into jail time to extend a person's incarceration beyond a statutory maximum length.

Court membership
- Chief Justice Warren E. Burger Associate Justices Hugo Black · William O. Douglas; John M. Harlan II · William J. Brennan Jr. Potter Stewart · Byron White; Thurgood Marshall · Harry Blackmun

Case opinions
- Majority: Burger, joined by Black, Douglas, Brennan, Stewart, White, Marshall, Blackmun
- Concurrence: Harlan

Williams v. Illinois, 399 U.S. 235 (1970), was a United States Supreme Court case in which the Court held that, if a person cannot afford to pay a fine, it violates the Equal Protection Clause to convert that unpaid fine into jail time to extend a person's incarceration beyond a statutory maximum length.

== Background ==
On August 16, 1967, Willie E. Williams was convicted of petty theft of credit cards, checks, and papers worth under $150. Under Illinois law, Williams was sentenced to the maximum sentence for the crime: 1 year of imprisonment, a $500 fine, and $5 in court fees. Under §1-7(k) of the Illinois Criminal Code, if a person defaulted on their payment of fines and court costs after 1 year, the state could keep that person in jail under a "work-off" system at a rate of $5 per day to collect revenue that would've been produced by that person's fine payment. So in addition to his 1-year sentence, if Williams defaulted on his owed $505 in fines, Williams would be imprisoned for an additional 101 days beyond the maximum sentence for petty theft to "work off" his debt.

On November 29, 1967, Williams petitioned the judge to vacate the "work off" part of his sentence because although he was currently unable to pay, if he was released from jail at the 1-year mark, he would be able to get a job to pay off the $505. The trial court dismissed his petition. The Supreme Court of Illinois affirmed the trial court's decision, holding there was "no denial of equal protection...when an indigent defendant is imprisoned to satisfy payment of the fine."

== Decision ==
The Court held that although a state has latitude in determining punishments for state crimes, that Illinois had violated the Equal Protection Clause by subjecting a particular class of convicted defendants to imprisonment beyond the maximum allowed by statute just because of their poverty.

A companion case, Morris v. Schoonfield, was "remanded for reconsideration in light of intervening Maryland legislation and decision in Williams".

== See also ==
- Bearden v. Georgia, 461 U.S. 660 (1983)
- Tate v. Short, 401 U.S. 395 (1971)
