= Tate v. Short =

- Supreme Court of the United States

Argued January 14, 1971 Decided March 2, 1971
- Full case name: Tate v. Short
- Citations: 401 U.S. 395 (more) 91 S. Ct. 668; 28 L. Ed. 2d 130

Holding
- It is a violation of equal protection to convert a fine to jail time simply because the sentenced person cannot pay the fine.

Court membership
- Chief Justice Warren E. Burger Associate Justices Hugo Black · William O. Douglas; John M. Harlan II · William J. Brennan Jr. Potter Stewart · Byron White; Thurgood Marshall · Harry Blackmun

Case opinions
- Majority: Brennan, joined by unanimous
- Concurrence: Blackmun
- Concurrence: Black
- Concurrence: Harlan

Tate v. Short, 401 U.S. 395 (1971), was a United States Supreme Court case in which the Court held it is a violation of equal protection to convert a fine to jail time simply because the sentenced person cannot pay the fine.

== See also ==
- Bearden v. Georgia
- Williams v. Illinois
