= Fuller v. Oregon =

- Supreme Court of the United States

Argued March 26, 1974 Decided May 20, 1974
- Full case name: Prince Eric Fuller v. State of Oregon
- Citations: 417 U.S. 40 (more) 94 S.Ct. 2116; 40 L. Ed. 2d 642; 1974 U.S. LEXIS 55

Holding
- (1) The Oregon recoupment scheme does not violate the Equal Protection Clause of the Fourteenth Amendment. (2) The Oregon law does not infringe upon a defendant's right to counsel, since the knowledge that he may ultimately have to repay the costs of legal services does not affect his ability to obtain such services. The challenged statute is thus not similar to a provision that "chill[s] the assertion of constitutional rights by penalizing those who choose to exercise them."

Court membership
- Chief Justice Warren E. Burger Associate Justices William O. Douglas · William J. Brennan Jr. Potter Stewart · Byron White; Thurgood Marshall · Harry Blackmun; Lewis F. Powell Jr. · William Rehnquist

Case opinions
- Majority: Stewart, joined by Burger, White, Blackmun, Powell, Rehnquist
- Concurrence: Douglas
- Dissent: Marshall, joined by Brennan

Laws applied
- U.S. Const. amend. VI; U.S. Const. amend. XIV; Ore.Rev.Stat. § 161.665-161.685

Fuller v. Oregon, 417 U.S. 40 (1974), was a United States Supreme Court case in which the Court held that Oregon's statute allowing for the recoupment of costs related to court-appointed defense counsel did not violate either the Fourteenth Amendment's Equal Protection Clause or the Sixth Amendment's Assistance of Counsel Clause. The statute required convicted defendants who were indigent at the time of their trial, but later acquired financial means, to repay the costs of their court-appointed lawyer and investigator.
